= Tigrayan peace process =

Process of ending the Tigray War

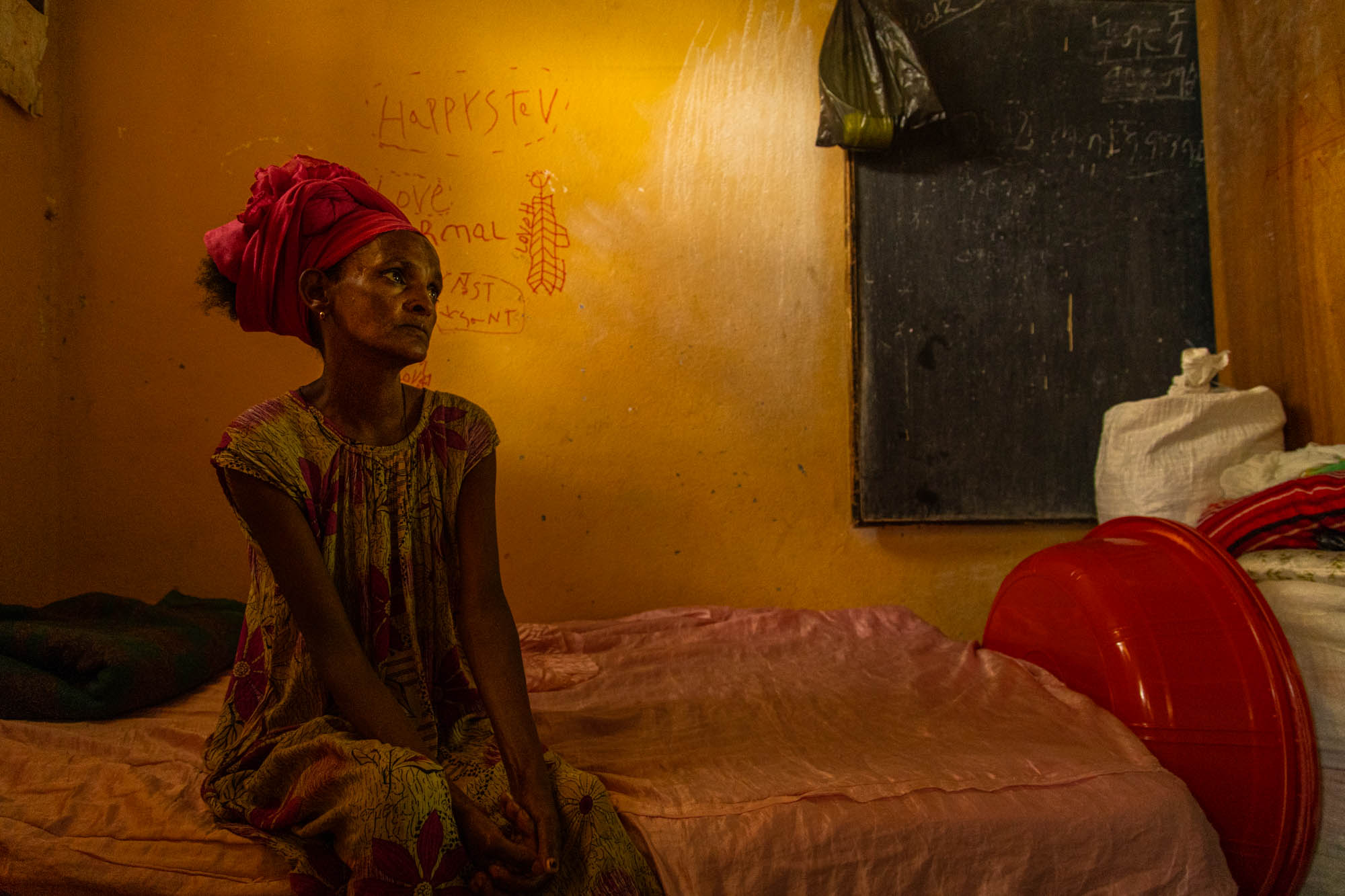
A woman sits on her bed in a classroom-turned-IDP camp in central Mekelle, the capital of the Tigray region, 4 June 2021.

The Tigrayan peace process encompasses the series of proposals, meetings, agreements and actions that aimed to resolve the Tigray War.

A number of proposals for peace negotiations and mediation were made involving some of the main groups involved in the war, with some being made as early as November 2020. Among other, this includes: an emergency Intergovernmental Authority on Development summit in December 2020; a joint statement by the National Congress of Great Tigray, the Tigray Independence Party, and Salsay Weyane Tigray describing their eight pre-conditions for peace in February 2021; a mediation group called "A3+1", (consisting of three African countries, Kenya, Niger and Tunisia, and one non-African country, Saint Vincent and the Grenadines) in July–August 2021; and a March–August 2022 ceasefire wherein Ethiopian and Tigrayan officials attempted to negotiate a peaceful end to the conflict.

On 2 November 2022, the Ethiopian government and Tigrayan leaders signed a peace accord in Pretoria, South Africa, with the African Union as a mediator, and agreed on "orderly, smooth and coordinated disarmament". The agreement was made effective the next day on 3 November, marking the second anniversary of the war; on 12 November, another agreement was signed in Nairobi, Kenya to both reaffirm and implement the Pretoria deal.

== Background ==
A conflict between the goals of centralised versus federalised political power between the federal Ethiopian government headed by prime minister Abiy Ahmed and the former dominating party of Ethiopia, the Tigray People's Liberation Front (TPLF), that retained power in the Tigray Region, emerged in 2019 and 2020. The TPLF dug trenches in a village in June in preparation for a possible war. Abiy, Eritrean president Isaias Afwerki and Somali president Mohamed Abdullahi Mohamed (Farmaajo) held a Tripartite Agreement meeting in Asmara on 27 January 2020, Abiy visited an Eritrean military base in July 2020, and Isaias visited the Harar Meda Airport Ethiopian air base in Bishoftu in October 2020. Ethiopian National Defense Force (ENDF) and Amhara Region special forces deployed on the south border of Tigray Region in mid-October 2020 and ENDF troops were flown to Eritrea to prepare a joint attack on the TPLF by the ENDF and the Eritrean Defence Forces (EDF). On the night of 3–4 November 2020, the federal military Northern Command bases in the Tigray Region were attacked by the TPLF, and the ENDF responded militarily.

The war continued into February 2021, including military operations, war crimes, sexual violence and looting, with casualty estimates in February of 52,000 civilians and 100,000 soldiers killed. On 6 February, the United Nations Special Adviser on the Prevention of Genocide, Alice Wairimu Nderitu, stated that the "risk of atrocity crimes" would remain high and risked worsening unless "urgent measures [were] immediately taken".

== 2020 ==
=== African Union (November 2020) ===
Around 9 November 2020, the TPLF leader and elected head of the Tigray Region, Debretsion Gebremichael, requested the African Union to intervene to stop the war, requesting peace negotiations. Debretsion described Abiy's government as illegitimate.

Abiy argued that the TPLF's holding of the 2020 election was illegal and that the TPLF had started preparing for war since 2018, organising and drafting militias. He stated that Ethiopia would manage the situation on its own. Moussa Faki, chairperson of the African Union Commission, "urged" the Ethiopian and Tigrayan governments to negotiate. On 10 November, Abiy refused the proposed dialogue.

On 20 November, Ethiopian president Sahle-Work Zewde visited South Africa as an envoy of Abiy to discuss the war with Cyril Ramaphosa, president of South Africa and chair of the African Union. As a result of the visit, Ramaphosa appointed three former presidents, Joaquim Chissano of Mozambique, Ellen Johnson-Sirleaf of Liberia and Kgalema Motlanthe of South Africa as Special Envoys to "mediate between the parties in the conflict", to "engage with all sides to the conflict", with the aim of obtaining a ceasefire and "creating conditions for an inclusive national dialogue to resolve all issues that led to the conflict". The mediation proposal was motivated by the spirit of "African solutions for African problems." Abiy immediately described the news of planned mediation by the envoys between the federal government and the former Tigray government as "fake". The three envoys visited Ethiopia during 25–27 November and talked with Abiy and representatives of the Transitional Government of Tigray that aimed to replace the TPLF government of Tigray. Ramaphosa published a summary of Abiy's views on the war and Abiy's "commitment to dialogue" in the official summary of the envoys' visit.

=== Intergovernmental Authority on Development (December 2020) ===
On 13 December, Sudanese prime minister Abdalla Hamdok stated that he had agreed with Abiy to hold an emergency meeting of the Intergovernmental Authority on Development grouping together seven East African countries. Hamdok arrived in Addis Ababa the same day, as the first foreign leader to visit the city since the Tigray War started. The IGAD summit was held on 20 December in Djibouti, with an official statement "reaffirm[ing] the primacy of constitutional order, stability and unity of the Federal Democratic Republic of Ethiopia" and "welcom[ing]" a 29 November agreement on "'unimpeded, sustained and secure access' for humanitarian support." Abiy "expressed [his] deepest gratitude" to the IGAD leaders at the meeting for supporting the federal government.

== 2021 ==
=== Tigrayan peace conditions (February 2021) ===
On 19 February, the National Congress of Great Tigray (Baytona), Tigray Independence Party (TIP) and Salsay Weyane Tigray (SAWET) published eight demands to the international community that closely overlapped with the TPLF's pre-conditions. The pre-conditions and demands were:

1. the EDF should leave Tigray Region (Baytona/TIP/SAWET) and an independent international body would have to confirm the departure (TPLF);
2. Tigray would have to be "secured" and the "enemies" partitioning Tigray (TPLF), or Amhara militia and the ENDF (Baytona/TIP/SAWET), would have to leave Tigray Region (TPLF);
3. the Transitional Government would have to be replaced by the elected administration returning (TPLF);
4. an international investigative body would have to be created for investigating the war crimes and become functional (TPLF+Baytona/TIP/SAWET);
5. full unrestrained access to Tigray would have to be given to journalists and international humanitarian agencies (TPLF+Baytona/TIP/SAWET);
6. an international investigative body would have to investigate the looting and destruction of the war (TPLF);
7. Tigrayans arrested as a result of the war would have to be unconditionally released (TPLF);
8. the peace negotiations would have to be mediated by an independent international body (TPLF+Baytona/TIP/SAWET).

Seb Hidri made similar demands on 21 February 2021, with the additional demands for a United Nations human rights monitoring and peacekeeping force present while reconstructing a local government; and for a UNESCO-led investigation of the destruction of cultural heritage in Tigray Region.

=== March 2021 ===
On 8 March 2021, Sahle-Work Zewde visited Kenya for discussions with Kenyan president Uhuru Kenyatta. Daily Nation speculated that the purpose of the visit was a followup to United States Secretary of State Antony Blinken's pressure on Kenya to mediate in the Tigray War.

On 11 March, the US ambassador to Ethiopia, Geeta Pasi, announced support for joint humanitarian activities by international partners and the Government of Ethiopia. In late March, Abiy refused a ceasefire proposal recommended by US Senator Chris Coons on behalf of US president Joe Biden. Coons, who had five hours of talks with Abiy, stated that he had "pressed for a unilateral declaration of a cease-fire, something the prime minister did not agree to, and pressed for a rapid move towards a full political dialogue on Tigray's future political structure."

=== July 2021 ===
In Operation Alula in late June 2021, the Tigray Defence Forces forced the ENDF to leave the Tigrayan capital Mekelle and much of the Tigray Region and the federal government announced a unilateral ceasefire. In the words of peace researcher Alex de Waal, the federal forces held Tigray Region under a "starvation siege". On 4 July, the restored Tigrayan government set seven pre-conditions for a ceasefire:

1. withdrawal of the EDF and Amhara militias;
2. investigations of war crimes;
3. humanitarian access;
4. restoral of services;
5. constitutional rights of the Tigrayan government;
6. suspension of federal-level decisions taken since October 2020;
7. an international monitoring mechanism for the other six points.

De Waal judged the conditions reasonable, but argued that both the federal and Tigrayan governments used provocative language that he described as "macho posturing", symbolising that "the two sides hate each other so much they would rather pull the house down than reconcile."

In late July, a group of anonymous "Concerned Ethiopians" issued a public appeal, published by the World Peace Foundation, for a mediated negotiation between the federal, Tigrayan and Amhara governments, to start with confidence-building measures including the "[de-escalation] of rhetoric" and cessation of hate speech, mutual uncondition recognition, a one-month ceasefire, statements of each government's demands, and withdrawal of the EDF from all of Ethiopia. The Concerned Ethiopians proposed detailed mediation steps, transitional justice and called for a transitional process to find long-term solutions to Ethiopian "political problems deeply structural in their nature".

=== August 2021 ===
In early August, Sudanese prime minister Abdalla Hamdok, in his role as head of IGAD, proposed to mediate between the Ethiopian government and Tigrayan leaders. Hamdok contacted both sides with the aim of starting negotiations and allowing humanitarian aid to enter Tigray. However, the Ethiopian government rejected the proposal. Billene Seyoum, Abiy Ahmed's spokesperson, referred to the ongoing border dispute between the two countries over al-Fashaga, Sudan, and stated that Sudan was not a "credible party" to mediate.

Researchers Corda Tiziana and Ann Fitz-Gerald said that a unified international stance and mediators who are considered neutral would be needed for mediation to be accepted. Peace researcher Kjetil Tronvoll suggested that Sudan together with another party might be together acceptable as mediators. Turkish president Recep Tayyip Erdoğan also offered to be a mediator.

On 26 August, Souleymane Bachir Diagne, Mamadou Diouf and 56 other African intellectuals issued an open letter calling for a mediated solution to the conflict, stating, "All Ethiopians must recognise that a political rather than military solution is what is now called for, regardless of the claims and counterclaims, legitimate and otherwise, as to how Ethiopia has come to this place." The group called for IGAD and the AU to implement their mandated roles of providing mediation in the conflict, and for the wider international community to support IGAD and AU mediation actions. The group called for "any negotiated political settlement to include a process of public accountability for mass atrocities committed across Ethiopia."

=== A3+1 (July–August 2021) ===
In July and August, a mediation group called "A3+1" (or A3 plus one), consisting of three African countries, Kenya, Niger and Tunisia, and one non-African country, Saint Vincent and the Grenadines, was formed, in the spirit of "African solutions to African challenges". The Kenyan representative proposed an overall strategy of "Ethiopian solutions starting in the order of ceasefire, humanitarian delivery, dialogue, reconciliation and responsibility". On 26 August, Kenyan Ambassador to the United Nations Martin Kimani presented a statement to the United Nations Security Council on A3+1's vision of the conflict and how to mediate a solution. Kimani described causes of the conflict to include "conflicting views of [Ethiopia's] future" and inadequacy of Ethiopian "conflict prevention and resolution tools". He expressed concern about the "growing perception of ethnic identity being the basis of conflict" and unwillingness of each side to accept the others concerns as legitimate. Kimani also called for the Ethiopian parliament to remove the TPLF's terrorist status in order to allow direct negotiations between the TPLF and the federal Ethiopian government.

=== Calls by Ethiopian civil society (September 2021) ===
On 10 September 2021, a collective of 24 Ethiopian civil society organizations called for peace in Ethiopia:

#The root causes that gave rise to the conflict initially will not be sustainably resolved through war and violence. Even when one believes otherwise, doing so will cost the general public a lot.
1. The situation of unarmed civilians is so imminent that it cannot wait. The conflict has principally affected vulnerable groups of society such as women, and girls, children, and the elderly. — 24 local civil society organizations, Call for Peace,

The call was issued by the Association of Human Rights in Ethiopia (AHRE), Center for Advancement of Rights and Democracy (CARD), East African Initiative for Change (I4C), Lawyers for Human Rights, Setaweet Movement, Editors Guild of Ethiopia, Association of Human Rights in Ethiopia, Initiative Africa, Family Service Association, International Revival Movement, Center for National & Regional Integration Studies (CeNRIS), Ethiopian Women Lawyers Association (EWLA), Ethiopian Human Rights Defenders Center, TIMRAN, Center for Justice, Center of Concern, Good Governance for Africa – Eastern Africa, Network of Ethiopian Women's Associations (NEWA), Interafrica Group, Gate for Opportunity, New Millennium, Inclusive Vision for Democratic Ethiopia, Ethiopian Initiative for Human Rights, Ethiopian Media Women's Association.

=== November 2021 ===
On 8 November, Olusegun Obasanjo, former president of Nigeria and the African Union's newly appointed Horn of Africa envoy, stated to the AU Peace and Security Council that he had met separately with both Abiy Ahmed and Debretsion Gebremichael. Obasanjo stated that both agreed that "the differences opposing them are political and require political solution through dialogue."

On 25 November, the Oromo Federalist Congress (OFC) called for an inclusive transitional government to be created. The OFC's proposal included an immediate ceasefire, the release of all political prisoners, and "a total repudiation of all incitements to violence and hate speech in all forms". The OFC called for the immediate creation of a 3–6 month interim government headed by a mutually accepted person, and the main goal of the interim government being to create an "all-inclusive transitional government that shall last for 18 months", followed by "free, fair and credible elections".

=== December 2021 ===
On 20 December 2021, the TPLF announced they had withdrawn their troops from Amhara and Afar, saying they were hoping to create, as stated by Debretsion, "a decisive opening for peace." He also requested the establishment of a no-fly zone over Tigray, as well as a weapons embargo against Ethiopia and Eritrea. Following these developments, the ENDF stated that it would not advance any deeper into the Tigray region, though fighting still continued.

== 2022 ==
=== January 2022 ===
On 7 January, Ethiopia released a number of opposition leaders from prison, including some from the TPLF, and said they desired to have a dialogue with the Tigrayan leadership.

On 10 January, U.S. President Joe Biden spoke with Abiy, urging him for a peace deal. However, at least 19 civilians were killed in an airstrike in Tigray the same day. The Ethiopian leader continued to increase the use of deadly armed drones supplied by the UAE, Turkey and Iran. On 26 January, the Ethiopian council of ministers also proposed to end the state of emergency.

=== Ceasefire period (March–August 2022) ===
==== March ====
Reportedly, on 10 March, U.S. officials arranged for a secret meeting to occur in the Seychelles between Tigray's Tsadkan Gebretensae and Ethiopia's Birhanu Jula, in order for the two to negotiate a possible truce. Two weeks later, on 24 March, the Ethiopian government publicly declared an indefinite humanitarian truce, in order to allow the delivery of humanitarian aid into Tigray. This would mark the beginning of a ceasefire period that would last for 5 months, ending on 24 August.

==== April ====
On 25 April, the TPLF told Reuters that they have completely withdrawn their troops from the Afar region – which they first pledged to do in December 2021 – in the hopes of humanitarian aid entering the Tigray Region.

==== May ====
On 2 May, Debretsion released an open letter on Twitter to the UN, African Union Chairperson Macky Sall and Kenyan President Uhuru Kenyatta, warning of the "looming danger" of a possible future military operation by Eritrea. He further stated that Eritrea was intent on worsening the humanitarian situation and "crush[ing]" Tigray. Eritrea, in turn, released its own statement on 17 May, claiming that Tigray was being supported by "Western forces," and was preparing to launch more attacks; they also alleged that the TPLF had "a plan to obscure the rays of peace and cooperation that emerged in 2018 […] and return the whole region back to the turmoil, instability, and civil conflict they inflict."

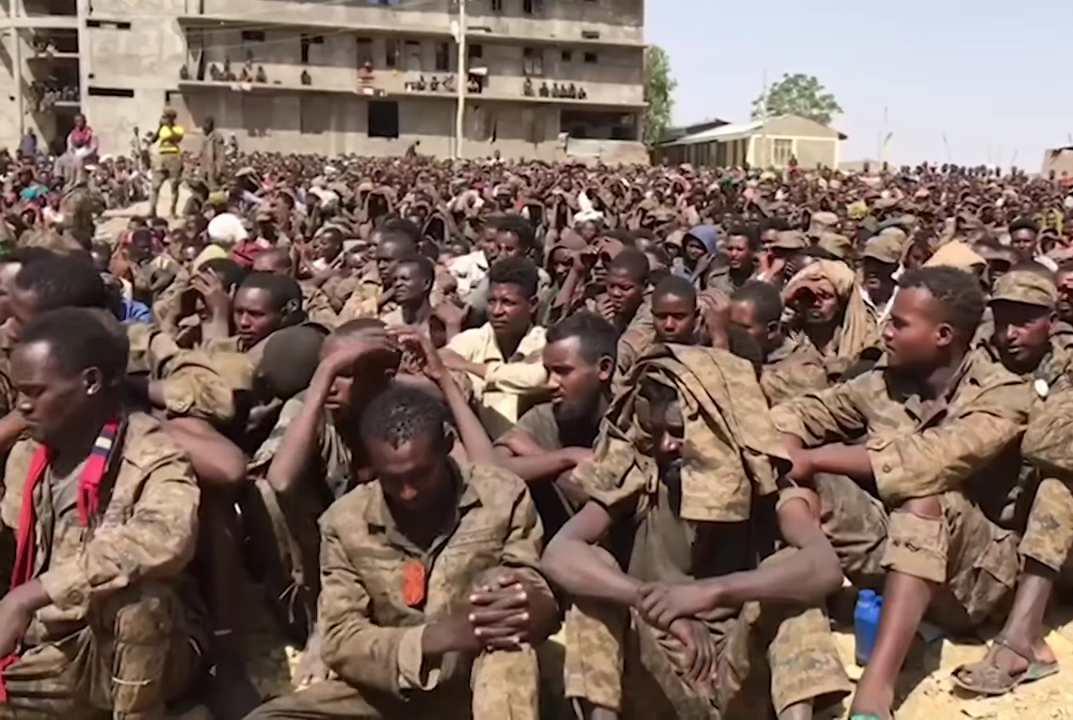
4,000 prisoners of war held by Tigray forces on 19 May 2022.

On 19–20 May, the TPLF stated it would release 4,028 government-allied POWs. Senior analyst for the International Crisis Group William Davison, in a statement made to the Associated Press, said that decision to release the prisoners may have been "both a sign of goodwill and also of the acute food shortage in Tigray," and endorsed the idea of restoring services to the region in order to ensure peace.

==== June ====
On the first week of June, the TPLF stated that, in order to reach an acceptable peace, they should be allowed to regain control of the Western Zone, saying it was "non-negotiable," and requested a "complete and verified withdrawal of all invading forces from every square inch of Tigrayan territory." The Western Zone is officially part of Tigray, but had been occupied by Amhara regional forces since the war began; the area was already a subject of intense dispute between Tigray and Amhara in the decades preceding the war, further compounding the issue.

On 14 June, Prime Minister Abiy (reportedly, for the first time) spoke publicly about potential peace with the TPLF, and stated that a committee had been established to see how likely this would be. He dismissed rumors about Ethiopia secretly negotiating with the TPLF, saying "secret negotiations have no substance." That same month, the U.S. had arranged another secret meeting between the two sides, this time in Djibouti (though whether this occurred before or after Abiy's comment was made is currently unclear).

==== July ====
Throughout July, tensions, disagreements and conflicting messages over how to conduct negotiations began to emerge. On 13 July, the Ethiopian peace committee had its first meeting; the day after, Ethiopia claimed that the TPLF was refusing to take steps towards peace. On 28 July, Ethiopian security advisor Redwan Hussein said that they were ready to have a dialogue with Tigrayan forces "anytime, anywhere." However, TPLF chairman Debretsion responded to this by stating that, "if the federal government was really ready to make peace, it would have resumed basic public services in the [Tigray] region."

A persistent issue throughout the ceasefire period was disagreement over who would mediate the peace talks. The Ethiopian government favoured the AU's Horn of Africa envoy Olusegun Obasanjo; the Tigrayan leadership, on the other hand, wanted Kenyan President Uhuru Kenyatta to lead mediation efforts instead. This was, in large part, due to the TPLF's perception that Obasanjo was too friendly with the Ethiopian government, and therefore claimed that Kenyatta would be more neutral.

==== August ====
In early August, the AU Peace and Security Council posted a statement saying it "commends the AU High Representative for the direct engagements between the Government of the Federal Democratic Republic of Ethiopia and the Tigray People's Liberation Front (TPLF)." This original statement, however, was soon retracted, replaced with an edited statement changing the word "between" to "with." The TPLF criticized this, alleging they did not have direct engagements with the Ethiopian government, calling it a "pure fabrication."

On 17 August, Ethiopia said it had completed a peace proposal to end the war, and that it would send it to the African Union to review. Ultimately, the TPLF rejected the announcement of this plan, describing it as an "obfuscation," and claimed it illustrated that Ethiopia was not truly interested in a dialogue for peace. By this point, while international aid had been allowed into the region since March, the issue of access to essential services in Tigray – which the TPLF had stated was a prerequisite to negotiations – still remained unresolved. In addition, TPLF spokesperson Getachew Reda alleged on Twitter that Ethiopian government forces were "taking provocative actions" and "flaunting their belligerent behavior in public."

Billene Seyoum, Foreign Press Secretary for the Ethiopian Prime Minister, stated on 18 August that the Ethiopian government was attempting to work towards peace, but also said that the TPLF should "sit for talks instead of looking for excuses to avoid peace." She dismissed the repeated calls to restore services to Tigray, saying it was a separate issue from the ceasefire talks, and would require a more stable environment for it to come into effect. Ultimately, little progress had been made, and war would resume six days later.

=== September 2022 ===
On 7 September – two weeks after the ceasefire collapsed – Debretsion sent a letter to UN Secretary-General António Guterres, issuing a request for peace, on the condition that humanitarian access be restored, that Eritrean troops completely withdraw from the region, and that the area would remain under international supervision.

The U.S. then organized a third meeting (led by U.S. Horn of Africa envoy Mike Hammer) to negotiate for peace on 9 September; the next day, AU Commission Chairperson Moussa Faki – who stated he was a part of these talks – extended Obasanjo's mandate as an envoy. The day after that, on Ethiopian New Year, the Tigrayan government said they were in favour of having peace talks with the African Union as a mediator; this marked a shift in approach from the TPLF, who had, until this point, been strictly opposed to having the AU act as a mediator.

=== South Africa peace talks (October–November 2022) ===
On 5 October, both the Ethiopian government and Tigrayan rebel forces accepted an invitation by the AU to have peace talks in South Africa, initially scheduled to take place between 7–8 October. However, talks were soon postponed, reportedly due to a combination of poor planning, logistical issues, the rapid escalation of fighting, and concerns from the TPLF about having more information available on how the talks would be conducted. António Guterres expressed his alarm on 17 October that "the situation in Ethiopia [was] spiraling out of control" and that Ethiopian society was "being ripped apart"; he insisted that peace talks be arranged as soon as possible.

New agreed-upon talks were rescheduled to start on 25 October, with Abiy stating in advance that the war "will end and peace will prevail." The talks were jointly mediated by Olusegun Obasanjo, Uhuru Kenyatta, Mike Hammer, and former Deputy-President of South Africa Phumzile Mlambo-Ngcuka. TPLF rebel leader Tsadkan Gebretensae and spokesperson Getachew Reda attended the talks, as did Ethiopian national security advisor Redwan Hussein. Hopes that these talks could definitively stop the war, however, remained low, as fighting did not appear to slow down, even as peace discussions were taking place; in particular, forces from Eritrea (who was not a party of the South Africa talks) reportedly engaged in the killing of civilians between 23 and 29 October.

On 28 October, Ethiopia vocalized their distrust about the motives of unspecified "various western entities" during the process, alleging that "unsubstantiated and politically motivated" claims were being made about the war for a "sinister" agenda, that "irresponsible propaganda" from the TPLF was being repeated uncritically, and further stated that "venerable organizations and well-meaning actors could be unwitting participants in this campaign." Still, despite these concerns, negotiations continued.

== Ethiopia–TPLF peace agreement (November 2022) ==
On 2 November 2022, after 10 days of discussions, Ethiopia and the TPLF signed a peace agreement, stipulating a "permanent cessation of hostilities." Both parties expressed a cautious, but optimistic, view of the agreement, with both promising to have it properly implemented. Eritrea and Amhara Region, both participants in the war, were not involved in the agreement.

=== Nairobi talks ===
On 7 November, Ethiopian and Tigrayan officials met for a new set of talks in Nairobi, Kenya, in order to discuss restoring humanitarian access to Tigray. As stipulated in the peace agreement, a line of communications between the two was established; the goal of this was (as stated by an anonymous official) to establish a means of "fully communicating with all their units to stop fighting," and prevent mistrust from developing. During these meetings, Redwan Hussein said that Ethiopia and Tigray were so busy fighting each other that it "paved the way for a third party to undermine us further." He further said that this third party "may not be interested in this peace process." The Associated Press interpreted this as an indirect comment about Eritrea.

On 9 November, Mohammed Idris, Director-General of the Ethiopian Media Authority (EMA), announced that new guidelines were being established for how the Ethiopian media reports on news of these negotiations. This was done as a way to keep it in line with the peace agreement's rules against hate speech and propaganda, as "false information and hateful speech are counterproductive to the ideas of peace."

==== Humanitarian aid ====
By 9 November, concerns had emerged about the continued lack of humanitarian aid Tigray was receiving. Despite the agreement stating that Ethiopia must "mobilize and expedite humanitarian assistance for all those in need," and Redwan saying that "aid is flowing like no other times," a number of humanitarian agencies were reporting that they were being prevented from delivering aid. TPLF officials also denied this was the case, with Getachew telling AFP that Redwan was "plucking his facts out of thin air." A Tigray-based humanitarian worker expressed similar sentiments, saying the government's claim was untrue, and that "no aid is allowed to enter Shire city at all." After 12 November deal was made, Keiredin Tezera, an Ethiopian legislator, told Al Jazeera that aid was already being sent to areas under Ethiopian control, but that it "may even further facilitate" the delivery of aid. On the other hand, Yohannes Abraha, a North America representative for Tigray, also told the news outlet that aid had not been made available to the region since August 2022, and continued to remain inaccessible even after the signing of the Pretoria agreement.

WHO Director-General Tedros Adhanom Ghebreyesus – who is Tigrayan, and a former head of the Ethiopian Ministry of Health – initially welcomed news of the agreement; on 9 November, however, he expressed concern, saying "nothing is moving in terms of food aid or medicines." He emphasized his support for "giv[ing] peace a chance," but called for supplies to be delivered as soon as possible.

=== Nairobi Declaration ===
On 12 November, military leaders from both parties announced in a joint statement that, as part of the Nairobi declaration, they had agreed to lift the restrictions on aid to those who needed it in "Tigray and neighbouring regions"; Obasanjo made assurances that humanitarian access would "begin with immediate effect." Later that same day, Ethiopian authorities stated that they were making efforts to "deliver humanitarian assistance to most of the Tigray region," of which around 70% was now under their control. They both also signed a declaration reaffirming their commitment to the original agreement, laid out the specifics of how to implement it, and agreed to begin the Tigrayan disarmament process on 15 November.

== 2026 conflict and second interim administration ==
During 2026, fighting took place during the 2026 Ethiopian offensive. After the ENDF and Tigray Peace Force (TPF) retook control of Mekelle, a second interim administration was established on 16 October 2026, for a declared intended duration of six months, with a rotating presidency, and a declared intention of enabling a new Tigray regional election to be held by the National Election Board of Ethiopia by April 2027. By 5 November, about 5500 former Tigray Defense Forces (TDF) members had disarmed as part of a disarmament, demobilization and reintegration process, and were participating in rehabilitation at training centre in Mekelle.

== Analysis ==
Adib Saani, a foreign policy analyst based in Ghana, was critical of what he considered to be a noncommittal approach to bringing peace by Western governments, the UN, and the warring parties themselves, stating in late September 2022 that the only way to end the war was for all parties to make a genuine effort towards peace.

=== Eritrea ===
On 19 February 2021, Alex de Waal saw Eritrea's role as the "centre of gravity" of the Tigray War. He predicted that a withdrawal of the EDF from Tigray Region would lead to the ENDF losing control of most of Tigray. This would force Abiy to acknowledge the nature of the war as a civil war and negotiate "a ceasefire and mediation leading to a political settlement." Eritrea's participation in the war has been heavily criticized as a major obstacle for peace, with the Crisis Group's William Davison arguing in October 2022 that "there is no indication that Eritrea will participate in peace negotiations, or that it is interested in an amicable solution."

=== Debates about Tigrayan secession ===
The possibility of Tigray seceding from Ethiopia has been the subject of debate by Tigrayans. As of 2021, secession was opposed by senior officials within the TPLF and popular among younger people in Tigray, with expectations that an independence referendum could be organised.

== See also ==
- OLA peace process – Peace process to end the insurgency of the Oromo Liberation Army in Ethiopia
