= Tintal library =

Bogotá Public Library

Coordinates: 4.6430°N 74.1548°W

El Tintal Manuel Zapata Olivella Public Library
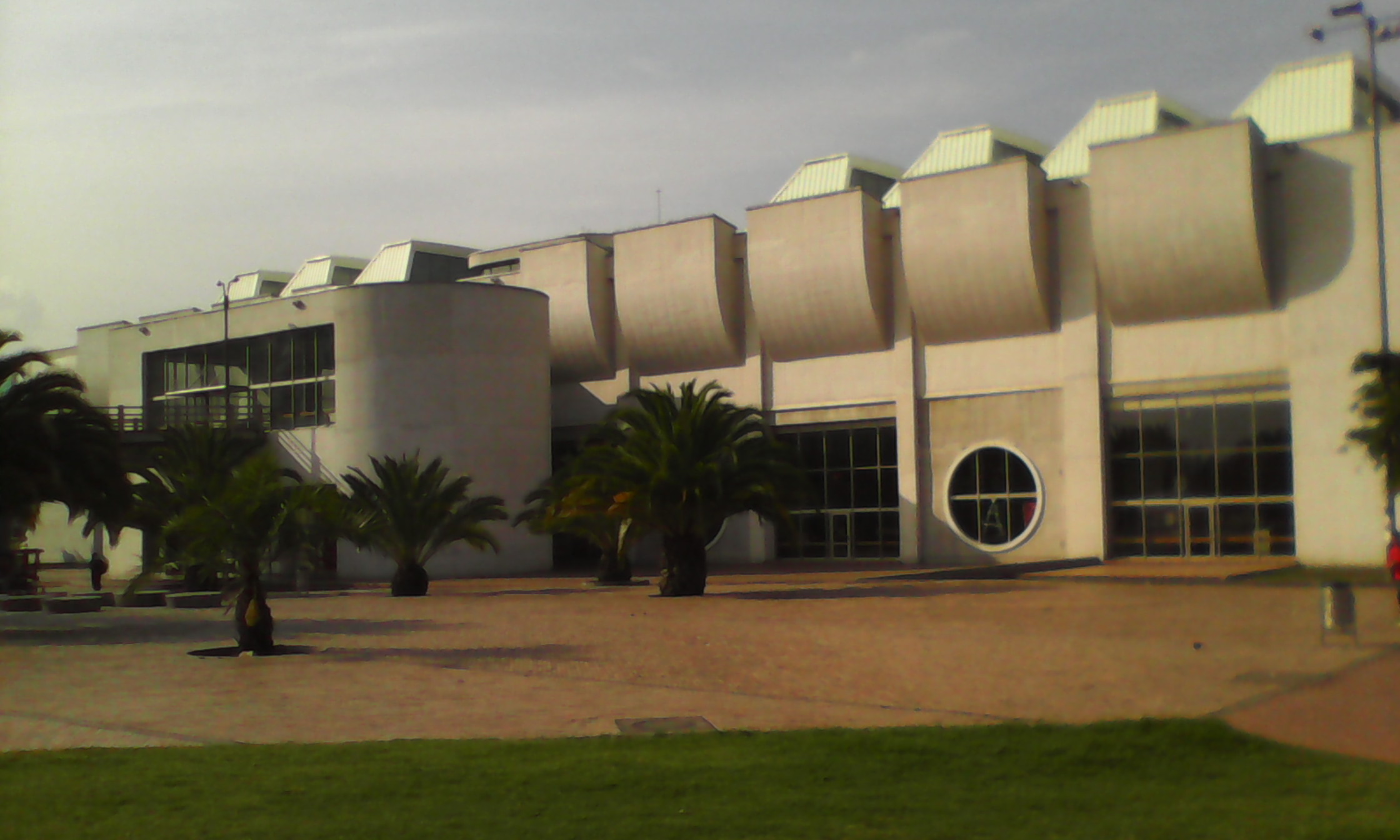
- Location: Colombia
- Type: Public
- Architect: Daniel Bermúdez
- Service area: 6.650 m²

The El Tintal Manuel Zapata Olivella Public Library, part of BibloRed, is located in the west of Bogotá, Colombia, on Ciudad de Cali Avenue. It was designed by the architect Daniel Bermúdez. Formerly, it operated as a waste and garbage treatment plant, Protecho, owned by the company EDIS, but it was abandoned. Its construction began in 1998 and was completed in 2002.

== Characteristics ==
The library has an area of 6,650 m2 and a capacity of 150,000 volumes. It has a reading room for young people and adults with a capacity of 500 people, consisting of a reference room, a newspaper and periodical section, rooms for group work, a multimedia room, and a computer room. Additionally, there is a children's room with a capacity for 200 children, including a reading room, workshops, a playroom, and multimedia facilities. Among its facilities, there is also an auditorium for 160 people, three multipurpose rooms, a temporary exhibition hall, and a room with information about Bogotá.

== Access ==
The library is located on City of Cali Avenue, near to the New Castilla area and the Tintal Plaza shopping centre, in the Kennedy District, west of Bogotá. In addition to the City of Cali Avenue, Las Americas Avenue serves as a route to reach the library thanks to the Transmilenio service and other regular ways of public transportation.

== History ==
The waste treatment plant was established in 1989 with an estimated lifespan of 5 to 7 years. It was in operation until the liquidation of EDIS (for "Empresa Distrital de Servicios Públicos", or District Public Services Company) in 1993.

In 1999, G. Sierra Mechanics Engineering was commissioned to carry out the "Diagnosis of the current state of the waste transfer plant", detailing the situation of each of the plant's components, the possible causes for its failure to function properly, and the minimum conditions necessary to seek some utilization of the existent parts on site. The document is a precedent for the origin of the Manuel Zapata Olivella El Tintal Public Library, which was built on the site where the plant used to operate.

The library opened on June 29th, 2001, making a transition "from garbage to reading", in the words of its architect Daniel Bermúdez. In 2006, it was named the Metropolitan Public Library Tintal "Manuel Zapata Olivella", according to Agreement 224 of 2006 of the Bogotá Council.

== See also ==
- Virgilio Barco Public Library
- Tunal Public Library
- BibloRed
- List of libraries in Colombia

== Bibliography ==
- VV. AA., director Fabio Puyo Vasco, Historia de Bogotá 3 tomos: Tomo I - Conquista y Colonia, Tomo II - Siglo XIX, Tomo III - Siglo XX, Bogotá, 2007. ISBN 9789588293318.
