= Tigray Interim Council =

Upper house of the Tigray Regional State parliament

- ግዝያዊ ቤት-ምኽሪ ትግራይ

Overview
- Established: 2 February 2025
- State: Tigray Region
- Country: Ethiopia
- Leader: Chief Administrator
- Annual budget: Annual budget of the government
- Headquarters: Mekelle, Tigray Region, Ethiopia

The Tigray Interim Council (TIC) (formerly established as the Tigray Advisory Council) is a body established in Tigray Region, Ethiopia, as part of the implementation of the Pretoria Agreement signed in November 2022 between the Ethiopian government and the Tigray People's Liberation Front (TPLF). Its formation faced significant delays, primarily due to internal disputes within the TPLF. The council's first emergency meeting took place from 14–16 February 2025.

== Background and establishment ==
The council was intended to replace the disbanded Tigray Regional State Council. TIRA President Getachew Reda signed a 25-page regulation on 2 April 2024, outlining the council's mandate and operational procedures. However, its formal establishment was delayed by 306 days due to opposition from a TPLF faction led by Debretsion Gebremichael and Fetlework Gebregziabher. They reportedly instructed local TPLF offices not to send representatives to the council. Negotiations between TIRA leadership and the dissenting TPLF faction were unsuccessful, resulting in their continued absence from the council.

== Composition ==
Article 7 of the council's regulation originally outlined the following composition:

- 38 members representing electoral districts
- 9 members from civil society organizations
- 40 members from political parties (including representatives from TPLF, Baytona, TIP, Arena Tigray, Assimba, and Axumay Waela)
- 6 members from Tigray's security forces
- 2 members representing the Irob and Kunama communities
- 3 members from Tigrayans residing in Addis Ababa
- 3 members from the Tigrayan diaspora

Following its first meeting, the council's membership was expanded to 152 members to ensure broader representation.

== Responsibilities and structure ==
The council is accountable to the law, the conscience, and the people of Tigray. The Supreme Court, Auditor, Media Agency, and the Endowment Fund for the Rehabilitation of Tigray (EFFORT) report to the council. The council chair reports to the head of TIRA. The council operates through specialized committees covering areas such as Economic Development, Infrastructure and Rehabilitation, Social Development, Resource Administration and Audit, Peace and Security, and Youth and Women Affairs.

== Emergency meeting (February 2025) ==
The council's first emergency meeting, held from 14–16 February 2025, focused on several key issues, including:

- Amending Article No. 10/2016 of the council's term of reference, changing accountability from the President of TIRA to "Conscience, Law, and the People."
- Approving draft guidelines and ethics for council members.
- Reviewing six-month plans from responsible institutions.
- Finalizing appointments for standing committee leadership.
- Increasing council membership to 152.
- Establishing permanent standing committees.
- Renaming the council from Advisory Council to Interim Council.

Dejen Mezgebe, leader of the opposition party TIP, served as deputy chair and chaired the meeting.

== Speakers of the Interim Council ==
The speaker of the Interim Council is the presiding officer of the council.

Name	Position	Affiliation	Entered office	Left office
Moges Tafere	Chair	TPLF	2 February 2025	Present
Dejen Mezgebe (Ph.D)	deputy chair	TIP	2 February 2025	Present

== Challenges and perspectives ==
The establishment of the Tigray Interim Council is seen by some as a step forward for governance in the region. However, challenges remain, including the lack of participation from a significant TPLF faction and concerns raised by other opposition parties like Salsay Weyane Tigray regarding the council's legitimacy and effectiveness. They argue that the council lacks democratic legitimacy and could be used to consolidate power. The council's future effectiveness in addressing the needs of the Tigrayan population remains to be seen.

== See also ==
- Interim Regional Administration of Tigray
