= Eritrean involvement in the Tigray war =

Eritrea in the Tigray War

Eritrean involvement in the Tigray War
- Part of Tigray War
Date	November 2020 – November 2022
Location	Tigray Region, Ethiopia; Eritrea

Belligerents
Eritrea; In support of: Ethiopia	Tigray: Tigray People's Liberation Front

Commanders and leaders
(Eritrea) Isaias Afwerki (Eritrea) Filipos Woldeyohannes (Eritrea) Teklai Manjus	Debretsion Gebremichael; Fetlework Gebregziabher; Tsadkan Gebretensae; Tadesse Werede Tesfay

Units involved
Eritrean Defence Forces: Eritrean Army; Eritrean Air Force	Tigray Defense Forces

The Eritrean government was heavily involved in the Tigray war against the Tigray People's Liberation Front (TPLF) in support of the Ethiopian government, from November 2020 until after the ceasefire two years later.

== Background ==
During the Ethiopian Civil War (1974–1991), both the Eritrean People's Liberation Front (EPLF) and the Tigray People's Liberation Front (TPLF) allied with each other, first against the Derg, and then the People's Democratic Republic of Ethiopia after 1987. These friendly relations initially continued after they won the civil war and Eritrea gained its independence from Ethiopia – this time, run by a TPLF-led coalition government called the Ethiopian People's Revolutionary Democratic Front (EPRDF). However, relations deteriorated significantly due to disagreements about the exact location of the new Ethiopian–Eritrean border, eventually culminating in a full-scale war between the two states, in which both countries engaged in human rights violations, including rape, torture, beatings, internment and forced expulsions of civilians.

On 12 December 2000, the Algiers Agreement between Ethiopia and Eritrea was signed, marking an official end to major hostilities. Among other conditions, the treaty also established an independent commission to determine the exact placement of the border. In 2002, the Permanent Count of Arbitration awarded small portions of territory to both states; they also ruled, however, that Badme, a town that was at the centre of the border dispute, belonged to Eritrea (while also finding, in a 2005 ruling, that Eritrea broke international law by attempting to take the town through an invasion). Although both countries initially agreed to respect this agreement, by 2003, Ethiopia had rejected it, primarily due to the Badme decision, and Eritrea was not interested in a renegotiation.

Relations between Eritrea and the TPLF-led Ethiopia continued to remain tense as a result of these disagreements, becoming a sticking point in the ensuing border conflict. Through the 2000s and most of the 2010s, both countries engaged in sporadic battles and border skirmishes. Reportedly, they also funded proxy conflicts against each other throughout the region, including insurgencies in Afar, Ogaden, and Somalia. Eritrea has used Ethiopia’s continued presence in Badme as an official justification for its widely condemned practice of indefinite conscription, which has been ongoing since the 1990s. By the time the conflict drew to a close in 2018, Eritrea–TPLF relations had been actively hostile for roughly 20 years.

=== Converging interests with the new Ethiopian government ===
On 2 April 2018, Abiy Ahmed was sworn in by parliament as Ethiopia's new prime minister, following the resignation of Hailemariam Desalegn, who had done so in the wake of major protests against him. Very soon thereafter, Ethiopia announced a willingness to negotiate a peaceful end to the border conflict, a move that came as a surprise to both Eritrea and outside observers. Still, talks for peace went forward, and 3 months after Abiy's term began, the conflict officially ended with the Eritrea–Ethiopia peace summit; with this, Ethiopia accepted Eritrean territorial claims over Badme, and diplomatic relations were reestablished for the first time in decades. For many, this summit was widely celebrated, and in 2019, Abiy received a Nobel Peace Prize for these efforts.

However, many within the Tigray Region, including the residents of Badme itself, were heavily critical of this motion for peace, and saw this as a betrayal, or a "desecration" of those who died in the 1998–2000 war. According to Reuters, one local official was quoted as saying that, while they were not against peace with Eritrea, they also "do not want peace by giving away this land after all the sacrifice." The people of Badme were allegedly not informed about the government's plans to do this. The TPLF condemned the peace initiatives, saying they were hastily made, had "fundamental flaws," and also claimed it was decided on without consulting long-time TPLF members.

There has been some speculation about the possible reasons for why Eritrean–Ethiopian relations shifted so significantly towards cooperation. Among some analysts, it has been suggested that this is due to a common animosity towards the TPLF held by both Eritrea, as well as non-Tigrayan Ethiopian officials that have resented the TPLF's dominance in Ethiopian politics since 1991. While relations with Ethiopia were in the process of being normalized, Eritrean President Isaias Afwerki was heavily critical of the TPLF, describing them as "vultures."

== History ==
=== 2020 ===
While official confirmation from Ethiopia and Eritrea did not occur until March–April 2021, Eritrea was already heavily suspected to be involved in the war since the beginning. According to the TPLF, one of their rationales for attacking the Ethiopian Northern Command in early November 2020 – the event generally considered to mark the beginning of the war – was "preemptive self-defense" against (what they claimed to be) an incoming, coordinated attack by Eritrean and Ethiopian forces. Eritrea regularly sent soldiers to support the Ethiopian federal government forces against the TPLF. Their involvement has wider implications, with Eritrea explicitly supporting Ethiopia militarily, a major change following two decades of hostile diplomatic relations.

On 28–29 November 2020, witnesses and survivors, including refugees in Sudan, reported that the Eritrean Defence Forces (EDF) carried out a massacre in Axum that killed between 100 and 800 civilians. These reports have been corroborated by a number of news agencies and human rights organizations. The Eritrean government stated that it was angered by Amnesty International's report on the massacre, claiming it was "transparently unprofessional" and "politically motivated," accusing Amnesty of fabricating evidence.

=== 2021 ===
The situation on the ground changed drastically following a guerilla warfare campaign by the TDF, and in February 2021, the UN chief coordinator of humanitarian efforts Mark Lowcock said that up to 40% of Tigray was not controlled by Ethiopian troops. He said that much of that area was under the control of Eritrean soldiers pursuing their own objectives independent of Ethiopian command.

Refugees told Vice World News that Eritrea was in control of parts of the northern Maekelay Zone and most likely extending beyond the zone. Different refugees told VICE that not only did Eritreans cross into border areas, but they also took control of the area. One refugee from Maekelay told them "Since the war started, we haven't seen a single Ethiopian soldier. Only Eritreans, they occupy the rural areas."

Tigrayan leaders alleged that the Eritrean forces' use of United Arab Emirates-made drones was a main factor for Tigray force resistance and re-entered to Mekelle in June 2021. On 16 June 2021, the Ethiopian ambassador to the UN stated that Eritrean troops in Tigray were to "definitely leave soon," but Eritrea would continue sending in forces long after this.

=== 2022 ===
Fighting largely subsided during the first ceasefire period from March through August of 2022.

The Ethiopia–Tigray Peace Agreement, signed in November 2022, established a permanent ceasefire between Ethiopia and Tigray although Eritrea was not a party to it. Eritrean forces continued to launch attacks on Tigrayans throughout November and December. From 17 to 25 November alone, Eritrea was reported to have destroyed 241 houses and killed at least 111 people.

=== 2023 ===
On 25 May 2023, a mission led by the United Nations Office for the Coordination of Humanitarian Affairs deputy head of Ethiopia, composed of the United Nations Office for the Coordination of Humanitarian Affairs, the United Nations Department for Safety and Security, the World Health Organization, and other international non-governmental organizations, was prohibited from entering Gemhalo village in Tahtay Adiyabo woreda [district] by Eritrean forces, according to aid workers.

== War crimes ==
The EDF (along with the ENDF, Amhara and Fano forces) were attributed responsibility for "killings of Tigrayan civilians on a massive scale", mainly during November and December 2020 and January 2021, by the International Commission of Human Rights Experts on Ethiopia. The EHRC–OHCHR Tigray investigation found that the EDF (along with the ENDF and Tigrayan Special Forces) may have committed war crimes and crimes against humanity during the war. The Commission of Inquiry on Tigray Genocide found that the majority of the sexual and gender-based violence during the war and the majority of infrastructure destruction, including scholasticide, was committed by the EDF (with the ENDF ranking second by the numbers of war crimes and crimes against humanity documented).

Amnesty International found that the EDF may have "committed war crimes and crimes against humanity" in Tigray during the months following the Pretoria agreement, raping, enslaving and executing civilians.
