= Timeline of the Tigray war (July 2021–November 2022) =

This Timeline of the Tigray War (July 2021 to present) is part of a chronology of the military engagements of the Tigray War, a civil war that began in the Tigray Region of Ethiopia in early November 2020.

== Timeline ==
=== July 2021 ===
==== 1 July ====
A bridge across the Tekezé River was partly destroyed.

==== 2 July ====
Around 7000 captured Ethiopian soldiers passed through Mekelle, on the way to a prison north of the city.

==== 3 July ====
The UN reports that 400,000 suffer from in famine in Tigray, with 1.8 million more at risk.

==== 6 July ====
The Tigrayan government began mobilization to retake western Tigray from Amhara militias.

==== 10 July ====
Fiyelwiha battle. A large group of Amhara militia from Wereta and the surrounding Fogera district had been occupying the Dima district in Tigray. On 10 July, they were defeated by the Tigray Defence Forces (TDF); several Wereta militiamen, including the head of the Peace and Security Bureau of the Fogera woreda were killed on the battlefield in Fiyelwiha, a small town of the Dima district.

==== 11 July ====
Following defeats of the ENDF and Amhara Special Forces in the Tigray War, the Fano (militia) took revenge on Tigrayan citizens in towns in Amhara region, killing people and looting shops, for instance in Wereta, where three Tigrayans were killed. In retaliation for the lost battle in Fiyelwiha the previous day, the Amhara Fano (militia) and mob murdered three civilians of Tigrayan origin in Wereta on 11 July 2021. Social media displayed imagery of the corpses been drag behind three wheel motorcycles, called “bajaj”.

==== 12–13 July ====
The TDF offensive started on 12 July 2021 resulted in Tigrayan forces capturing southern Tigray, including the towns of Alamata and Korem. The TDF subsequently crossed the Tekezé River and advanced westward, capturing the town of Mai Tsebri and prompting Amhara officials to call on its militias to arm themselves and mobilize.

==== 17 July ====
The TDF says it released about 1,000 captured Ethiopian soldiers at the Amhara-Tigray border.

==== 19 July ====
A 10 vehicle convoy of the World Food Programme was attacked in the city of Semera in Afar region.

==== 20 July ====
After controlling Kobo in the Amhara Region, the TDF did not harm the civilian population.

Regional forces from Oromia, Sidama, Somalia, and the Southern Nations, Nationalities and Peoples are mobilizing to support the ENDF in and around Tigray.

The TDF launched an invasion on Afar Region making gains and repelling an allied counterattack on the TDF lines reportedly capturing vehicles and equipment.

==== 22 July ====
The Afar regional government claims that 20 civilians were killed and 70,000 civilians displaced in clashes between the TDF and an alliance of ENDF and regional forces in Afar.

=== August 2021 ===
==== 10 August ====
Abiy calls on civilians to join the army amid a continuing conflict.

==== 13 August ====
Joe Biden sends a special envoy to Ethiopia to de-escalate the conflict.

==== 26 August ====
EHRC reports that over 210 are killed in ethnic violence in Oromia.

==== 27 August ====
The UN chief warns of a “humanitarian catastrophe” as war spreads beyond Tigray.

=== September 2021 ===
==== late August/early September ====
According to an Amnesty International report released on 16 February 2022, in late August and early September 2021, TPLF fighters "deliberately killed dozens of people, gang-raped dozens of women and girls — some as young as 14 — and looted private and public property in two areas of northern Ethiopia's Amhara region."

==== 31 August–4 September ====
Between 31 August and 4 September, TDF occupied the village of Chenna and adjacent areas in Dabat district. According to residents, TDF soldiers arrived demanding food, then killed those who resisted when fighters slaughtered their animals and looted their properties. The soldiers also shot at nearby Ethiopian troops from residential positions, drawing return fire on the residents. Government officials reported that the TDF massacred 120-200 civilians in all. Doctors at the hospital in nearby Dabat town put the death toll at 125 and counting. Human Rights Watch spoke to residents who witnessed 26 civilians summarily executed by the TDF in Chenna. The TDF denied the massacre. At least 30 women and girls were raped and sexually assaulted by TDF soldiers in and around Chenna during the occupation.

==== 9 September ====
Residents told VOA News by telephone that the TDF killed 600 civilians in Kobo district. According to residents, on 9 September TDF fighters entered villages in Kobo searching for weapons but farmers repelled the soldiers from the villages. As TDF fighters withdrew from those villages to the town of Kobo, they killed men and teenage boys who were working their fields in retaliation along the way. Later that day, residents witnessed dozens of civilians summarily executed by TDF fighters in the town of Kobo. Spatiotemporal satellite imagery analysis corroborated witness testimony of new graves dug at two church compounds in the town to bury those summarily executed.

==== 15 September ====
On 15 September, the Ethiopian Walta TV interviewed groups of light-armed militiamen in the Zobel hills at the east of Kobo, threatening the vital north–south road across the central Ethiopian highlands.

==== 23 September ====
It was reported that at least 150 people had starved to death in Tigray territories in the month of August, and that at least 400,000 people had reached famine conditions.

==== 27 September ====
The BBC reported that aid trucks were unable to transport crucial supplies to Tigray, as hundreds of trucks that made the journey from other parts of Ethiopia between July and September did not return, due to lack of fuel and hassling of drivers. The United Nations aid chief, Martin Griffiths assumed that famine has taken hold in Tigray, where a nearly three-month long "de-facto blockade" restricted aid deliveries to 10% of what is needed in the war-torn region.

==== 29 September ====
The UN accuses Ethiopia of a de facto blockade on Tigray; and the government denies.

==== 30 September ====
Amid UN concerns about a blockade of aid deliveries to Tigray, the Ethiopian government expelled 7 top UN officials, reportedly because of "meddling" in its internal affairs, giving the officials 72 hours to leave the country.

=== October 2021 ===
==== Early October ====
An intensive air campaign began against TDF positions in North Wollo by the Ethiopian Air Force.

==== 4 October ====
Abiy is sworn in for a new term amid the ongoing Tigray war.

==== 11 October ====
Ethiopian forces launch a new ground and air offensives to dislodge Tigray forces from Amhara and Afar.

==== 18 October ====
The Ethiopian Air Force killed three civilians in Mekelle. That day, Tigray forces reported airstrikes in Mekelle, which were first denied, later admitted by the Ethiopian government.

==== 20 October ====
The Ethiopian Air Force carried out a second series of airstrikes targeting inhabited areas of Mekelle city, and also on the small town of Agbe. A large enterprise, Mesfin Industrial Engineering, was also targeted, and one of its engineers got killed.

==== 21 and 22 October ====
Airstrikes continued on 21 and 22 October; the latter was nearby Mekelle University main campus, and Mekelle Airport and coincided with the landing time of a UN humanitarian flight. As a consequence, the UN cancelled further humanitarian flights to Mekelle.

==== 29 October ====
The TDF captured the town of Dessie with the Ethiopian government denying the claim.

==== 30 October ====
The TDF said they captured the town of Kombolcha and the OLA claimed to have captured the city of Kamisee from ENDF allied forces. The Ethiopian government denied the towns were captured.

=== November 2021 ===
==== 1 November ====
OLA and TDF forces said they officially met up.

==== 2 November ====
As the counter-offensive came deeper into federally-controlled territory, the Ethiopian government declared a six-month state of emergency.

==== 4 November ====
During an interview with Radio France Internationale, French historian and Horn of Africa expert Gérard Prunier explained that the bulk of the Eritrean army in Tigray is defending the border with Sudan (to prevent Tigrayan rebels from being supplied by Egypt, which is hostile to Abiy Ahmed's government) and to protect Eritrea's border with Tigray, thus leaving the defense of Addis Ababa mostly to Amhara militias in the face of heavy losses sustained by Ethiopia's federal army.

==== 10 November ====
Amnesty International accuses Tigrayan rebel fighters of gang raping women in Ethiopia

==== 11 November ====
In view of rebels advancing on the capital city, fears are expressed for the safety of the Mugher plant (operated by Dangote Cement), located at 90 km northwest of Addis Ababa.

==== 12 November ====
WHO’s Tedros says that Tigray is under a “systematic blockade”, with people starving to death.

==== 17 November ====
UN says that 1,000+ Tigrayans have been detained since the emergency declaration.

==== 23 November ====
Prime Minister Abiy Ahmed said he campaigned to lead his army into battleground.

==== 24 November ====
Abiy joins the frontlines to lead the military in battle against the TPLF.

==== 28 November ====
The Ethiopian state television announced that the Ethiopian troops take control of Chifra, a district located in Afar Region.

=== December 2021 ===
==== 1 December ====
The Ethiopian government said they recaptured Shewa Robit 220 km (135 miles) far from Addis Ababa. It was occupied by Tigray forces earlier. According to the Minister of Ethiopian Government Communications Legese Tulu, they also retook nearby towns like Debre Sina, Wegeltena, Mezezo, Mollale. They retook Lalibela, as well.

==== 5 December ====
The Ethiopian government claimed that they recaptured Dessie and Kombolcha.

==== 12 December ====
Reuters reported that forces loyal to the TPLF had recaptured the town of Lalibela less than two weeks after government forces and their allies had recaptured control of the town for themselves.

==== 16 December ====
Amnesty and HRW report mass killings and expulsions by the Amhara forces in western Tigray.

==== 18 December ====
Legesse Tulu, head of Government Communication Service, announced that government forces have taken control of several towns from TPLF, including: Weldiya, Kobo, Lalibela, Hara, Robit, Sanqa, Sirinka, Hamusit, Estaysh, Ahun Tegen, Dilb, and Kul Mesk.

==== 19 December ====
Ethiopian Government, announced that deputy prime minister Demeke Mekonnen visited Lalibela following its recapture.

==== 20 December ====
Getachew Reda, spokesman of the TPLF, announced that the TPLF forces were withdrawing from several areas of northern Ethiopia in order to "open the door to humanitarian aid."

==== 23 December ====
On 23 December, the Ethiopian government announced that its military forces would temporarily halt any excursions into Tigray.

==== 24 December ====
Ethiopian forces purportedly massacred an unknown number of people in the town of Abala. Soldiers went door to door killing ethnic Tigrayans but spared non-Tigrayan civilians.

=== January 2022 ===
==== 7 January ====
Ethiopia announced pardons for high-profile political prisoners. Its government said it will release several leading TPLF members and opposition leaders from the Oromo and Amhara ethnic groups.

Aid workers say an airstrike at an IDP camp in Dedebit, northwest Tigray, killed 56 people.

==== 10 January ====
According to aid workers and hospital officials, 17 people working at a flour mill, were killed in drone strikes in the town of Mai Tsebri. It was reported the strikes injured dozens of people and killed 16 donkeys.

==== 11 January ====
According to an official and a doctor at Mekele's main hospital, 2 people were killed and dozens injured in a drone strike in Hiwane.

==== 13 January ====
The WHO chief describes Tigray as experiencing unmatched humanitarian suffering.

==== 28 January ====
The WFP says that over one-third of Tigrayans face extreme food shortages.

=== February 2022 ===
==== 3 February ====
Militants reportedly belonging to the TPLF attacked an Eritrean refugee camp in Berhale, killing at least five people. Thousands were displaced and several women were abducted.

==== 15 February ====
The Ethiopian parliament ends the state of emergency early.

=== March 2022 ===
==== 11 March ====
The EHRC reports that 750 were civilians killed in the Amhara and Afar regions in late 2021.

==== 24 March ====
TPLF and Ethiopian forces agreed to make a ceasefire in order to allow humanitarian aid into Tigray.

=== April 2022 ===
==== 1 April ====
Aid trucks enter Tigray-controlled territory for the first time since mid-December 2021.

==== 25 April ====
Tigrayan rebels pull out of parts of the Afar region.

=== May 2022 ===
==== 17 May ====
Ethiopia and the World Bank sign a $300m grant deal for post-conflict recovery.

==== 20 May ====
The TPLF says it will release 4,028 government soldiers it captured as part of a series of ongoing negotiations.

=== June 2022 ===
==== 14 June ====
The federal government forms a peace negotiation committee, signaling movement toward talks.

=== August 2022 ===
==== 2 August ====
The US and EU urge Ethiopia to restore services in Tigray amid continued hardship.

==== 17 August ====
The Ethiopian government proposes a formal ceasefire to resume basic services.

==== 20 August ====
The World Food Programme reports that nearly half of Tigray’s population is in severe need of food assistance.

==== 24 August ====
The ceasefire ends; and fighting resumes around Kobo town.

==== 26 August ====
Ethiopian government forces conducted an air raid in Mekelle which struck a kindergarten and surrounding houses, leaving four dead - two of them children. Witnesses reported an explosion followed by anti-aircraft gunfire. The Ethiopian government denied hitting the kindergarten; instead claiming they were targeting military sites, although it wasn’t immediately clear if there were any in the area, and alleged that the TPLF had actually staged the dead bodies. Both Federal Government spokesman Tulu and Military spokesman Adane refused to respond to inquiries about the attack.

=== September 2022 ===
==== 1 September ====
Ethiopian and Eritrean forces launch a new offensive in Tigray.

==== 11 September ====
The TPLF announces a readiness to join AU-led peace talks.

==== 20 September ====
Tigrayan forces report an Eritrean full-scale offensive along the border.

=== October 2022 ===
==== 5 October ====
Both sides accept the AU invitation for peace talks in South Africa.

==== 17 October ====
Ethiopian forces capture the strategic northern town of Shire.

==== 25 October ====
Peace talks begin in Pretoria between Ethiopian government and TPLF.

=== November 2022 ===
==== 2 November ====
The Ethiopian government and the TPLF agree to a permanent cessation of hostilities.

==== 7 November ====
Ethiopian and Tigrayan representatives meet in Nairobi to discuss peace implementation.
