= Anti-Eritrean sentiment =

Opposition, hatred and bias toward Eritrea

Anti-Eritrean sentiment is a broad opposition, bias, discrimination and hatred against Eritrea, its government and people. Anti-Eritrean attitude is prevalent amongst Tigrayan elites, who were crucial parts for the downfall of the Derg regime in 1991. The 1998 border war exacerbated their relations as both parties accused each other for the territorial claims. Eritrean involvement in the Tigray War further aggravated anti-Eritrean feelings amongst Tigrayans.

== In Ethiopia ==
In 1977, the Eritrean People's Liberation Front (EPLF) launched attack on oil refinery amidst the Ethiopian Civil War and began naval attacks on 25 April 1988. When Assab was liberated by EPLF in the final battle, 40,000 civilians and Ethiopian POWs repatriated who took shelter outside Addis Ababa. They expressed anti-Eritrean sentiment due to shortage of petroleum and oil products in Addis Ababa transported through Assab. Many Amharan nationalist opposition groups expressed anti-Eritrean sentiment who used Eritrean independence and handover of Red Sea to Eritrea as means to consolidate EPLF new government led by Isaias Afwerki. They accused Ethiopian Prime Minister Meles Zenawi for cementing "special relationship" with Afwerki who dismantle the Derg government together in 1991. Hence, there was broad opposition to Eritrean politics when UN Secretary-General Boutros Boutros-Ghali visited Addis Ababa before going to Asmara in 1993 to endorse Eritrean independence referendum. Ethiopian university students took protest his visit in which the government shot seven dead and some teachers and staffs sacked.

On 25 May 2023, anti-Eritrean sentiment in Ethiopia increased as a result of fear that Eritreans would spy on Ethiopia for its own political gains. Around 70,000 Eritreans deported from Ethiopia. Especially starting from November 2024, Eritreans felt animosity while in Ethiopia and reported widespread arrests among their community, escalating fears among the refugees and asylum seekers. In Addis Ababa, ethnic profiling was significant where hundreds of Eritreans were detained by security force amidst government crackdown.

== In Tigray ==
The Tigray People's Liberation Front (TPLF) had positive opinion toward Eritrea during the Ethiopian Civil War until mid-1980s, and between the Eritrean independence until Badme War 1998. TPLF-led Ethiopian government accused Eritrea for its arrogance of reclaiming border in accordance with the Italian colonial administration. Both engaged frozen conflict and skirmishes roughly in 20 years until Prime Minister Abiy Ahmed signed joint declaration to end border conflict on 9 July 2018. The 2022 Bertelsmann Transformation Index report highlighted that "The border between the two countries was not demarcated due to the opposition of the Tigray regional government. Instead of demobilizing its forcibly recruited army, the Eritrean government has been engaged in an undeclared war against the Tigray People’s Liberation Front (TPLF) in Tigray alongside Ethiopian federal forces since November 2020, which has resulted in a humanitarian catastrophe." A Tripartite Agreement was signed in September 2018 that fosters a diplomatic and trade relationship.

On 4 November 2020, Ethiopia with other regional militias and forces began war with Tigray government. Further Eritrean involvement in the war had tense animosity towards Eritrea amongst Tigrayans. On 29 November 2020, the Times reported TPLF claims that Eritrea was "wading into the conflict by deploying troops against them". However, it noted:

Communications to Tigray have been cut off by the government, which has made it impossible to verify claims of atrocities perpetrated by both sides. The Ethiopian human rights commission has accused militia linked to the TPLF of massacring hundreds of laborer's from the neighboring Amhara region. Amhara and Tigray have been embroiled in territorial disputes for decades.

In March 2021, Prime Minister Abiy Ahmed confirmed Eritrean involvement after previously denying their role for months.
