= Yemane Niguse =

Ethiopian politician (died 2021)

- የማነ ንጉሴ

Co-founder of the Fenkil Tigray Movement
- In office 2020–2021

Personal details
- Born: 1980 Hewane, Tigray Province, Ethiopia
- Died: 20 February 2021; Hewane, Tigray Region, Ethiopia
- Citizenship: Ethiopia
- Party: Fenkil Tigray

Military service
- Allegiance: Ethiopia
- Battles/wars: Tigray War

Yemane Niguse (Amharic: የማነ ንጉሴ; 1980s – 20 February 2021) was an Ethiopian politician who co-founded the Fenkil Tigray Movement.

== Early life ==
Niguse was born in Hewane, a small town in the Tigray Region in Ethiopia. He became a teacher before becoming politically active.

== Political career ==
Niguse was known for being critical of the TPLF government and especially argued against the integrity of the regional election held in 2020. His most notable political contribution was popularizing the Fenkil Tigray Movement by using social media. His method of spreading awareness of Fenkil was especially successful amongst youths. Fenkil's political objective was to, "free Tigray's people from the pressure of TPLF ... spreading across many towns in the Tigray region."

In July 2020, four months prior to the start of the Tigray War, as leader of the Fenkil Movement, Yemane criticised the TPLF for what he said was the recruitment of Tigrayan youths into military training on false pretences. According to Yemane, the youths were given promises of land that were not fulfilled, and the TPLF claimed that the Ethiopian National Defense Force (ENDF) and the Eritrean Defence Forces (EDF) were planning to attack Tigray Region. The TPLF claimed that the Fenkil Movement was supported by the government of Eritrea.

== Assassination ==
Niguse was assassinated on 20 February 2021 in his hometown at Hewane. He was found dead alongside two members of his security detail. According to Borkena Media, "The Ethiopian government confirmed that the activist is killed, and linked the assassination to what it called remnants [of] Tigray People's Liberation Front."
