= Seb Hidri =

- Established: 2018 (8 years ago)
- Types: non-governmental organization
- Location: Tigray Region
- Country: Ethiopia

Seb Hidri Civil Society of Tigray is a non-governmental organisation based in Tigray Region in Ethiopia, created in 2018.

== Creation ==
Seb Hidri was created in 2018.

== Aims ==
Seb Hidri describes its aims as promoting democracy, justice and active citizenship to defend the rights of Tigrayans "through peaceful and nonviolent discourse", and the promotion and defence of Tigrayan sovereignty and territorial integrity.

In May 2020, Bahlbi Y. Malk described Seb Hidri as promoting Tigray independence and tending to promote the extension of Tigray to include Eritrea, based on a vision of ethnic homogeneity between Tigrinya speaking people in Tigray Region and those in Eritrea.

== Leadership ==
In September 2019, Mehari Yohannes, who had been a member of the Tigray People's Liberation Front (TPLF) until 2016, was director of Seb Hidri. According to Getachew Gebrekiros Temare, writing in Ethiopia Insight, Mehari used Seb Hidri to promote political independence for Tigray, "preach[ing] a secessionist gospel".

As of January 2020, Dr. Goytom Aregawi (or Goitom) was director.

== Membership and politics ==
In 2019, Seb Hidri's membership included "youths, academics, and veteran fighters" and was "ideologically diverse". Some members promoted independence for Tigray.

== Reports and actions ==
On 31 March 2019 (Mägabit 22, 2011), Seb Hidri held a town meeting in Gere-alta. Some of the participants in the meeting were detained, fired or were subjected to other harassment by local authorities following the meeting. Seb Hidri interpreted the attacks as an attempt to frighten the participants from publicly discussing human rights, in violation of the 1995 Constitution of Ethiopia.

=== September 2020 Tigray election ===
Seb Hidri strongly promoted holding an election in Tigray Region, helping to modify Tigray Region electoral law. Seb Hidri was banned from observing the 2020 Tigray regional election itself by the Tigray Region electoral commission after a complaint by TPLF that Seb Hidri "engag[ed] in illegal activities". Meressa Tsehaye of the electoral commission stated that the TPLF had provided proof of the illegal activities. Goytom Aregawi of Seb Hidri stated that no details of the claim were provided.

=== Tigray War ===
On 21 February 2021, Seb Hidri described the first 110 days of the Tigray War as "a political crisis [that] ended up [as] one of the bloodiest wars in the world, and the first conventional war [on] African soil conducted with such a massive scale of high-precision fighter drone missile bombardment." It stated that the events of the first 110 days were "mass killings, rampant rapes, disappearances, internal displacement and migration, looting and destruction of health facilities and schools, intentional killing of domestic animals, burning of crops, blockage of humanitarian aid, communication blackout[s], [and] electricity blackout[s] in most parts of Tigray." Seb Hidri criticised the international community for "appalling silence and inaction" that "[gave] a green-light [for] ongoing genocide on ethnic Tigray[ans]". The organisation called for immediate peace process actions by the international community; a ceasefire; opening of access for humanitarian aid and international media; independent investigations of war crimes; withdrawal of the Eritrean Defence Forces and Amhara Region forces from Tigray Region; withdrawal of the Ethiopian National Defense Force (ENDF) from Tigray Region and its replacement by a United Nations peacekeeping force; restoration of telecommunications and electric power; investigations into the extrajudicial killings of journalists and politicians including Seyoum Mesfin; the release of all political prisoners; and a UNESCO-led investigation of the destruction of cultural heritage.
