= 2021–2022 Ethiopian state of emergency =

State of emergency in response to the Tigray War

- Part of Tigray War
- Date: 5 November 2021 – 15 February 2022
- Cause: TDF allied offensive
- Outcome: TDF and allies pushed back to the Tigray Region

The 2021–2022 Ethiopian state of emergency was issued by the Ethiopian Government on 2 November 2021 and put into effect on 5 November by the Ethiopian parliament, which acted the bill from the executive government of the country into law. The six month state of emergency grants federal authorities "sweeping powers to arrest and detain critics, impose curfews and restrict the news media" as well as conscript any citizen over 18 to fight in the Tigray War.

The emergency was lifted on 15 February 2022 in a vote by the Ethiopian Parliament three weeks after the cabinet of Prime Minister Abiy Ahmed approved of lifting the emergency.

== Background ==
The Ethiopian National Defense Force (ENDF) suffered a defeat in June 2021 when forced to withdraw from the Tigray Region in the north of Ethiopia, and several thousand of its soldiers were taken captive. The state of emergency in November was declared after Tigray Defense Forces (TDF) took Dessie and Kombolcha, "strategically located towns" on a north-south highway leading to the capital Addis Ababa.

== Legal creation ==
The House of Peoples Representatives approved the state of emergency proclamation that was referred to it by the Council of Ministers. The Council of Ministers declared the State of Emergency 5/14 in relation to armed conflict involving the Tigray People's Liberation Front (TPLF) in relation to the Tigray War and the Oromo Liberation Army (OLA) in relation to the Oromo conflict.

== Actions ==
Effects of the state of emergency in early November 2021 included mass detentions of "anyone of Tigrayan descent, many of whom had no ties to the rebels or even affinity for them," including "mothers with children and the elderly". Laetitia Bader of Human Rights Watch described the state of emergency as "'legitimizing and legalizing unlawful practices' and creating a 'real climate of fear'.

Online hate speech increased in November. Journalists, politicians, and pro-federal-government activists called ethnic Tigrayans "traitors", called for neighbours to "weed" them, and called for authorities to detain ethnic Tigrayans in "concentration camps".

== See also ==
- Timeline of the Tigray War (July 2021–present)
- 2016–2018 Ethiopian state of emergency
