= BibloRed =

BibloRed is the District network of Public Libraries and Alternative Reading Spaces of Bogotá, Colombia. It is a system that seeks to provide citizens with the opportunities to engage with books, reading, writing, orality, culture, research, science, technology, and innovation. Its 145 spaces operate under the guidance of the Mayor's Office of Bogotá, initially through its Secretariat of Education (2001–2013) and later through its Secretariat of Culture, Recreation and Sports (2013 - Currently).

Since 1998, BibloRed has managed information and knowledge, promoted inclusion in written culture, and encouraged the development of oral skills among the city's inhabitants. Furthermore, its spaces are open for the public construction of knowledge and the cultural empowerment of communities. Through these means, it fosters freedom and social as well as individual prosperity as fundamental tools for human development.

== Governance structure ==
In 2024, BibloRed comprises 145 reading spaces distributed throughout the city: the books are in motion on Transmilenio with the 12 Book Stations (Bibloestaciones); they reach every district with the 95 Bus Stops for Books in Parks (Paraderos Para libros Para Parques - PPP), the BibloMóvil, 2 Itinerant Libraries, 4 Reading Rooms, and 2 Trust Libraries. Additionally, it provides access to a collection of over 800.000 physical material in the 32 Public Libraries (major, local and from the neighborhoods), and more than 3'000.000 digital resources in the Digital Library of Bogotá.

The Network is a program of the Secretariat of Culture, Recreation, and Sports of Bogotá that operates under the concession model, where a private entity manages and executes public budgets. From a Central Office, an operator promotes the execution of the budget in coordination with each of the libraries, ensuring efficiency in budget administration, as well as quality and innovation in its programs and services.

Bogotá's libraries, besides offering books, have been characterized as cultural activity centers, including spaces for activities such as art exhibitions, musical shows, film projections, computer access, handicraft courses, co-creation labs, etc. This has allowed libraries to become dynamic cultural centers for the neighbors and districts to which they belong. The four main libraries are located in public parks, so in the surroundings of their buildings, spaces for physical and recreational activities are available.

== Historical review ==
Founded in 1998, BibloRed opened its doors to the public in 2001 with the services of the Virgilio Barco Public Library, El Tunal - Gabriel García Márquez y El Tintal - Manuel Zapata Olivella park libraries. That same year, the local and neighbourhoods existent libraries were integrated. In 2010, the fourth major library, the Julio Mario Santo Domingo, was delivered to the city. The four library parks of BibloRed have become architectural and urban icons of the city which, along with the local and neighborhood libraries, represent the other dimension of public space at the service of access to information and culture.

Since its inception, under the premise of opening libraries for everyone, libraries for the city, BibloRed has promoted a significant transformation of social imaginaries of the public libraries by ensuring spaces for all kind of audiences: children, youth, adults, seniors, women, LGBTI population, ethnic minorities, among others, find accessible and inclusive spaces within the Public Libraries Network.

During the 2010 decade, BibloRed stood out in the "Bogotá cómo vamos" survey for being one of the public entities with the best management, performance, and favorability, achieving citizen recognition as an important public asset in administration.

=== Location ===
Libraries that take part in the BibloRed project organises in five territorial nodes, in which each major library has articulation functions for the planning and execution of activities within local and neighbourhood libraries, that has impact over its territory, oriented by the directorship of the Reading and Libraries Direction.

Libraries extend their scope of action through extension programs with hospitals, children's homes, kindegardens, day care centres, rehabilitation centres, shelters, community canteens, prisons, NGOs, displaced people units, which aim to build social fabric and community development.

Awards

BibloRed has received significant recognitions such as the ATLA (Access to Learning Award) from the Bill & Melinda Gates Foundation in 2002. The newspaper El Colombiano, from Medellín, awarded BibloRed as 'Colombian Exemplar,' for being an institution dedicated to building a better country through reading and culture. In 2003, 'Places of Living Culture' was granted by the Independent Association of Journalists, Writers, and Professionals in New Communication Technologies of Spain (AIPEP). Bogotá also had the honor of being designated by UNESCO as the World Book Capital in 2007. The Kreanta Foundation of Spain selected BibloRed in 2008 in the category of good practices, within the framework of a bilateral cultural cooperation project. In 2011, the Congress of the Republic of Colombia granted a special recognition to BibloRed for its 10 years of service to the citizenry, for being the most important network for information and knowledge management, which has promoted the social appropriation of reading, research, culture, and ICTs, contributing to the improvement of the quality of life of different populations, especially those in vulnerable conditions.

In September 2015, the Julio Mario Santo Domingo Public Library, belonging to BibloRed, was a finalist, due to its library management model, in the 'II National Prize for Public Libraries Daniel Samper Ortega' held by the Ministry of Culture and the National Library of Colombia. In the same year, the National University of Colombia selected three of the libraries of the network among the 10 most innovative public libraries in the country.

== Collections ==
=== Physical collections ===
- Books
- Magazines and newspapers
- Audiovisuals (movies, documentaries, music, etc.)
- Materials for people with visual impairments (Braille books, audiobooks, specialized software)
- Local Collections (Development plans, procedures, local history)

== Digital Collections - Bogotá Digital Library ==
The Bogotá Digital Library is a remote access channel to all kinds of selected and organized contents in different areas of knowledge. It is also a meeting space for learning, self-training, knowledge exchange, research and citizen participation. Furthermore, it is a space for the dissemination of literature, history, memory, and culture of Bogotá and its inhabitants.

Its search engine allows access to the digital and physical resources of the District Public Library Network of Bogotá, BibloRed, including:

Platforms of books and magazines, where you can consult:

- More than 22,500 novels, short stories, comics, and books of fiction, non-fiction, and poetry for all ages.
- More than 1600 technical books on computer science, medicine, physics, biology, and chemistry for students, experts, and enthusiasts.
- More than 60 magazines with journalistic texts, news, and specialized photography for all tastes.

Databases that provide the possibility to access:

- More than 90 articles on business development for entrepreneurs and researchers.
- More than 10,500 legal documents for daily use in the Colombian legal system.
- More than 180 video courses for online learning about gastronomy and forestry resources.
- More than 45,000 scores of classical music and blues.
- More than 500,000 audio tracks of soundtracks, classical music, jazz, and blues.
- More than 3,500 educational games for children and young people.

Platform with special collections consisting of:

- Books of literature that feature Bogotá as a protagonist, character, or setting.
- Books, sound testimonies, and videos about the memory and history of the localities of Bogotá.
- Books and theoretical and didactic material for teachers, reading and writing mediators of the city.
- Heritage collections with photographs, maps, sound archives, and videos about the history of Colombia.

The Digital Library of Bogotá was designed through a participatory process with public discussions among district institutions, academic communities, and city residents. In it, spaces for discussion were opened through in-person forums, emails, virtual surveys, and a hackathon that led to the construction of its first prototype. From there, a scalable system based on entrepreneurial and innovative practices was designed, which will gradually grow through partnerships and projects with specific topics of citizen interest.

== Programs ==
=== Promotion of Reading, Writing, and Oral skills ===
It is a program that integrates a set of actions and strategies that promote access to written culture and other media, through encounterz with a wide diversity of texts, promoting reading and writing as social and cultural practices that enable access, use, and transformation of information and knowledge, aesthetic appreciation, and the exercise of the symbolic function of language, as well as the exercise of citizenship and social participation.

=== Promotion of culture ===
Ongoing programming of cultural activities such as conferences, exhibitions, workshops, theater, music, film screenings, forums, and seminars.

=== Library outreach ===
Special activities aimed at providing information services and reading promotion programs to communities that do not have easy access to library services or infrastructure.

=== User education ===
A cross-cutting program across the services and programs developed by the library, which includes different strategies, programs, technological literacy, activities, or situations that guide, educate, and / or instruct users in making the most of information resources and information itself.

=== Play centers ===
Spaces for the development of activities that promote learning and knowledge construction through play, recreation, and education for leisure and free time.

== See also ==
- List of libraries in Colombia
