= Commission of Inquiry on Tigray Genocide =

Commission to investigate international crimes in Tigray

- Abbreviation: CITG
- Established: May 2022 (4 years ago)
- Types: government commission
- Aim: criminal investigation
- Country: Ethiopia
- Website: citghub.org

The Commission of Inquiry on Tigray Genocide (CITG; Tigrinya: ኮሚሽን መፅናዕቲ ጀኖሳይድ ትግራይ) is an investigative body created in May 2022 during the Tigray war by the de facto government of Tigray Region to investigate crimes of international law, including genocide, during the Tigray war. CITG continued operations during the Interim Regional Administration of Tigray and was recognised by the federal government of Ethiopia in June 2024.

== Creation and leadership ==
The Commission of Inquiry on Tigray Genocide was established by the de facto government of Tigray Region in May 2022 during the Tigray war. In 2024 the CITG continued its work under the Interim Regional Administration of Tigray. The federal government of Ethiopia did not consider CITG legitimate until June 2024. In June 2024, CITG started working with the (federal Ethiopian) Ministry of Finance and Economic Development and the World Bank.

In June 2024, Yemane Zeray was the head of the CITG.

== Aim ==
CITG describes its mandate as investigating crimes of international law including genocide during the Tigray war in order to support legal proceedings, guide rehabilitation and reconstruction in Tigray, and provide a long-term reference for later study.

== Reports ==
=== Wartime sexual violence ===
On 16 October 2025, CITG published its 166-page report on sexual violence in the Tigray war, "War-Induced Genocidal Sexual and Gender-Based Violence in Tigray, Ethiopia, Volume 1". The CITG interviewed 481,201 women and girls in Tigray, and found that 152,108 people had been raped, including gang rape, and 37,000 people had been sexually enslaved. The total number of survivors of gender-based violence was 286,250; 73% had severe psychological distress.

The report attributed 56% of the sexual and gender-based violence to the Eritrean Defence Forces (EDF), 36% to the Ethiopian National Defense Force (ENDF), 6% to Amhara forces, and 0.07% to Afar forces.

In its October 2025 report, CITG was critical of the federal government's transitional justice policy, arguing that "the national accountability mechanism, including the ongoing national transitional justice, is unlikely to investigate and prosecute the crime of genocide committed against Tigrayan women and girls" and called for international courts or an ad hoc international criminal tribunal to be established. The report also found that the survivors of sexual and gender-based violence "rejected" the federal government's proposed transitional justice process "due to deep mistrust and longstanding impunity".

=== Social sector ===
In October 2025, CITG published a 289-page report, "The Systematic Undoing of Society: War Damage and Loss in the Social Sector of Tigray, Volume 1". The report found nearly total destruction of learning infrastructure, with eighty percent of schools non-functional, with destruction in primary, secondary and higher education including burning, looting and military use of classrooms. The report described the destruction "[a]cross all sectors [education, health, cultural and religious institutions], the level of damage is dominated by complete destruction, followed by high-level damage, where most losses were catastrophic and largely unrecoverable". CITG attributed the destruction primarily to the EDF (education: 44%, health: 56%, social welfare: 11%, cultural and religious infrastructure: 40%) and secondarily to the ENDF (education: 25%, health: 17%, social welfare: 27%, cultural and religious infrastructure: 31–36%) and secondarily to the ENDF). Maternal deaths increased from their pre-war value of 186 per 100,000 live births to 840 per 100,000; immunisation rates dropped from their pre-war value of 100% to 20%. After the war, only 30% of hospitals, 12% of ambulances, and none of 712 "health posts" were still functional.

CITG saw the destruction of the education system as scholasticide, a deliberate mass destruction of educational infrastructure.
