= Scholasticide =

Mass destruction of a place's education infrastructure

Scholasticide, often used interchangeably with the terms educide and epistemicide, refers to the intended mass destruction of education in a specific place. Scholasticide has been used by some to describe the mass destruction in the Iraq War (2003–2011) as well as the Gaza war and Gaza genocide (2023–present).

== Terminology ==
The terms are used interchangeably, covering various forms of the deliberate mass destruction of educational infrastructure. The suffix -cide, Latin for "killing", makes a connection with genocide.

The term scholasticide, where "schola-" is Latin for school, was first used by Karma Nabulsi in January 2009 in relation to the destruction of Palestinian educational infrastructure during the December 2008 to January 2009 Israeli war against Gaza. "Educide" was first used in March 2011 by Hans-Christof von Sponeck, UN Humanitarian Coordinator for Iraq, in a speech concerning Iraq at the Ghent University Conference, with the prefix referring to "education".

== Elements ==
Characteristics that are often mentioned as elements of educide include, but are not necessarily limited to;

- a strategy of intentional and systematic destruction of existing education;
- situations of extreme violence (war, invasion, conflict, genocide, etc.);
- destruction of educational institutions;
- mass killings of academics and students;
- and the destruction of educational materials.

=== Genocide ===
Scholasticide has been linked to genocide. The United Nations (UN) established what constitutes a genocide in Article II of the Convention on the Prevention and Punishment of the Crime of Genocide. Genocide is the intentional killing and destruction of a group, based on their ethnicity, nationality, race, or religion.

== Motives ==
Educide happens intentionally by an aggressor to a certain place and/or people. There are several reasons why an actor decides to commit educide. Motives for educide are for example colonisation. occupation, or annihilition of perceived threats.

When an actor wishes to impose power over a territory, this can go together with displacing or oppressing the native population and giving ruling power to the settlers or occupation forces. This process is often violent as the aggressor tries to suppress uprisings and resistance from the people living there. This suppression can happen via soft power, hard power, or both. Soft power is getting results not by coercion but by attraction, for example via payments, good affiliation, or education. Education plays a crucial role, as it reproduces ideas such as norms, and values of a society; identities and nationalism; and it determines how history is taught. Consequently, it establishes an idea of who is good and who is bad. The coloniser/occupier can use education institutions to control these ideas. It does so by taking over the educational infrastructure. In this process, the original infrastructure is often overruled and/or destroyed. The absence of the original educational infrastructure leads to the colonised/occupied having to mirror and adapt to the infrastructure that is present, that of the coloniser, and is thus (partially) under its influence and control. This can happen via hard power by coercing change and destroying the existing educational infrastructure, which leads to educide.

If an actor perceives a certain group of people form a threat to the actor's stability, security, or power, it could try to weaken or destroy this group of people. In this process, the actor could perceive the educational infrastructure as a danger, since this is where knowledge is developed that serves this group of people. The actor can then decide to destroy the educational infrastructure. For an example, see the case study on Iraq below.

== Impact ==
The destruction of the educational infrastructure of a place has long-term effects on its people. Possible impacts of educide are

1. Inaccessibility to education
2. Educational delays and disadvantages (e.g. higher illiteracy rate)
3. Underemployment: Due to the absence of education, people will not reach their potential in the education they could have achieved, or are not able to receive their diploma. This leads to the possibility of people having work that does not reach their full capabilities and satisfaction in their job.
4. Linguicide: If a certain language is no longer taught, there is a chance for the death of this language because people no longer know how to write or read it, nor develop their oral skills to the full potential.
5. Brain drain: During educide, academics and students can be targeted and thus fled their country, leading to a brain drain as highly educated people leave the country.
6. Ethnic cleansing and/or genocide: The complete removal of educational infrastructure can lead to a loss of collective memory and knowledge reproduction, and thus contribute to ethnic cleansing and/or genocide of a people and its identity.
7. Colonisation: By removing the existing educational infrastructure and replacing it with new infrastructure, a coloniser can control the reproduction of and access to knowledge, which are instrumental in colonising a territory.

== International law ==
Educide is not discussed as a specific crime, such as genocide, in international law. Nevertheless, other elements in international humanitarian law (IHL) try to prevent the crimes committed during educide. IHL established for example the protection of schools and the protection of innocent civilians.

== Cases ==
=== Iraq ===
The term educide was first applied to the situation in Iraq during the 1990s. Before the Gulf War, Iraq had a strong educational infrastructure that was improving. The UN imposed sanctions after the war harmed the country's economy and decreased the quality and accessibility of education. The situation further deteriorated during the Iraq War (2003–2011) and the war against Daesh (2013–2017).

==== Iraq War ====
In March 2003, the United States invaded Iraq as part of the "war on terror", overthrowing the Ba'athist regime of Saddam Hussein. The US incorrectly accused Saddam's regime of possessing weapons of mass destruction and having ties to Al-Qaeda. The invasion has been described by critics as an illegitimate invasion motivated by imperialism. (Note: See also: Rationale for the Iraq War; Legitimacy of the 2003 invasion of Iraq; Opposition to the Iraq War, Protests against the Iraq War; and Legality of the Iraq War) Following the overthrow, the US occupation authorities implemented a process of de-Ba'athification. In addition, an insurgency broke out against the US occupation and new Iraqi government. Moroccan academic Ahmed Kabel has described the US' dismantling of the Iraqi educational system as educide. They replaced it with a system dependent on British and American universities that promoted "Western values," which were criticised as Islamophobic.

The Iraq war led to the destruction of much of the educational infrastructure in Iraq. Between 2003 and 2007, school attendance dropped by almost 70%, at least 280 academics were killed, and 30% of the total number of professors, doctors, and engineers left Iraq. Iraq's educational infrastructure faced many problems with a lack of materials, a fear of bombings and kidnappings preventing students from going to school, and many professors fleeing the country. Many qualified teachers could not perform their professions due to missing their higher education certificates, while others taught despite never having attained the qualifications they claimed to have. The absence of education had a substantial impact on the Iraqi population. In 2011, more than 40% of the Iraqi population is aged 15 years or younger.

==== Daesh ====
Between 2013 and 2017 the educational infrastructure suffered again due to the war against Daesh (also known as "IS", "ISIS", or "ISIL"). According to the Norwegian Council for the Displaced the war led to the Iraqi government reducing or cutting assistance to 5.2 million children. Since 2023, 770,000 children have been displaced. Between 2013 and 2017, in places under Daesh control, the curriculum was changed. Classes such as history or literature were replaced with religious education. The change of curriculum resulted in parents taking their children out of school to prevent indoctrination. Girls were disadvantaged in their access to education, with an adapted curriculum based on gender and having access to education only up up to the age of 15. Girls dropped out due to marrying young, as this could prevent them from being forcefully married to Daesh fighters. Refworld reports that between 2013 and 2017, there were that more than 100 attacks on schools in which 300 people students and staff were injured. Additionally, there were targeted murders, kidnappings, and threats which harmed 60 students and over 100 staff. The UN reported that at least 350 schools were damaged or destroyed in Iraq. In addition, buildings of educational institutions were used for military purposes, such as Mosul University.

=== Tigray ===
During the Tigray war from November 2020 to November 2022, the infrastructure of the primary, secondary and higher education system of Tigray Region in Ethiopia was almost completely destroyed. The Commission of Inquiry on Tigray Genocide (CITG) found eighty percent of schools non-functional after the war, with destruction by burning, looting and military use of classrooms. The destruction was attributed mostly to the Eritrean Defence Forces (44%) and the Ethiopian National Defense Force (25%). CITG viewed the destruction as deliberate.

=== Palestine ===
The terms "educide," "scholasticide," and "epistemicide" have been used to describe Israeli repression of and military attacks on Palestinian educational infrastructure, particularly within the Gaza Strip during the Gaza War. The term scholasticide was first used by Karma Nabulsi in January 2009 in relation to the destruction of Palestinian educational infrastructure during the Gaza War (2008–2009).

After the 2023 October 7 attacks, (Note: For background information, see Blockade of the Gaza Strip and Gaza–Israel conflict) Israel began an intensive bombing and military campaign into Gaza. The resulting conflict is ongoing and has resulted in multiple international legal actions against Israel and Israeli officials for alleged war crimes and crimes against humanity and has resulted in a possible case of genocide in Gaza.

As a result of the war on Gaza, most educational institutions have been destroyed, including 80% of all schools in Gaza. Critics have claimed that Israel systematically and intentionally destroyed all the universities in Gaza. Some of the educational buildings were converted into military bases by Israel. In addition to the material infrastructure, Israel has targeted those connected to the educational infrastructure, such as students and academics. As of April 2024, 5,479 students, 261 teachers, and 95 university professors were killed and 7819 students and 756 teachers injured. The numbers have been increasing ever since. According to the Ministry of Education and Higher Education of Gaza, 625,000 students could not access education as a result of the conflict. Scholars Against the War on Palestine (SAWP), a coalition of academics and scholars against the war and possible scholatide, have listed acts composing scholasticide which have occurred in Gaza.

=== Iran ===
During the 2026 Iran war, more than twenty universities came under attack. That includes nearly all of the major universities in Tehran. Technical universities were hit especially hard—lecture halls, labs, libraries, data centers, and other buildings were damaged. Sharif University of Technology, often called the "MIT of Iran", was also struck. Iran's Red Crescent Society says at least 600 educational sites have been damaged or completely destroyed. According to some experts, the focus on technical universities may be tied to their role in the Iranian economy. Iranian universities tend to rank well in global standings, especially in science and engineering. These technical universities support key industries like oil and steel—industries that help Iran function independently. Attacking these universities could damage Iran's economy.

== See also ==
- Cultural genocide

== Bibliography ==
- Glück, Zoltán (26 April 2024). "Introduction – Anthropology and the security encounter: Toward an abolitionist anthropology in the age of permanent war" (PDF). American Anthropologist. doi:10.1111/aman.13977. ISSN 0002-7294.
- Suslovic, Brianna; Rasmussen, Cameron; Kim, Mimi; Sarantakos, Sophia; Dettlaff, Alan; Roe, Christina; Guevara, Vivianne (17 June 2024). "Speaking Against Silence: Examining Social Work's Response to Genocide". Abolitionist Perspectives in Social Work. 2 (1). doi:10.52713/5sehsp64. ISSN 2832-1154.
- Alousi, Rula (10 August 2022). "Educide: The Genocide of Education. A case study on the impact of invasion, and conflict on education" (PDF). The Business and Management Review. 13 (2). Centre for Business and Economic Research: 331–335. doi:10.24052/BMR/V13NU02/ART-28. ISSN 2047-2862.
- Wind, Maya (2024). Towers of Ivory and Steel: How Israeli Universities Deny Palestinian Freedom. Verso. ISBN 978-1-80429-176-4.
