= Aksumite Congress Party =

Aksumite Congress Party ውድብ አክሱማይ ዋዕላ
- Abbreviation: ACP
- Founder: Solomon Barnabas
- Founded: May 2023

The Aksumite Congress Party (ACP) (Tigrinya: ውድብ አክሱማይ ዋዕላ) is an opposition party in the Tigray Region of Ethiopia.

== Creation ==
The Aksumite Congress Party was established in May 2023 and officially registered with the National Election Board of Ethiopia (NEBE). Solomon Barnabas is one of the founding members and the party's coordinator.

== Name ==
Dimtsi Weyane insights that ACP aims to address the region's challenges through a new approach to governance. Its name, invoking the historical Aksumite Empire, a major power in the region from the 1st to 7th centuries AD, signifies a connection to Tigray's glorious past, evoking national pride and identity while suggesting aspirations for a strong and prosperous future, echoing Aksum's historical prominence. Led by Solomon Barnabas, and political affairs head Abreha Woldemariam, the Aksumite Congress seeks to be a new political force bringing positive change to Tigray.

== Policies ==
At its creation in May 2023, the party leaders stated that the laws currently in place in Tigray are used to govern the people rather than governing through law. They aim to rectify this by establishing a system that prioritizes the rule of law and safeguards the rights and dignity of the Tigrayan people. Barnabas stressed that securing Tigray's territorial integrity is a critical mission for the party. He also highlighted the importance of implementing the Pretoria agreement. He warned that failure to do so would pose a significant threat to peace and stability in the Horn of Africa.

== 2025 Tigray Interim Council ==
The ACP is among the other political parties that participated in the establishment of a historic Interim council that will oversee the Interim Regional Administration of Tigray, with three permanent seats on the council.
