= Tigray Democratic Party =

Tigray Democratic Party ትግራይ ዴሞክራሲያዊ ፓርቲ
- Abbreviation: TDP (ትዴፓ)
- Chairperson: Aregawi Berhe (2020)
- Founded: 1995
- Registered: 7–8 December 2019
- National affiliation: Tigrean Alliance for National Dialogue (1995)

The Tigray Democratic Party (Tigrinya: ትግራይ ዴሞክራሲያዊ ፓርቲ, TDP) is an opposition party in the Tigray Region of Ethiopia.

== Creation ==
The Tigray Democratic party (TDP) describes its origin as an expatriate group in 1995, that shifted to Ethiopia in 2018 and held its first organising conference under Ethiopian law for party registration during 7–8 December 2019. A related group formerly known as Tigrean Alliance for National Dialogue (TAND) was created in March 1995 in Washington DC, USA by former members of the Tigray People's Liberation Front (TPLF), including Aregawi Berhe (a former TPLF military commander), Ghidey Zer'atsion (former TPLF Deputy Chairman) and Mekonen Zelelew (veteran fighter).

== Leadership and structure ==
As of November 2020, Aregawi Berhe, a former co-founder of the Tigray People's Liberation Front (TPLF), is the chair of the TDP. Senior leaders in January 2019 included Ghidey Zer'aTsion, a former co-founder and deputy chairman of TPLF, Mulubirhan Haile and Gidena Medhin who left TDP in June 2022.

As of 2019, the leadership structure of the TDP included a Central Committee of 12 members, among which five form the executive committee; and a 3-member Audit and Control Committee.

== Membership ==
The party has few members.

== Positions ==
=== 2020 Tigray election and conflict ===
In July 2020, the TDP announced that it would boycott the 2020 Tigray regional election.

In November 2020, the TDP criticised the 4 November 2020 Northern Command attacks by TPLF security forces against the federal Ethiopian Northern Command bases and headquarters in the Tigray Region, describing the attacks as treasonous. TDP chair Aregawi Berhe described the TPLF as seeking wealth and power and uninterested in ordinary Tigrayans' interests.

In early December 2020, TDP chair Aregawi Berhe called for political parties in Tigray to cooperate and for civil society organisations to be developed. Aregawi, speaking on behalf of the TDP, declared the TDP's support for the federal security forces' role in the 2020 Tigray conflict, complemented Abiy Ahmed for a 14 December report to the House of Peoples' Representatives (HoPR) on the conflict, and criticised the "atrocities and oppression" of the TPLF "against the people of Tigray". Aregawi stated that the TDP aimed to promote the building of a democratic system and called for people to organise "under civic associations, parties and organisations" and for "mothers in Tigray Region to stop their children from going to war". He stated that the TDP would support a "free, fair and democratic election" in Tigray Region.

== Repression ==
In January 2019, Mulubirhan Haile and Gidana Medhin of the TDP claimed that it was being repressed, was the victim of hate speech, and was blocked from holding meetings for communicating with the wider public. They accused the TPLF of "false propaganda".
