= Assimba Democratic Party =

Assimba Democratic Party ዓሲምባ ዴሞክራሲያዊ ፖርቲ
- Abbreviation: ADP
- Founder: Asgedom
- Founded: October 2019
- Ideology: Social democracy Irob interests

The Assimba Democratic Party (Tigrinya: ዓሲምባ ዴሞክራሲያዊ ፖርቲ, ADP) is an opposition party in the Tigray Region of Ethiopia.

== Creation ==
The Assimba Democratic Party was created in October 2019 and officially registered with the National Election Board of Ethiopia (NEBE). Asgedom was one of the founding members.

== Name ==
Borkena suggested that the name Assimba represents nostalgia for the location in the Tigray Region of a former military training ground used in the late 1970s by the Ethiopian People's Revolutionary Party.

== Policies ==
At its creation in October 2019, Asgedom stated that the status of the Eritrean–Ethiopian border, negotiated in the Algiers Agreement in 2000, was a concern for the Assimba Democratic Party and that the status of Welkait and Raya Azebo was also a priority.

The ADP stated that it supports "good governance, equity in infrastructure development, broadening the political space in Tigray, improving the quality of education and fighting unemployment". The ADP described itself as social democratic in contrast to the "revolutionary democracy" of the Tigray People's Liberation Front (TPLF).

Ethiopia Insight describes the ADP as mainly based in the Irob woreda and representing the interests of the Irob people who mostly live in disputed Eritrean–Ethiopian border areas.

== 2020 Tigray regional election ==
The ADP participated in the 2020 Tigray regional election in which the TPLF won all 152 contested seats. In a September decision by the Tigrayan Regional Council, opposition parties were allotted sixteen seats, in order to provide a voice for the opposition against the 190 seats held by the TPLF. The ADP received one of the newly created seats.
