= Tunal library =

Library in Bogotá, Colombia

Coordinates: 4.5721°N 74.1300°W

Public Library El Tunal Gabriel García Márquez
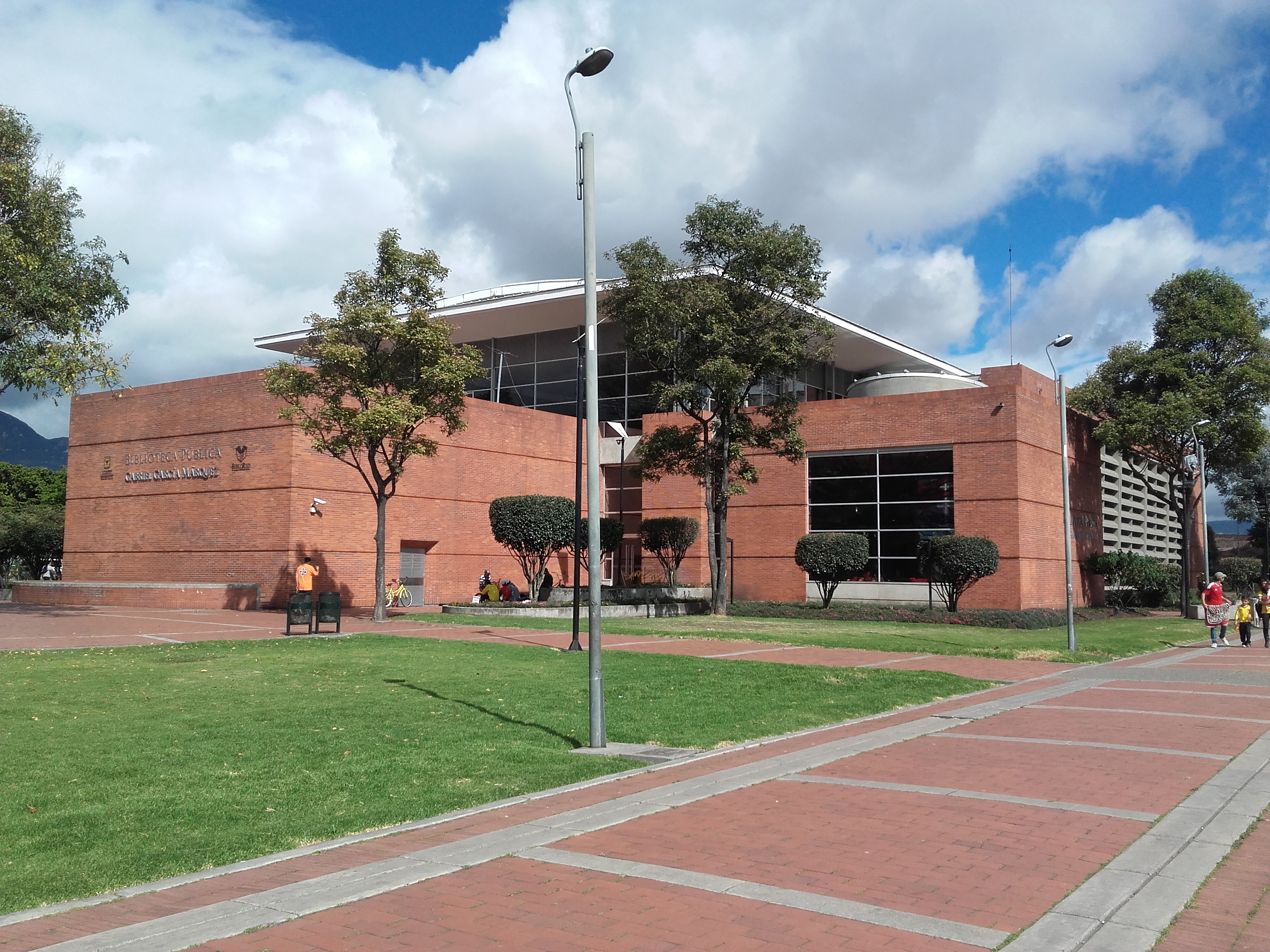
- Type: Public
- Established: May 10, 2001
- Architects: Suely Vargas Nóbrega; Manuel Antonio Guerrero; Marcia Wanderley

Collection
- Size: 84,000

Other information
- Website: https://www.biblored.gov.co/bibliotecas/biblioteca-gabriel-garcia-marquez

The Gabriel García Márquez - El Tunal Public Library, is a library located in the Tunal Park in the south of Bogotá, Colombia. It was designed by architects Suely Vargas Nóbrega, Manuel Antonio Guerrero and Marcia Wanderley and was inaugurated on May 10, 2001, forming part of the BibloRed Network of Public Libraries, and receives approximately 4,000 people of different ages daily.

On June 18, 2014, by means of Agreement #556 (articles three) of the Bogotá City Council, the Library was renamed as the Gabriel García Márquez - El Tunal Public Library, to honor the Colombian writer and Nobel Prize winner.

== General information ==
The library has an area of 6.826 m^{2} and a capacity for 110,000 volumes. It is a three-story structure with different specialised rooms. The reference room, the literature room and the main one are located in the central part. Inside the main room, is the video library and the sound library, where documentaries can be watched and music can be listened to, respectively.

The different rooms have reading tables, electronic catalogs, and a newspaper library. The library also has rooms for group work, computer rooms for Internet accessing, multimedia, and training.

The children's area, the Bogotá Room, the auditorium, an Internet room and a coffee shop are located in the side rooms. The children's area consists of a reading room, computers, a playroom, and patios for outdoor activities. The Bogotá room is a specialised room with information about the city, sponsored by the Bogotá Chamber of Commerce. Next to its main entrance, we find a sculpture of Gandhi.

The cultural extension area consists of an auditorium for 250 people, modular conference rooms with a capacity for up to 150 people.

== Access ==
Through the Villavicencio City Avenue and the Transmilenio station called "Biblioteca", located on said avenue. Additionally, through 48 B South Street, and the Public Transportation System

== See also ==
- List of libraries in Colombia
