= Addis Fortune =

Private and independent newspaper based in Addis Ababa, Ethiopia

- Format: Broadsheet
- Owner: Independent News & Media Plc
- Headquarters: Addis Ababa, Ethiopia
- Country: Ethiopia
- Website: addisfortune.news

Addis Fortune (also known as Fortune) is a private and independent newspaper based in Addis Ababa, Ethiopia.

== Overview ==
It is the largest English-language weekly in the country. Its circulation is often quoted at a meager 7,500 copies per week in a country with a population of 100 million. However, its rival, Capital, which is also based in Addis Ababa, recently claimed to have topped Fortune in circulation in a project launched to celebrate its ten-year anniversary. Fortune still claims to be the largest circulating paper in its category, surpassing all others in the competition by an average of 60%.

== History ==
The newspaper was first issued in the year 2000. Making it the 14th or 15th newspaper to be issued in Ethiopia.
