= Virgilio Barco Library =

Public library in Bogotá, Colombia

Virgilio Barco Public Library
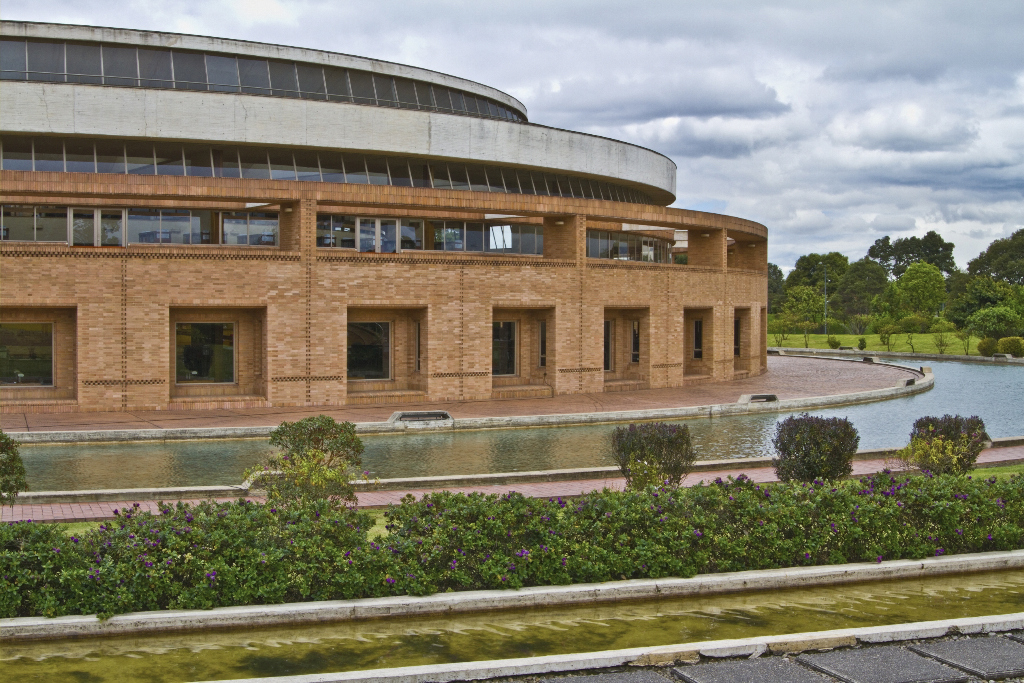
- 4.6571°N 74.0885°W
- Location: Colombia
- Type: public
- Architect: Rogelio Salmona
- Service area: 36.812 m²

Collection
- Size: 150.000 items

Virgilio Barco Public Library is a Public library in the western sector of Bogotá, Colombia. It is a part of BibloRed, the District's Public Library Network. The building was designed by architect Rogelio Salmona, and forms part of the Simón Bolívar Metropolitan Park. Its inauguration took place on 21 December 2001, named after former President Virgilio Barco Vargas.

The design of the building is notable for its emphasis of water management, with water pools on the outside. The library and its surrounding park together form one of seven sites which make up the serial property "The architectural legacy of Rogelio Salmona: an ethical, political, social and poetic manifesto." Colombia's permanent delegation to UNESCO submitted the site to the country's Tentative List for the World Heritage List in 2022.

== Architecture ==
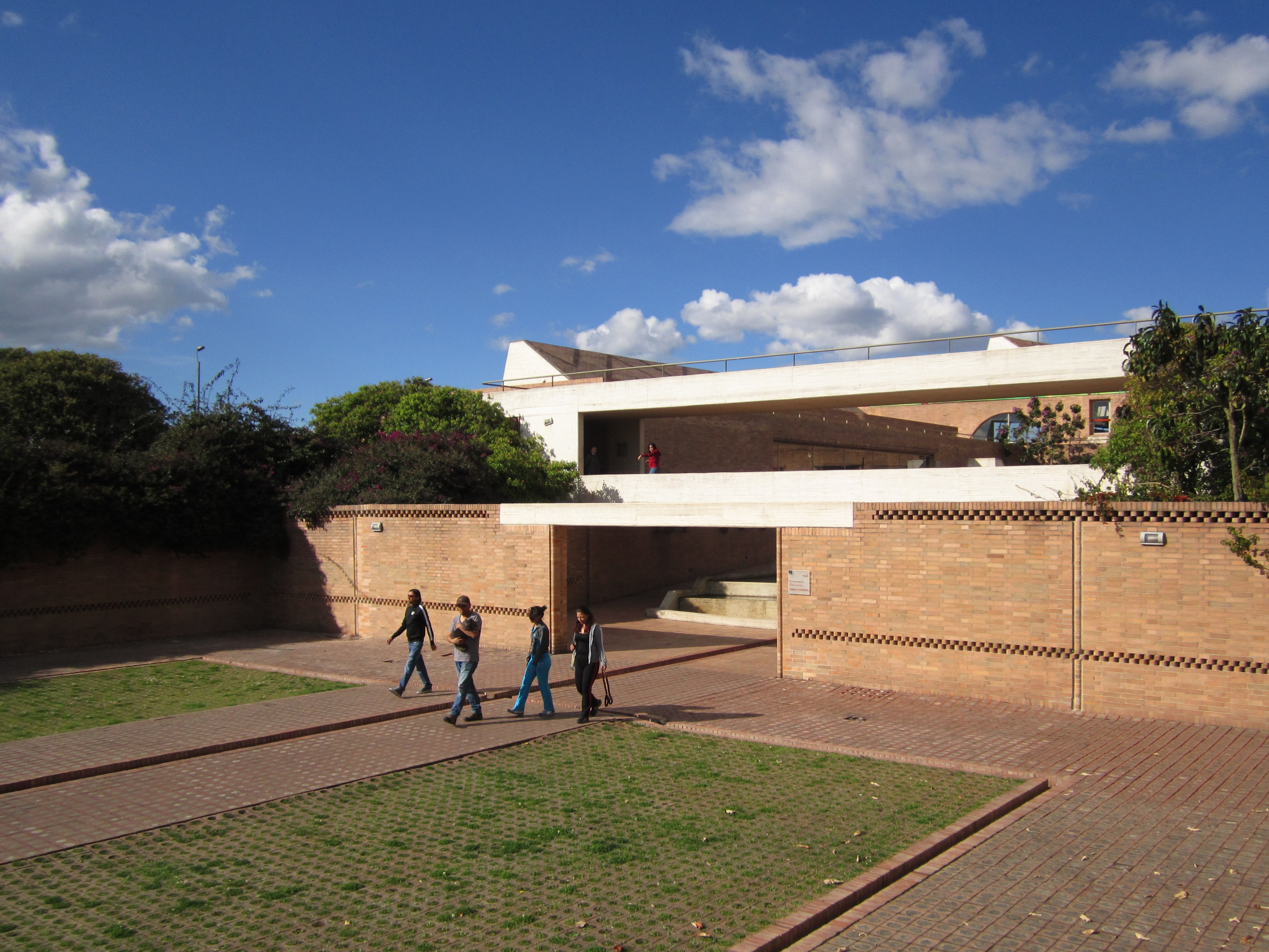
Library entrance

The library building was designed by Rogelio Salmona, also known for the Torres del Parque, the National Archive building, Gabriel García Márquez's house in Cartagena, the National University's Postgraduate Building in Social Sciences, among others.

For the construction of the library, Salmona took into account its interrelation with the public space, forming a series of geographical, landscape, historical, and experiential values.

== See also ==
- List of libraries in Colombia
