= Tigray Defense Forces =

Tigrayan paramilitary force in Ethiopia

- ሓይልታት ምክልኻል ትግራይ ሰራዊት ትግራይ
- Founded: 4 November 2020; 5 years ago
- Type: Paramilitary
- Size: 250,000–270,000
- Part of: TPLF
- Garrison/HQ: Mekelle, Tigray Region
- Mottos: ዘይንድይቦ ጎቦ; There are no mountains we would not climb
- Engagements: Ethiopian civil conflict (2018–present); Tigray War; Tigray clashes (January-February 2026); 2026 Ethiopian offensive; Sudanese civil war (2023–present)

Commanders
- President: Debretsion Gebremichael
- Commander-in-chief: Lieutenant Gen Tadesse Werede Tesfay
- Member of central command: Lieutenant General Tsadkan Gebretensae
- Spokesperson: Colonel Gebre Gebretsadik

The Tigray Defense Forces (TDF; Tigrinya: ሓይልታት ምክልኻል ትግራይ), colloquially called the Tigray Army (ሰራዊት ትግራይ), is a paramilitary organization located in the Tigray region of Ethiopia. It was founded by former generals of the Ethiopian military in 2020 to combat federal forces enforcing national government mandates in the Tigray region, culminating in the outbreak of the Tigray War that same year. Despite its conventional structure, the TDF has also utilized the use of asymmetrical warfare.

Human rights groups including Amnesty International and Human Rights Watch have reported that the TDF has committed war crimes against civilians including gang rape and extrajudicial killings during their offensives and occupation of both the Afar and Amhara regions during the Tigray War. According to the Ethiopian Ministry of Justice, TDF combatants were found liable for upwards of 540 civilians casualties as of 28 December 2021.

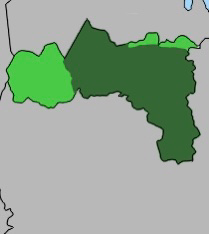
Territory controlled by the Tigray Defense Forces (dark green), inside of the Tigray Region (light green), as of 13 October 2022

== Overview ==
The Tigray Defense Forces consist of former members of the gendarmerie Regional Special Forces in the Tigray Region, Ethiopian Army defectors, local militia, members of Tigrayan regional political parties including the TPLF, National Congress of Great Tigray, Salsay Weyane Tigray, Tigray Independence Party and others, as well as numerous youth who fled to the mountains.

The Tigrayan leadership, though driven from power in Mekelle, the region's capital, has rallied under the banner of the Tigray Defence Forces, an armed resistance group. It is led by the removed Tigrayan leaders and commanded by former high-ranking Ethiopian National Defence Force officers. — International Crisis Group, Ethiopia's Tigray War: A Deadly, Dangerous Stalemate,

Internally, analysts believe that the relative influence of the TPLF has been weakened to the benefit of newer elements within the TDF.

=== Leadership ===
Many TDF officers and non-commissioned officers defected from the ENDF in the lead up to and during the Tigray War. In a Zoom meeting with Tigray diaspora activists in June 2021, President of the Tigray region, Debretsion Gebremichael, stated that the TDF is led by a central command which coordinates their military actions.

Lieutenant General Tsadkan Gebretensae, who was the chief of staff of Ethiopian National Defense Forces until 2001, became the TDF commander in chief and remained in that post until March 2021, when he became a member of the Central Command.

Lieutenant General Tadesse Werede Tesfay is part of the command and Commander-in-Chief of the TDF since March 2021.

Brigadier General Migbey Haile is Commander of the Army.

Brigadier General Abraha Tesfay is Commander of Army.

=== Transition from regular to guerrilla force ===
The Tigray Region Special Forces, which contributed a lot of the members of the TDF, were well supplied with heavy weapons prior to the war and in the war's first phases. Since the TDF expected the ENDF and the Ethiopian Air Force to destroy the heavy weapons, the TDF mostly abandoned the weapons and reorganised the TDF personnel into lightly armed, small mobile groups of ten to eighty fighters each. The heavy weapons were mostly destroyed by the federal forces.

=== Recruitment and strategy ===
According to the Jamestown Foundation; "Young men and women—many of whom fear being raped or murdered—are fleeing to areas under the nominal control of the TDF. The TDF is also accused of carrying out attacks on Amhara civilians."

Members of Tigrayan civil society have also joined the TDF, including Kindeya Gebrehiwot, a former president of Mekelle University; Desta Gebremedhin, a former journalist of BBC World, popular musicians, and Mulugeta Gebrehiwot, a peace researcher.

The TDF has been accused of forced recruitment, including the usage of child soldiers. According to Tigrayan administrative officials, each household in Tigray was required to enlist one member in the TDF, and those who refused detained and jailed, including the parents of children who refused enlistment. As well as forced recruitment and enlistment quotas, the Jamestown Foundation has said, "The Ethiopian government's scorched earth strategy in Tigray has all but ensured the alienation of most Tigrayans. It has also ensured that the TDF will have no shortage of committed fighters and sympathetic supporters within Tigray." and that, "After the ENDF and soldiers from the Eritrean Army took over Tigray’s major towns, TDF forces retreated to strongholds in the mountainous central interior of the region. There, the TDF consolidated forces and re-organized for a transition to guerrilla-style combat... Following what was a strategic retreat to the rugged interior, TDF forces re-organized into small, highly-mobile, lightly armed, detachments of ten to eighty fighters. These detachments were then further divided into mission-specific units."

== War crimes ==
The TDF have been implicated in numerous war crimes in Afar and Amhara Regions to include the extrajudicial killings of civilians, indiscriminate shelling and shooting, rape as a weapon of war, use of civilians as human shields, and widespread looting and destruction of civilian infrastructure and private property. A mid-August 2021 attack by TPLF fighters included gang rape, looting and physical assaults. Tigrayan forces killed 120 civilians in a village on 1 and 2 September 2021. Overall, from 31 August to 9 September 2021, the TDF summarily executed 26 civilians in two towns. In a 110-page report published on 11 March 2022, the Ethiopian Human Rights Commission found that from September to December 2021, 346 civilians had been summarily executed in the Afar and Amhara Regions, mainly by the TDF, and partly by the Oromo Liberation Army (OLA), ENDF, Amhara Special Forces and Fano.

Several international news organizations reported that the TDF razed a village near Kobbo, North Wollo These reports show satellite imagery of the village before and after being burned.
