= Oral skills =

Oral skills are speech enhancers that are used to produce clear sentences that are intelligible to an audience. Oral skills are used to enhance the clarity of speech for effective communication. Communication is the transmission of messages and the correct interpretation of information between people. The production speech is insisted by the respiration of air from the lungs that initiates the vibrations in the vocal cords. The cartilages in the larynx adjust the shape, position and tension of the vocal cords. Speech enhancers are used to improve the clarity and pronunciation of speech for correct interpretation of speech. The articulation of voice enhances the resonance of speech and enables people to speak intelligibly. Speaking at a moderate pace and using clear pronunciation improves the phonation of sounds. The term "phonation" means the process to produce intelligible sounds for the correct interpretation of speech. Speaking in a moderate tone enables the audience to process the information word for word.

== Speech production ==
Speech is produced from the vibrations in the vocal cords. The lungs, vocal cords and larynx play an important role in speech production. The lungs draws in air to produce vibrations in the vocal cords. The movement and shape of the vocal fords determines the pitch of sounds. The larynx consists of nine cartilages that assists the vocal cords to produce sound. Producing clear speech is important for effective communication.

=== Lungs ===
The lungs pump air to the vocal folds initiating air pressure. This creates vibrations in the vocal cords to produce sound. During breathing and speaking, air is exhaled out of the lungs. The pressure of the air opens the vocal cords. The expanding of the diaphragm and the intercostal muscles builds high pressure in the thoracic cavity. This causes unbalanced air pressure between the inside and the outside of the body. Thus, the air pressure reaches equilibrium when the air is exhaled.

=== Vocal cords ===
Vibrations in the vocal cords is achieved by the accelerated movements of the opening and closing of the glottis. Sound is produced from this movement as air is expired from the lungs. The size of the opening of the glottis can determine the pitch of sounds. A larger opening of the glottis produces a low pitch tone and a smaller opening of the glottis produces a high pitch tone. The contraction and relaxation of the vocal cords also impacts the pitch of sound. The length and the force of the vocal cords impacts the vibrations of the vocal cords. The longer and relaxed the vocal cord are, the slower they vibrate and in turn produces a lower pitch sound.

=== Larynx ===
The larynx (voice box) is located in the throat. The larynx produces an open airway when breathing and a mechanism for sound production. The larynx is contains the vocal cords and nine cartilages (gristle) that are connected by membranes and ligaments. The large cartilage ring (thyroid cartilage) is located at the upper part of the larynx. The large cartilage is composed of two bands that forms an Adams Apple. The cricoid cartilage is located below the cartilage and it is attached to the trachea. Six thinner cartilages form part of the lateral and posterior walls of the larynx. The arytenoid cartilages are vital for sound production as the arytenoid cartilages anchor the vocal cords. The muscles in the cartilage adjust the shape, position and tension of the vocal cords. The interior of the larynx has a mucus-coated lining. The layer of cilia on the mucus lining enables the vocal cords to push out foreign substances such as dust mites and mucus particles out of the larynx. Clearing the throat of foreign particles helps to produces crisp and clear sound that is intelligible and effective for communication. The vocal ligaments are buried under the mucus lining of cilia. The vocal ligaments are attached to cartilages and the mucus lining is folded to form the vocal folds. From a bird's eye view, both sides of the vocal folds produces a ‘V’ shape. The vocal folds vibrates in a ‘V’ shape and produces sounds when air passes between the lungs and the glottis. The vestibular cords are mucosal folds that sit above the vocal cords. The mucus produced by the vestibular cords assists in lubricating the vocal cords and prevents any food or liquid entering the breathing passages.

== Clarity in speaking ==
Clarity in speaking is achieved by utilising oral skills. Oral skills strengthen a speakers ability to produce clear and crisp sounds. Using a variety of different oral skills the tonal modulation and articulation of voice. These oral skills include speaking in a moderate pace to produce intelligible speech that can be understood word for word. Having a clear pronunciation of words enhances the diction of speech.

=== Articulation ===
The human mouth utilises the lips, tongue and jaws for articulation. The articulation of vowels and phrases produces clear speech that is intelligible. The resonance of speech is produced by the pharynx and some sinuses of the cranium. These sinuses contain air-filled cavities that are lined with mucous membranes. Any blockage of theses cavities such as a cold, blocked nose or a sore throat can affect the quality of speech as not enough air is being released from these cavities. The volume of sound is determined by the intensity of the airflow. A greater force of airflow produces a louder sound as there are more vibrations. A louder voice can improve the intelligibility of speech when speaking to a larger audience. Speakers alter their articulation and their volume when speaking in different environments in order for others to understand them.

=== Moderate pace ===
A moderate pace of speech enables a person to speak intelligibly. The moderate pace in speech enables a listener to process and understand the information. This helps to break down large and complex information to smaller parts. Pausing during speaking emphasises the information and this enables the audience to interpret the information correctly. Speaking at approximately 120-150 words per minute (wpm) is a moderate pace for an audience to comprehend information. A varying speaking rate can engage the interest and attention of the audience. A fast tempo creates a mood of tension and swiftness. The message conveyed to the audience can be interpreted as an urgent or a light-hearted message. A slow tempo is used to convey complex and crucial information as the audience needs more time to process the ideas and information.

=== Pronunciation ===
The correct pronunciation of vowels is aided by the soft plate, tongue, lips and cheeks. These structures aid to ‘shape’ sound into vowels and consonants. The correct pronunciation of words enables the listener to correctly interpret the information. The movement of the mouth and lips affects the pronunciation words. The tongue plays a key role in the pronunciation of vowels and consonants. The tongue moves in several different positions to correctly produce these sounds. The tip of the tongue moves towards the top of the gum ridge to produce words starting with the letter ‘L’. The tongue will push back away from the teeth to produce words starting with letter ‘R’. Words are pronounced by syllables. This breaks down words into smaller parts which enables the audience to comprehend the word. Syllables can also be emphasised to clearly pronounce words correctly. To pronounce a noun that is two-syllables long, the first syllable is emphasised. To pronounce a verb that is two-syllables long, the second syllable is emphasised. Stressing on important words in sentences can emphasise the meaning and clarity of sentences.

=== Tone ===
The tone of voice in speaking is modulated to convey expression and emotion. This enables the responder to recognise emotion that is appropriate of the circumstance and this enables the audience to process information immediately and correctly. The pitch of one's voice can impact the clarity of speech. A monotonous tone of voice can cause the listener to misinterpret information as it is harder to focus to a monotonous tone. A verbose tone of voice highlights technical language that is inwardly focused. A verbose tone of voice is used to convey factual information. An informal tone is used to express non-technical information. Inflections in speech is the variation of rise and fall of the volume of tone. Inflection in speech is vital for intonation for intelligible speaking. Intonation of the voice engages the attention and concentration of the listener. Inflections in speech can impact the relative importance of information. Breathing plays an important role in the production of inflections in speech. Diaphragmatic breathing controls the amount of air the body inhales and exhales and influences the rise and fall of the volume of tone.

=== Verbal fillers ===
Verbal fillers are commonly used when a speaker recalls or is confused by what they are saying. "Um", "Err" and "Hmm", are commonly used verbal fillers. The repetition of phrases in sentences is a verbal filler. that These unintentional pauses can affect the clarity of speech as it creates gaps in the speaker's sentences. Verbal fillers can disrupt the flow of speech and can distract the attention of the audience. This can impact the audience understanding and ability to process information. A pause in a sentence is effective to use than verbal fillers as it does not distract the audience with an unprecedented gap in the information. Pauses enables the audience to reflect on key ideas that has been spoken about. Mumbling and not opening the mouth wide enough when speaking can produce unclear speech that is not intelligible.

== Speech Perception ==

The human ears detect vibrations from sounds and converts this information to the brain via nerve impulses. These vibrations are transferred to specialised parts of the ears. The external, middle and inner ear play an important role in the transformation of sound and energy. The techniques used in oral skills to produce clear speech impacts the correct interpretation of information.

=== External ear ===
The external ear (outer ear) consists of the pinnae and meatus and the outer layer of the eardrum (tympanic membrane). The pinnae helps to restrict sound waves entering the ears. Sound from the external environment is transmitted as a wave in the auditory canal (meatus). This is then transmitted to the tympanic membrane (eardrum). The sound waves sets up vibrations in the tympanic membrane. The pars tensa is an active vibrating area that responds to sound waves. The tympanic membrane regularly grows and can automatically self-repair after injury.

=== Middle ear ===
The middle ear is a cavity that is filled with air. The tympanic membrane separates the middle ear from the external ear. The middle ear is joined to the throat via the Eustachian tube. The Eustachian tube adjusts the air pressure around the sides of the tympanic membrane by drawing in air from the mouth. The sound in the tympanic membrane is converted into vibrations (kinetic energy) via the three interconnecting ear ossicles to the oval window of the inner ear. The middle ear is connected to the perilymph (fluid) of the inner ear via the oval window. The oval window has the ability to hold fluid in the cochlea.

=== Inner ear ===
The inner ear is composed of bony canals (bony labyrinth). It is divided into three parts: vestibule, semicircular canals and the cochlea. These vestibule and the semicircular parts play a key role in the sensors for balancing. The cochlea plays an important part in hearing. Vibrations from the oval window of the inner ear is transferred to the perilymph in the upper canal via a pressure wave. The Reissner's membrane transfers the vibrations to the endolymph of the middle canal. The Basilar membrane then vibrates and triggers the hair cells of the organ of Corti. The kinetic energy is converted to electrochemical energy as the auditory nerve transmits the information to the brain where sound is interpreted.

== See also ==
- Public speaking
