= Salsay Weyane Tigray =

Tigrayan nationalist political party in Ethiopia

- Abbreviation: SAWET
- Chairperson: Kinfe Hadush Belay
- Founded: September 2020
- Ideology: Social democracy
- National affiliation: Baytona; TIP
- Tigray Regional Council: 2 / 190

Website
- WWW.sawet.org

Salsay Weyane Tigray (Tigrinya: ሳልሳይ ወያነ ትግራይ, SAWET) is a political party in the Tigray Region of Ethiopia.

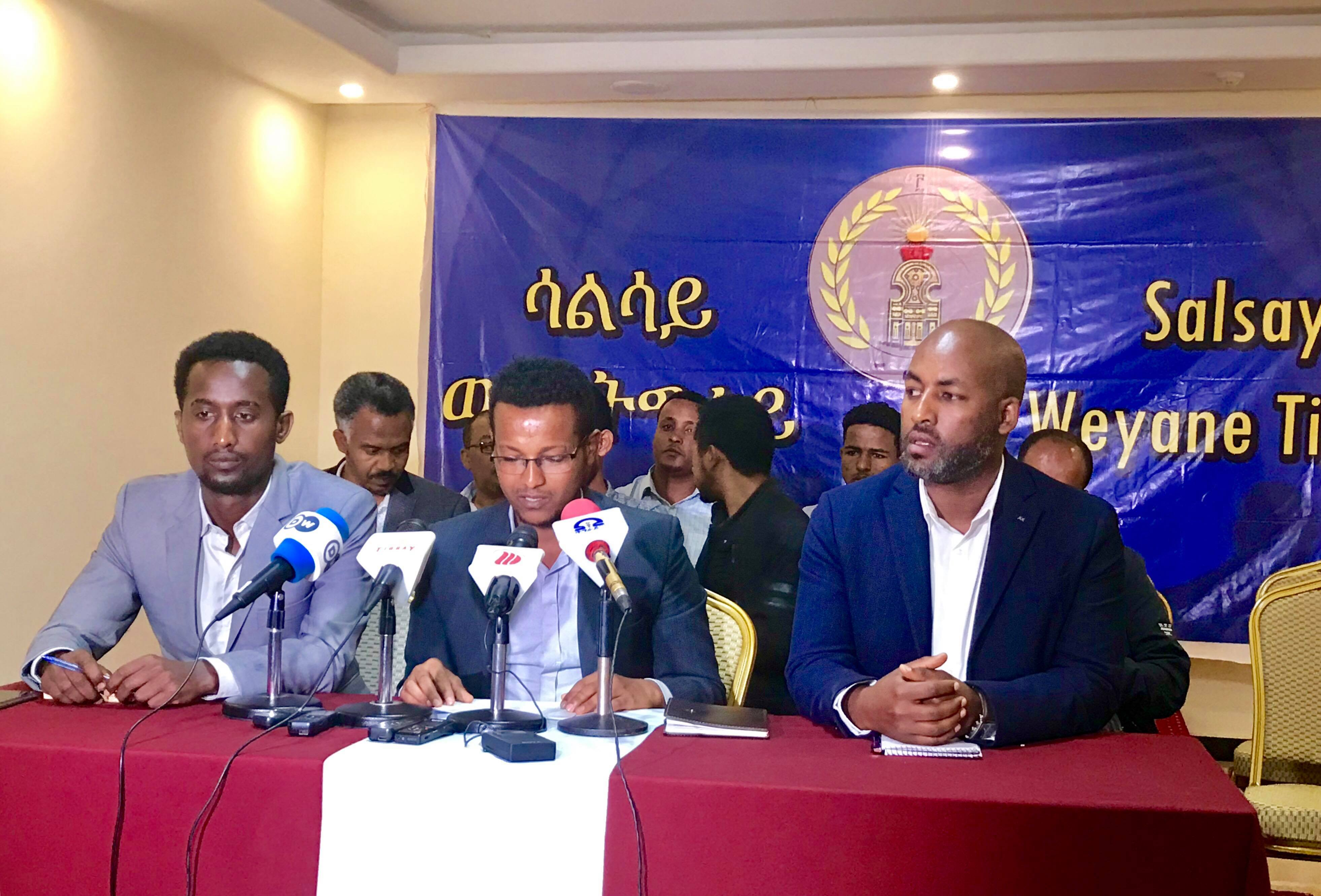
Executive committee members of Salsay Weyane Tigray (7 January 2020). From left to right, first row, Hayalu Godifay (Chairperson Jan 2020-Dec 2023), Kinfe Hadush (Chairperson, since Nov 2025), Alula Hailu (Chairperson Dec 2023- Nov 2025); second row: Ablelom Meles, Kahsay Hailu (hidden), Weldegiorgis Teklay, Hailu Kebede (largely hidden); third row: Tesfakiros Sahle, Tesfalem Berhe ( hidden) ) and Kiros Haileslasie (Political Affairs head)

== Policies ==
Tigray

In January 2021, SAWET's political programme was outlined as follows:

- Establishment of a free and democratic Tigray nation through a peacefull and legal way
- Protection of Tigray's territorial integrity
- Sustainable development, justice and democracy
- To sustain, protect, advance Tigrayan national identity
- Social justice and sustainable economic development
- Building happy, healthy, prosperous and modern population
- Brotherhood and Peace with Eritrea and Tigray people

In September 2020, prior to the 2020 Tigray regional election held that month, SAWET aimed at increased autonomy for Tigray Region, to "secure its territorial integrity, promote its language, and preserve its heritage."

== September 2020 election ==
SAWET won 7,136 votes out of the 2,633,848 votes cast, winning no seats in the September 2020 election. The Tigray Regional Council resulting from the election established a mechanism for minority parties to propose agendas and bills, present motions, propose policy and nominate appointees. SAWET criticised the mechanism as insufficient to "bring about the desired outcome for a vibrant democratic process". SAWET was allotted two seats on the council which it rejected out of principle.

== Tigray War ==
In January 2021, during the Tigray War, the National Election Board of Ethiopia (NEBE) asked SAWET for an "explanation about [its] activities" before taking a possible decision on deregistering the party in relation to its participation in the September 2020 Tigray election, that NEBE considered illegal.

On 2 February 2021, SAWET, together with National Congress of Great Tigray and Tigray Independence Party, estimated there to have been 52,000 civilian casualties of the Tigray War.

== Leadership ==
Kinfe Hadush Belay is founding Member and chairperson of Salsay Weyane Tigray.{{Citati on needed|date=March 2024}}

Gebretnsae Weldemichael is vice-chairman.

Hailu Kebede, foreign affairs head, was arrested in Addis Ababa by the Ethiopian authorities in August 2021.
