= 2020 Tigray regional election =

September 2020 state council election in the Tigray Region, Ethiopia

- 9 September 2020

152 of the 190 seats in the Council of Tigray Regional State' Representatives 96 seats needed for a majority
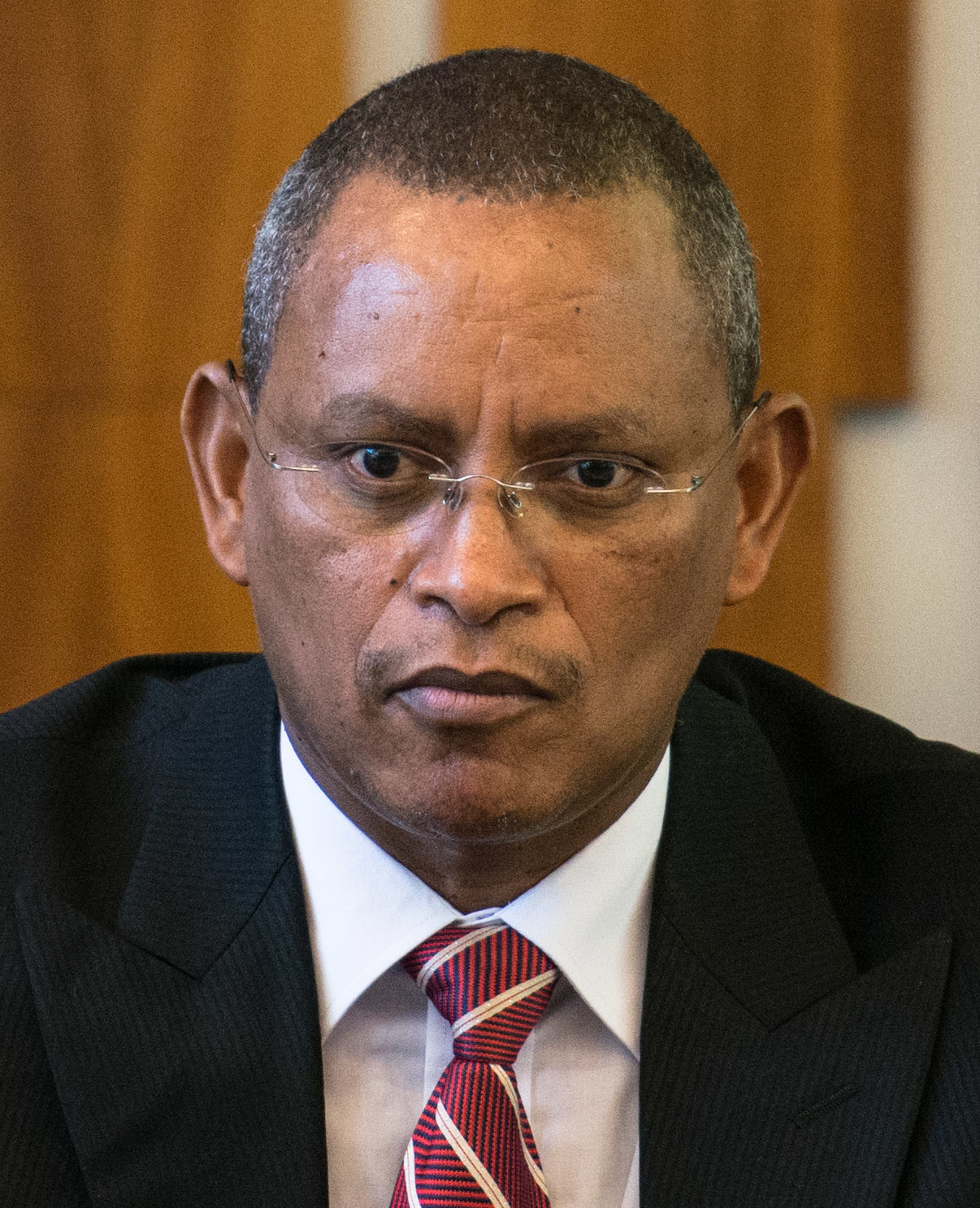
	Majority party
Leader	Debretsion Gebremichael
Party	TPLF
Leader since	2018
Last election	N/A
Seats before	152
Seats won	152
Seats after	152
Seat change	0
Popular vote	2,590,620
Percentage	98.2%
Chief Administrator before election
Debretsion Gebremichael
TPLF
Chief Administrator-designate
Debretsion Gebremichael
(disputed)
TPLF

On 9 September 2020, the Ethiopian region of Tigray held an election for its state council in a direct contravention of the 1995 Constitution of Ethiopia and as such the election was considered illegal by the federal government which -- by the promulgation of the House of Federation -- postponed the 2020 general election earlier in the year because of the COVID-19 pandemic. According to the election organisers, the Tigray People's Liberation Front won 98.2% of the vote and 100% of the 152 seats that were contested.

== Electoral environment ==
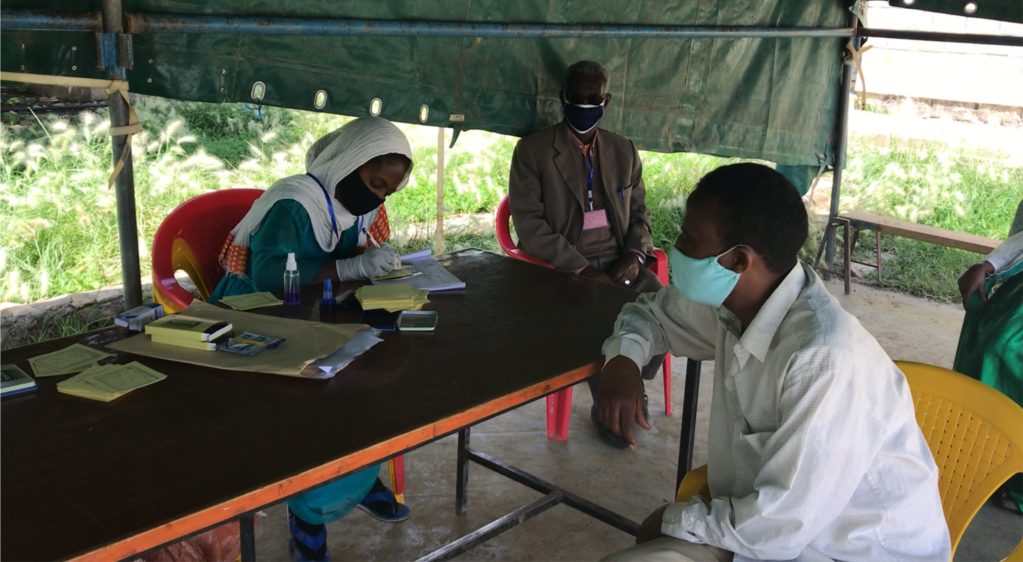
People in Tigray registering to vote in the regional election during the COVID-19 pandemic. (August 2020)

France 24 reported aging war veterans and university students formed long lines to partake in the elections.

600 candidates from five parties competed for 152 seats in the 190 seat legislature. The distribution of the remaining 38 seats will be determined at a later date by participating parties.

The campaign featured televised debates among leaders of different parties. Opposition parties stated that while they had good access to regional media, they also faced some threats and intimidations.

=== Boycott ===
Arena Tigray boycotted the election on the grounds of "political provocations by the TPLF", the COVID-19 pandemic and what it saw as the illegitimacy of the election. The Tigray Democratic Party also stated that it would boycott the election.

== Results ==
Party	Votes	%	Seats	+/–
Tigray People's Liberation Front	2,590,620	98.20	152 or 190	0
National Congress of Great Tigray	20,839	0.80	38 or 0	+38
Tigray Independence Party	18,479	0.71	38 or 0	+38
Salsay Weyane Tigray	7,136	0.28	38 or 0	+38
Assimba Democratic Party	774	0.01	38 or 0	+38
Invalid/blank votes	–	–	–	–
Total	2,633,848	100	190	+38
Registered voters/turnout	–	97.0	–	–
Source: BBC News

On 11 September 2020 the Amharic language service of the BBC reported that, of the 190 members of the state council, 152 were controlled by the TPLF and 38 were to be distributed to rival parties.

However, in local reports in September 2020, the Tigray Region state council allocated 16 seats to the four opposition parties.

Party	Seats	+/–
National Congress of Great Tigray	8	+8
Tigray Independence Party	5	+5
Salsay Weyane Tigray	2	+2
Assimba Democratic Party	1	+1
Total	16	+16
Source: Addis Fortune
