= Tripartite Agreement (Horn of Africa) =

Cooperative agreement between Ethiopia, Eritrea and Somalia in 2018

The Tripartite Agreement, officially the Joint Declaration on Comprehensive Cooperation Between Ethiopia, Somalia and Eritrea, is a cooperation agreement signed by the leaders of Ethiopia, Eritrea and Somalia on 5 September 2018. Designed to "promote regional peace and security" in the Horn of Africa, the agreement was signed in Asmara by Ethiopian prime minister Abiy Ahmed, Somali president Mohamed Abdullahi Mohamed (Farmaajo) and Eritrean president Isaias Afwerki. The tripartite meeting was followed by tripartite meetings in November 2018 and January 2020.

== Terms of September 2018 agreement ==
The agreement states that given their "close ties of geography, history, culture and religion as well as vital common interests" and "respecting each other's independence, sovereignty, and territorial integrity", the three countries agree to cooperate and "build close political, economic, social, cultural and security ties", coordinate to "promote regional peace and security" and establish a Joint High-Level Committee to coordinate the implementation.

== Subsequent meetings ==
The second tripartite meeting was planned for November 2018, with the three national leaders meeting in Gondar and Bahir Dar in Amhara Region.

On 27 January 2020, Abiy, Isaias and Farmaajo held a Tripartite meeting in Asmara. They adopted a Joint Plan of Action for 2020 focussing on "peace, stability, security, and economic and social development" and including a "security" component to "combat and neutralise ... terrorism, arms and human trafficking and drugs smuggling".

== Reactions and analysis ==
The day following the agreement, Stefano Manservisi, the European Commission's Director-General for International Cooperation and Development, welcomed the agreement, stating it "represents an important step to be welcome for peace and development in the Horn and its neighbourood".

Martin Plaut, a journalist specialising in Africa, commented on the lack of a press conference following the January 2020 meeting and criticized the lack of details regarding the Tripartite plans. Plaut suggested that the January meeting, together with bilateral meetings by Abiy to an Eritrean military base in July 2020, Farmaajo to Asmara on 4 October 2020, and Isaias to the Harar Meda Airport air base in Bishoftu on 14–15 October 2020 were used by the three leaders to discuss and prepare strategy for the Tigray War.

In 2021, political scientist Goitom Gebreluel described the 2018 agreement as having the "aim of moulding the regional order according to [the] domestic political ideals" of the three leaders, each of whom were "opposed to federalism, the accommodation of ethnonational diversity, and institutionalised governance" and favoured themselves as powerful leaders running centralised states. He viewed the agreement as destabilising the Horn of Africa, leading to conflicts including the Tigray War. He argued that the three leaders handled inter-state relations similarly to their handling of domestic issues, "conduct[ing] diplomacy through personal channels and resolv[ing] disputes through military means".
