= Tigray Independence Party =

Tigrayan nationalist political party Ethiopia

- Abbreviation: TIP
- Founded: November 2019
- Ideology: Separatism; Tigrayan nationalism Anti-imperialism
- National affiliation: SAWET; Baytona

The Tigray Independence Party (TIP) is a Tigrayan nationalist political party in Ethiopia. Founded in 2020, the party seeks the independence of the Tigray Region.

== Creation ==
In September 2020, BBC News described Tigray Independence Party as "a new opposition party". The party had been founded a few months earlier in Mekelle, on November 2019.

== Policies ==
In September 2020, prior to the 2020 Tigray regional election held that month, TIP's main aim was for Tigray to secede from Ethiopia, becoming independent. It described Ethiopia as an "empire".

== September 2020 election ==
TIP won 18,479 votes out of the 2,633,848 votes cast, winning no seats in the September 2020 election. The Tigray Regional Council resulting from the election established a mechanism for minority parties to propose agendas and bills, present motions, propose policy and nominate appointees. TIP was allotted five seats.

== Tigray War ==
On 2 February 2021, TIP, together with National Congress of Great Tigray and Salsay Weyane Tigray, estimated there to have been 52,000 civilian casualties of the Tigray War.
