= National Congress of Great Tigray =

Tigrayan nationalist political party in Ethiopia

National Congress of Great Tigray ብሄራዊ ባይቶ ዓባይ ትግራይ
- Abbreviation: Baytona
- Founded: September 2020
- Ideology: Tigrayan nationalism
- National affiliation: SAWET; TIP
- Regional affiliation: Tigray Peace and Change Council

The National Congress of Great Tigray (Tigrinya: ብሄራዊ ባይቶ ዓባይ ትግራይ, romanized: bǝherāwi bāyǝto ʿābāy tǝgǝrāy) or Baytona (Tigrinya: ባይቶና) is a political party in the Tigray Region of Ethiopia.

== Policies ==
In September 2020, prior to the 2020 Tigray regional election held that month, Baytona aimed at increased autonomy for Tigray Region, to "secure its territorial integrity, promote its language, and preserve its heritage." Baytona favoured Ethiopia becoming a confederation of independent states.

== September 2020 election ==
Baytona won 20,839 votes out of the 2,633,848 votes cast, winning no seats in the September 2020 election. The Tigray Regional Council resulting from the election established a mechanism for minority parties to propose agendas and bills, present motions, propose policy and nominate appointees. Baytona was allotted seven non-voting seats and one voting seat.

== Tigray War ==
In January 2021, during the Tigray War, the National Election Board of Ethiopia (NEBE) asked Baytona for an "explanation about [its] activities" before taking a possible decision on deregistering the party in relation to its participation in the September 2020 Tigray election, that NEBE considered illegal.

On 2 February 2021, Baytona, together with Tigray Independence Party and Salsay Weyane Tigray, estimated there to have been 52,000 civilian casualties of the Tigray War.
