= Casualties of the Tigray war =

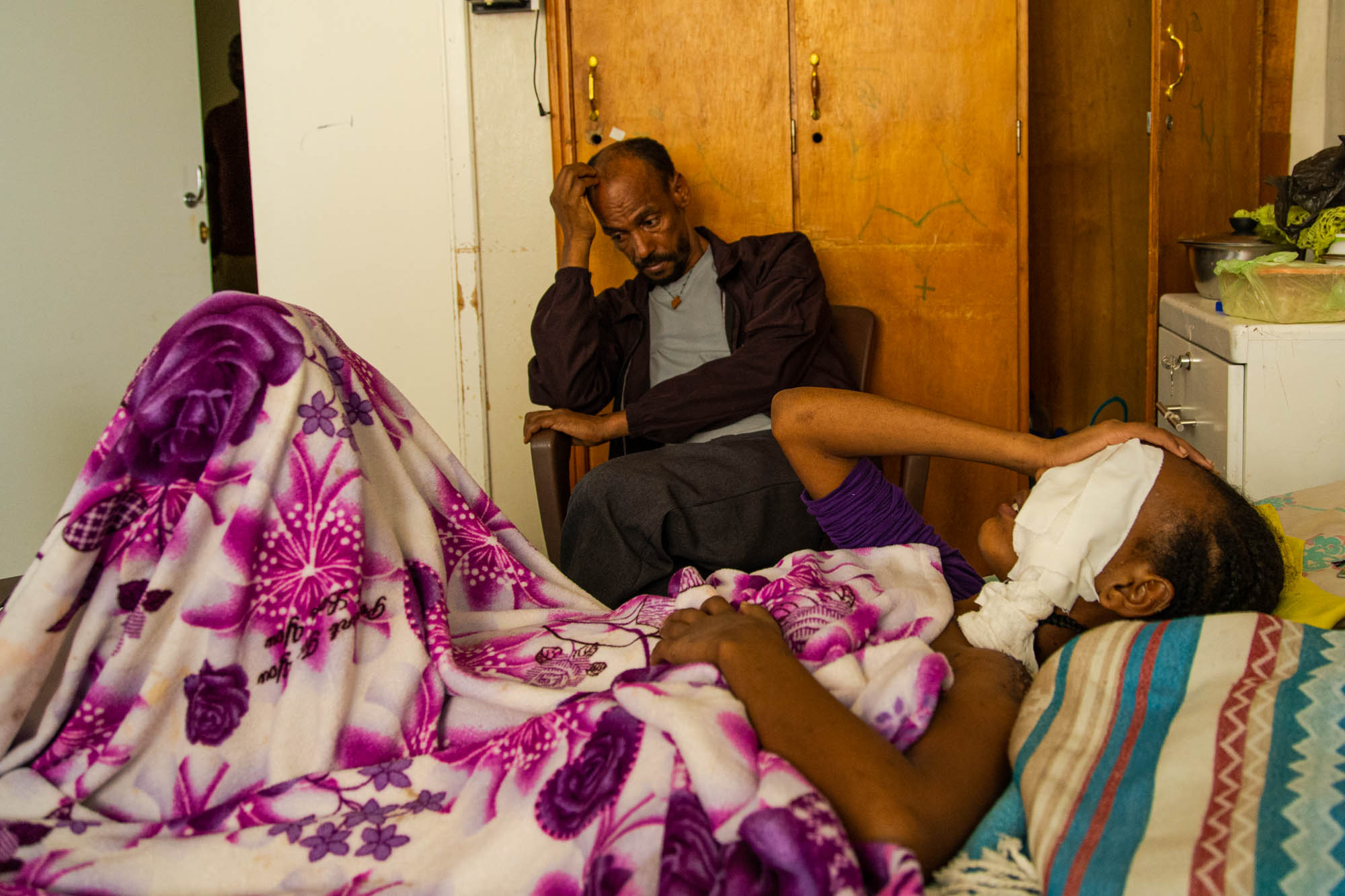
15-year-old in Mekelle who lost an eye after being shot by a sniper

Precise casualty figures of the Tigray war are uncertain. The Uppsala Conflict Data Program recorded over 100,000 battle-related fatalities to the Tigray conflict in 2022 alone, primarily military but including some civilians. A peer-reviewed study by researchers from the University of London calculated over 102,000 excess deaths in Tigray from November 2020 to mid-2022, of which 72% are from violence and the rest from lack of healthcare and famine. According to researchers at Ghent University in Belgium, the combined impact of wartime violence and famine and a lack of medical access had killed an estimated 162,000–378,000 people, with other reported estimates reaching numbers as high as 600,000 killed. The African Union mediator, Olusegun Obasanjo, publicly stated that the war likely killed around 600,000 people. The scale of the death and destruction led The New York Times to describe it in November 2022 as "one of the world's bloodiest contemporary conflicts."

== Breakdown ==
True casualties statistics have been difficult to determine, largely due to deliberate information blackouts in the region. Journalists have noted the difficulty they face attempting to report on the war, as the Ethiopian government has taken steps to reduce press access to the Tigray Region, facing the risk of getting killed or imprisoned. It is also been reported that there is an unwillingness from either side to fully confirm precise numbers.

While Prime Minister of Ethiopia Abiy Ahmed initially spoke of no civilian casualties in the early days of the war, by February 2021, he described the level of death in Tigray as "hav[ing] caused much distress for me personally.”

| Breakdown | Estimated & claimed casualties | Time period | Source |
|---|---|---|---|
| Civilians | 52,000+ killed | 3 November 2020 – 2 February 2021 | Tigrayan opposition parties |
| Military (all sides) | 100,000+ killed | 3 November 2020 – 16 February 2021 | TPLF |
| Military (all sides) | 100,000 killed | September 2022 – October 2022 | Kjetil Tronvoll |
| TPLF allied forces | 3,400+ killed, 1,300 wounded | 3 November 2020 – c. September 2021 (Note: As reported by the BBC; a specific timeframe was not given. Local correspondents to the agency suggested these figures could be from then-recent battles, and not the war as a whole.) | ENDF |
| Ethiopian and Eritrean allied forces | 9,273 killed, 6,473 wounded | 3 November 2020 – c. September 2021 | TPLF |
| Ethiopian and Eritrean allied forces | 90,000+ Ethiopian casualties (Note: According to de Waal, while not all 90,000 casualties were deaths, "many of the wounded will die" due to the poor condition of medical services.) | September 2022 | Alex de Waal |
| Total deaths | 100,000+ killed | 1 January 2022 – 3 November 2022 | Uppsala Conflict Data Program |
| Total deaths | 102,000 killed | 3 November 2020 – 3 November 2022 | University of London |
| Total deaths | 162,000–378,000 killed | 3 November 2020 – 4 November 2022 | Ghent University |
| Total deaths | 600,000 killed | 3 November 2020 – 4 November 2022 | Olusegun Obasanjo |

== Massacres ==
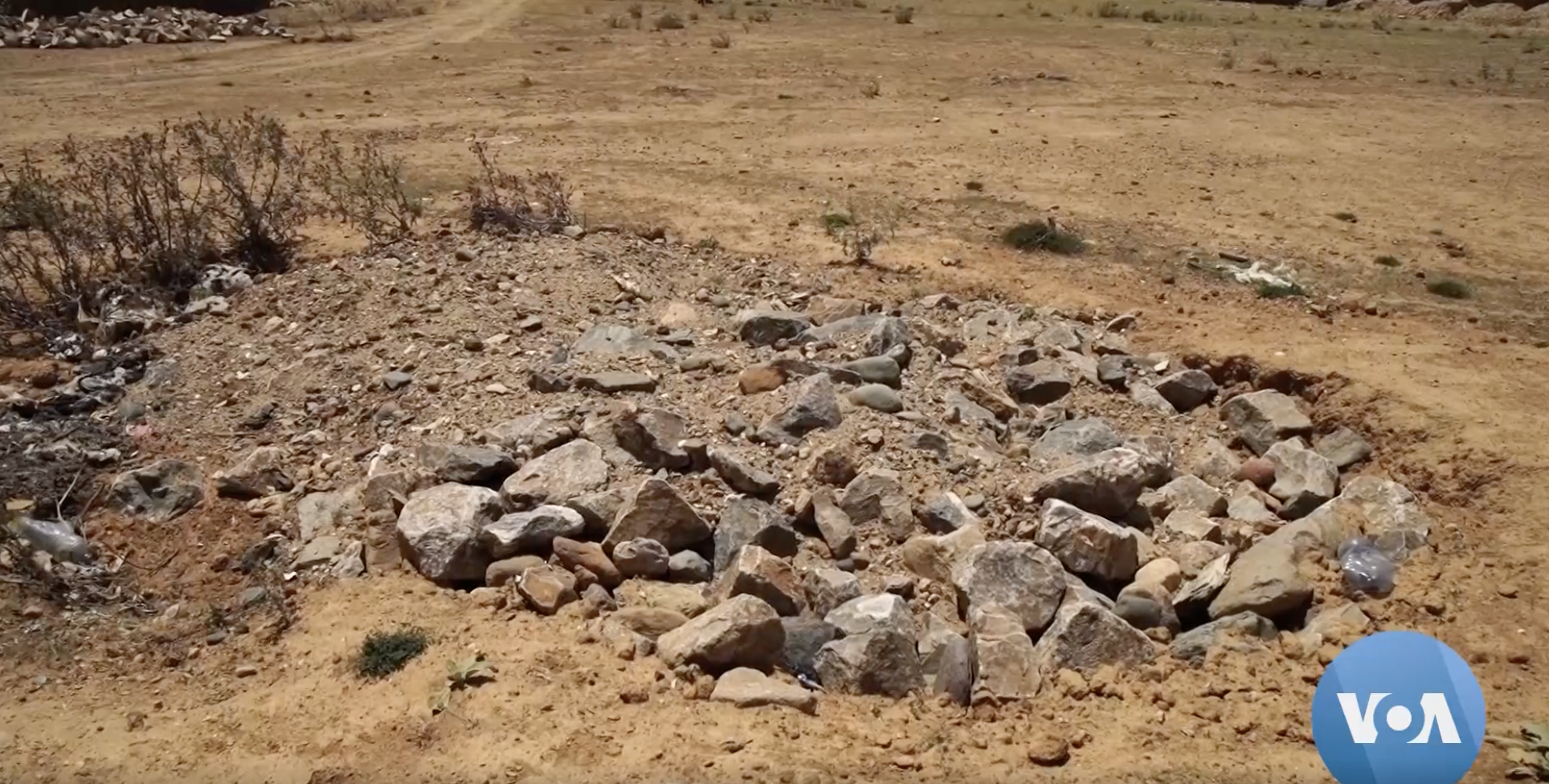
A mass grave of civilians in Tigray

Numerous reports have been made of extrajudicial killings and summary executions (in many cases, targeting civilians) since the war began.

Terminology:

- ENDF – Ethiopian National Defense Forces
- EDF – Eritrean Defense Forces
- TDF – Tigrayan Defense Forces
- Fano – Amhara militia

| Date | Place | Number | Perpetrators | Sources | Notes |
|---|---|---|---|---|---|
| 4–10 November 2020 | Shiglil | 7 | Government-allied militias | | |
| 9–10 November 2020 | Humera | 54 | Fano | | related: EHRC report |
| 5–19 November 2020 | Dansha | 25 | | | Civilians were caught in the crossfire between warring parties |
| 9–10 November 2020 | Mai Kadra | 600 or 1100 | Tigrayan Samri kebele youths or Fano militias | | victim ethnicity and perpetrators disputed |
| 13–17 November 2020 | Zalambessa | 86 | EDF | | Killed mostly in house-to-house searches after shelling the town |
| 14–17 November 2020 | Bisober | 27–31 | TDF & ENDF | | Shelling crossfire and house-to-house search |
| 17 November 2020 | Shire | 200 | EDF | | Elders say people were "slaughtered like chicken" |
| c. 19 November 2020 | Hitsats | 305 | TDF or EDF | | Perpetrators disputed. EEPA claims 300 Eritrean refugees executed by EDF, HRW claims EDF, refugees claim local Tigrayan militia or EDF, Ethiopia claims TPLF; five humanitarian workers killed in battle |
| 21 November 2020 | Idaga Hamus | Dozens | EDF | | after capture of town |
| c. 21 November 2020 | Adigrat | 12 | EDF | | after capture of town |
| 27–28 November 2020 | Wukro | 220 | EDF, ENDF | | killing spree accompanying the massive looting of the town |
| 28–29 November 2020 | Axum | 750 | EDF | initial body counts; in-depth | Daily killings preceded and followed the main massacre. |
| 30 November 2020 | Dengelat | 80–150 | EDF | | at Maryam Dengelat church |
| late November/early December 2020 | Irob | 52 | EDF | | 50 men, 2 women |
| 1 December 2020 | Mekelle | 27 | ENDF | | |
| 4–7 December 2020 | Ziban Gedena | 150–300 | EDF | | Also: 150 houses burnt, 90% of livestock killed, harvests burnt and stolen |
| 13 December 2020 | Kola Tembien | 20 | ENDF | | Soldiers kept terrorising civilians in Tembien in an effort to get the location of the leader of the TPLF. |
| c. 23 December 2020 | Hawzen | up to 70 | EDF | | 70 bodies recognised by witness |
| 5 January 2021 | Gu'itelo | 29 | EDF | | at Medhane-Alem church |
| 8 January 2021 | Bora | 70–187 | ENDF | | Killing spree after a battle with TDF |
| 9 January 2021 | Ari Giyergis | 12 | EDF | | 12 young deacons taken out of the church and executed |
| mid-January 2021 | Mahbere Dego | 50–74 | ENDF (Amharic speaking) | | People were executed and thrown off a cliff, according to geolocated video evidence. |
| January 2021 | Irob | 187 | EDF | | includes 30 Coptic priests, 50 women, 100 children |
| 1 February 2021 | Kerebera | 5 | ENDF & EDF | | five priests were killed in the village church |
| 10 February 2021 | Wukro | 18 | EDF | | killed in street protests |
| 10 February 2021 | Kola Tembien | 182 | ENDF, EDF | | house-to-house killing; access to bodies permitted on 15 Feb, by which time many were partially eaten by wildlife |
| few days before 14 February 2021 | Adwa + Shire | 30 | EDF | | killed in street protests |
| 15 Feb | Cheli | 180 | EDF | | |
| c. 19 February 2021 | Khisret, Gijet | 100+ | EDF | | |
| 22 February 2021 | Debrekerbe | 9 | EDF | | |
| 23 February 2021 | May Weyni | 80 | EDF | | |
| 1–3 March 2021 | Humera | 250 | Amhara militia, Fano, EDF | | |
| 11 March 2021 | Enkikumel, near Shire | 100+ | ENDF/EDF | | Reports suggest that ENDF/EDF soldiers went door to door and kidnapped civilians in order to force militias to give up their weapons and surrender. Once the militias surrendered, they and the remaining hostages were all executed. All victims were reportedly young men. |
| 14 March 2021 | Wukro | 3–5 | ENDF/EDF | | retaliation for attacks by TDF |
| 23 March 2021 | Inda Teka Tesfay between Mekelle and Adigrat | 4 | ENDF | | Médecins Sans Frontières staff observed the execution of at least four men by the ENDF. They were taken off a public bus and executed. |
| 24 March 2021 | Grizana, near Samre | 11–18 | EDF | | |
| 30 March – 5 April 2021 | Wukro Maray | ~161 | EDF & ENDF | | As revenge for lost battles |
| 1 or 3 April 2021 | May Atsmi, Tisha and Haddush Addi, Tahtay Maychew district | ~140 | EDF | | As revenge for lost battles |
| 5 April 2021 | Debrekerbe in Zana district | 116 | EDF | | |
| 5 April 2021 | Haruka kebele, Afar Region | 30+ | Afar Regional Special Forces | | |
| 8 April 2021 | Freweyni | 7 | EDF | | |
| 8 April 2021 | Hawzen | 30+ | EDF | | |
| 8 April 2021 | Around Wukro Maray, between Shire and Axum | 200+ | ENDF and EDF | | |
| 12 April 2021 | Adwa, Central Tigray | 3–9 | EDF | | |
| 12 April 2021 | village near Axum | 11 | presumably EDF | | |
| 12 April 2021 | Hugumburda, Southern Tigray | 15 | Amhara militias and ENDF | | |
| c. 12 April 2021 | Wukro Maray town near Aksum | 300+ | EDF | | |
| 29 April 2021 | Idaga Hibret | 20 | EDF | | |
| 30 April 2021 | (Bure, Amhara and Danchu Kebelle) | 21 | EDF | | During the attacks, some civilians had reportedly been burnt alive. |
| 8 May 2021 | Guh village, Hawzien, Eastern Tigray | 19 | EDF | | |
| 12 June 2021 | Menji and Guyya villages near the town of Abi-Adi Tembien. | 16 | EDF and ENDF | | Reports indicate that cluster bombs and phosphorus gas was used in the shelling of both villages. |
| 22 June 2021 | Togoga village | 50–80 | ENDF | | 50–80 civilians were killed in an airstrike on the village's market area. Reports indicate that the ENDF blocked ambulances from attending to the dead and wounded in the village, possibly increasing the casualty toll. |
| 17–19 July 2021 | Yalo | 20 | TDF or ENDF | | Victims of shelling |
| ~3 August 2021 | Humera and elsewhere along the Tekezé River | 95 | Amhara militia, Fano, EDF | | The victims had been shot with their hands tied |
| 5 August 2021 | Galikoma, Afar Region | 107–200 | TDF | | Indiscriminate killing by TDF |
| 31 August–4 September 2021 | Chenna (near Dabat) | 120–200 | TDF | | Extrajudicial killings; Using civilians as human shields |
| 9 September 2021 | Kobo | 600 | TDF | | Extrajudicial killings |
| 30 October 2021 | Kombolcha, Amhara region | 100+ | TDF | | Extrajudicial killings, looting and ransacking WFP and UN trucks and aid essentials, private and public properties. |
| 8 October 2021 | Mekelle | 3 | ENDF | | Airstrike killing civilians, all children |
| 21 November 2021 | Prison camp near Mirab Abaya, SNNPR | 83 (+20 missing) | Ethiopian police | | Massacre of imprisoned Tigrayan soldiers; according to The Washington Post, the prisoners in question had not engaged in combat against the government. |
| 6 January 2022 | Mai Aini refugee camp | 3 | Unknown | | Airstrike killing Eritrean refugees, including 2 children |
| 7 January 2022 | Dedebit | 56–59 | ENDF | | Airstrike hitting a camp for internally displaced people; has been called a war crime by the UN and Human Rights Watch |
| 10–11 January 2022 | Mai Tsebri and Hiwane | 19 | ENDF | | Drone strike killing civilians |
| 23 February 2022 | Chenna and Kobo | 24+ | TDF | | Extrajudicial killings |
| 23 February 2022 | Berhale | 5+ | Unknown; suspected to be the TDF | | Extrajudicial killings of Eritrean refugees |
| 26 August 2022 | Mekelle | 4 | ENDF | | Airstrike killing civilians, including 2 children |
| 6–12 September 2022 | Sheraro | 40+ | EDF | | Extrajudicial killings of civilians, including Eritrean refugees |
| 6–12 September 2022 | Shimblina | 46 | ENDF/EDF | | |
| 13–14 September 2022 | Mekelle | 10 | Unclear; suspected to be the ENDF | | Airstrike killing civilians, |
| 13–15 September 2022 | Kobo | 17+ | TDF | | Systemic torture and killings of civilians |
| 4 October 2022 | Adi Daero, La'ilay Adiyabo | 50-65+ | ENDF | | Airstrike hitting a school sheltering internally displaced people |
| 24 October 2022 | Egela district, Tigray | 96 | EDF | | Extrajudicial killings of civilians |
| 26 October 2022 | Adwa | 60+ | EDF | | Extrajudicial killings of civilians |
| 17–25 November 2022 | Eastern Zone, Tigray | 111 | EDF | | Kidnapping, extrajudicial killings of civilians; 241 houses destroyed and overall "widespread looting." |
| Mid December 2022 | Central Zone, Tigray | 550+ | EDF | | Extrajudicial killings and mass rapes. |

== Civilian deaths ==
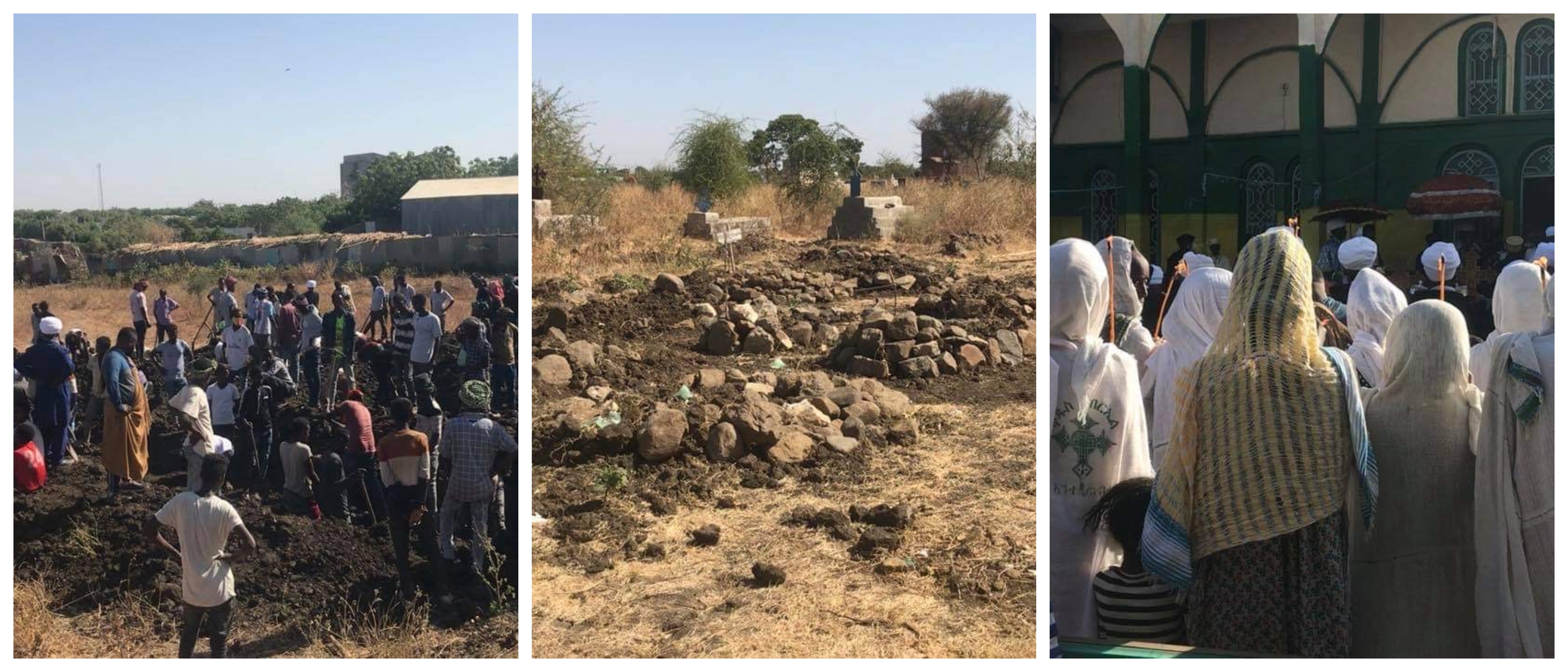
Mass graves in Maikadra and funeral services

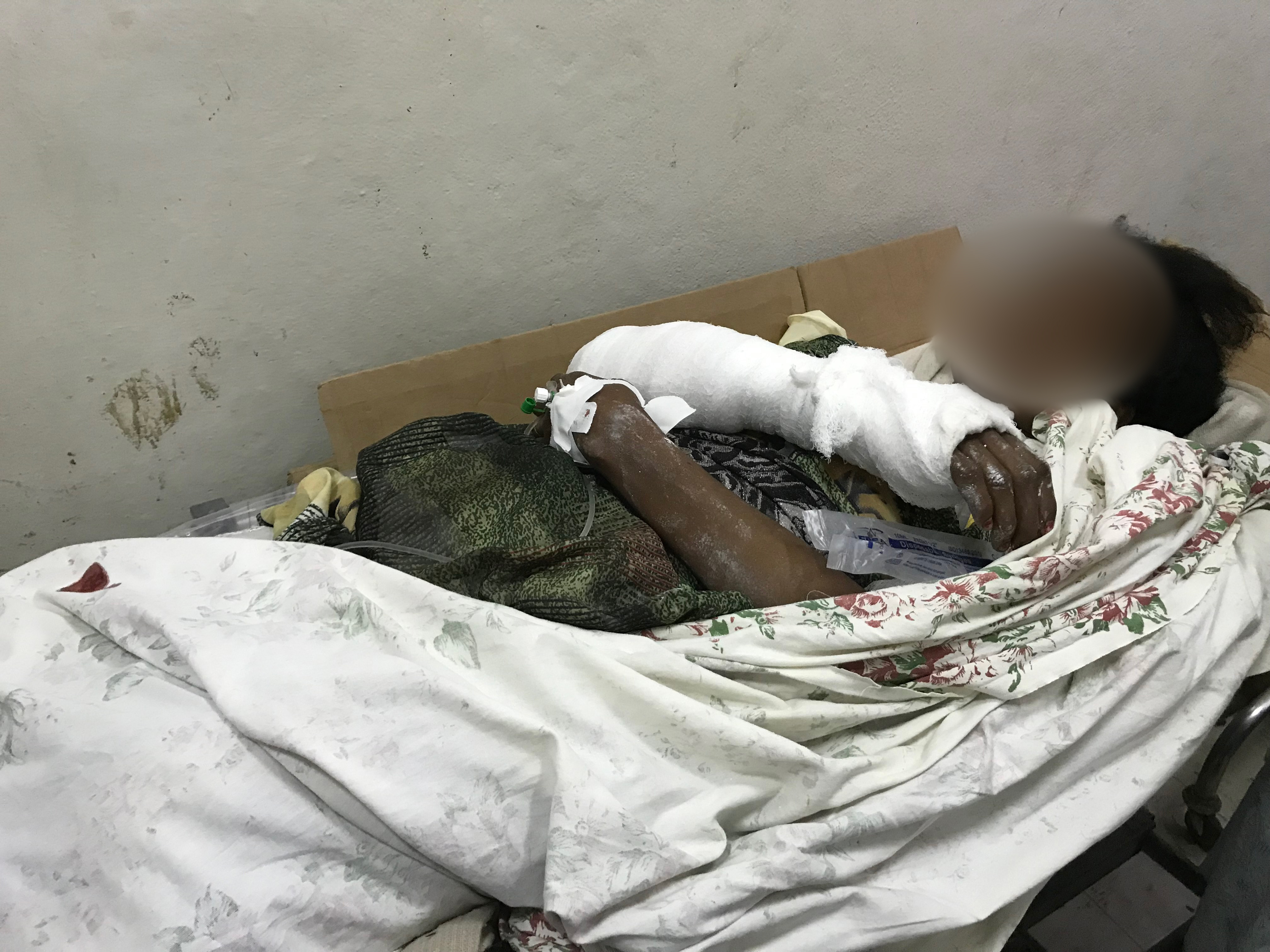
One of the civilian victims of the Togoga airstrike

As of 2 February 2021, the highest estimate of civilian deaths in the Tigray War is that given by three of the opposition parties from the 2020 Tigray regional election: National Congress of Great Tigray, Tigray Independence Party, and Salsay Woyane Tigray, which were allocated 15 seats in September 2020, prior to the war. The three parties' statement, published on 2 February 2021, estimated that at least 52,000 civilians had been killed by the ENDF, the Eritrean Defence Forces (EDF), Amhara militias, and other forces allied with the ENDF. Hailu Kebede, head of foreign affairs in Salsay Woyane Tigray, said that the three parties' collection method was to try to register data from witnesses in every administrative area of Tigray Region. He stated that "thousands" of names were already recorded.

A peer-reviewed study by researchers from the University of London calculated over 102,000 excess deaths in Tigray from November 2020 to mid-2022, of which 72% are from violence and the rest from lack of healthcare and famine. According to researchers at Ghent University in Belgium, the combined impact of wartime violence and famine and a lack of medical access had killed an estimated 162,000–378,000 people, with other reported estimates reaching numbers as high as 600,000 killed. The African Union mediator, Olusegun Obasanjo, publicly stated that the war likely killed around 600,000 people.

== Military deaths ==
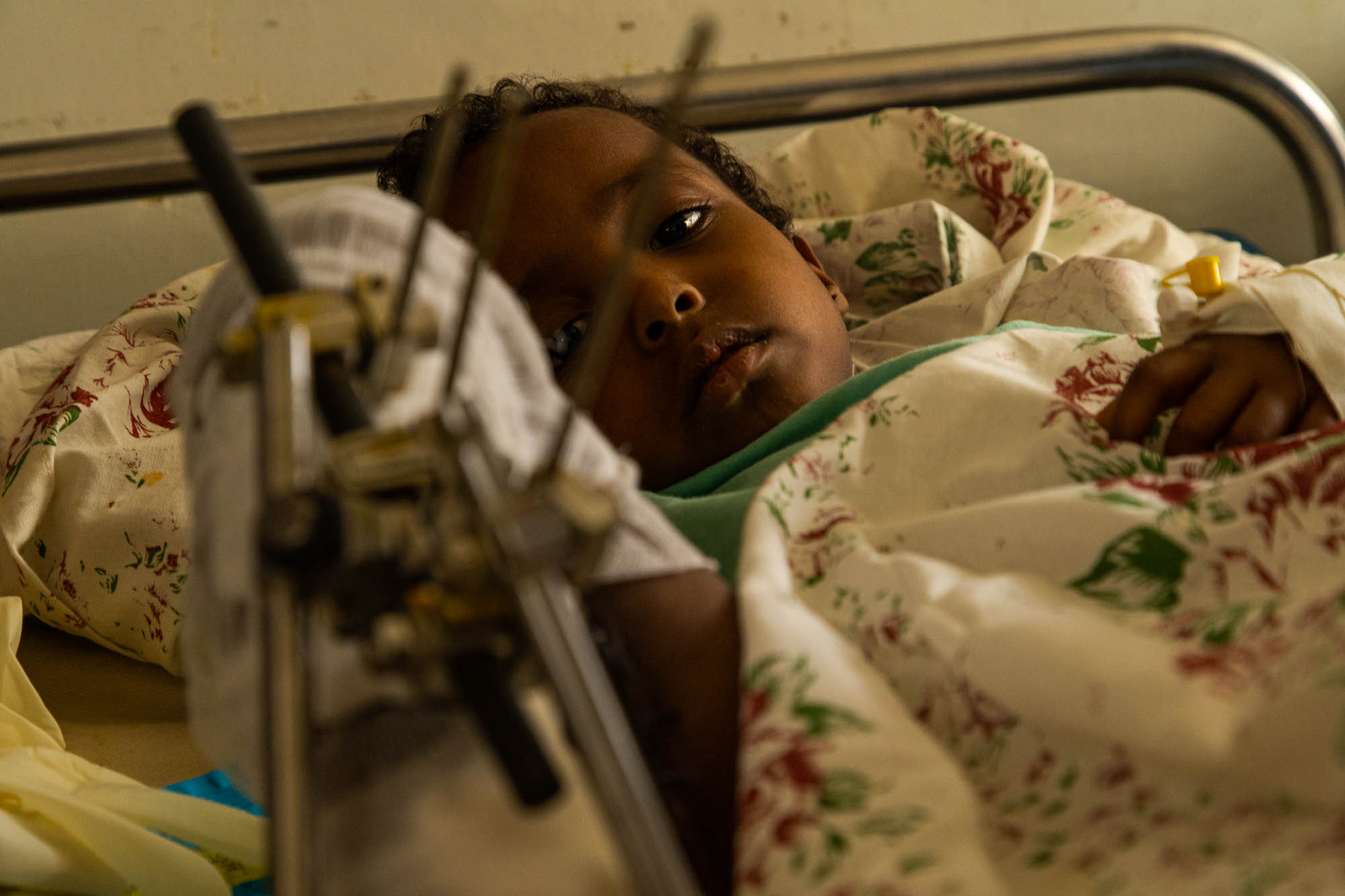
Samwarit, 4, lies on her hospital bed recovering from knife wounds in her leg and a gunshot in her hand, according to her father, in Mekelle, Tigray, June 4, 2021.

=== 2020 ===
An ENDF soldier present at the attack on the Adigrat base of the ENDF Northern Command during the 4 November Northern Command attacks, Bulcha, stated to BBC News that there were 32 ENDF fatalities and 100 TPLF fatalities.

Based on its 14–18 November 2020 visit and a visit starting 10 January 2021 to the Tigray Region, the Ethiopian Human Rights Commission (EHRC) reported a Humera hospital employee's count of the war deaths as 92, including military (ENDF and TPLF) and civilian deaths.

An estimated 760 troops (ENDF and TPLF) were killed during fighting in the Raya region.

The TPLF claimed on 24 November to have killed thousands of ENDF and Eritrean in three fronts: Adwa, Idagahamus and Ray-Mokoni. They also claimed to have killed almost an entire Ethiopian division during fighting at Raya. This division is the 21st mechanised division.

On 7 December 2020 heavy fighting broke out between AMISOM troops and Ethiopian troops in Hiran region, Somalia, when Ethiopian troops tried to disarm Tigrayan troops. In total 21 Tigrayan soldiers and 20 Ethiopian soldiers were killed.

=== 2022 ===
In September 2022, Ethiopian and Eritrean forces launched a massive "joint" offensive against rebels in Tigray. The Ethiopian army reportedly suffered 90,000 casualties in one month.
