= Kombolcha massacre =

2021 ethnic massacre in Ethiopia

- Part of the Tigray War
- Kombolcha (Ethiopia)
- Location: Kombolcha, Amhara Region, Ethiopia
- Date: 30 October 2021
- Target: Amhara
- Attack type: Civilians massacre: UN's aid essentials and WFP trucks looted; Private and public properties ransacked and looted; Dire situation of the Amhara IDPs; Impunity
- Deaths: 100+
- Perpetrator: Tigray Defense Forces

The Kombolcha massacre was the mass extrajudicial and summary execution of over 100 ethnic Amhara civilian youths by the Tigray Defense Forces in South Wollo, in the Amhara Region of Ethiopia. Bodies of the victims were set on fire at a business compound in the town. Kombolcha was described as a key warring location and is found on the A2 highway leading into Addis Ababa, where the Tigrayan forces were advancing to the capital. Looting of aid, and private and public properties was also reported. Kombolcha town is the industrial hub of the Amhara region.

== Background ==
The TPLF was the ruling party of Ethiopia that ruled the country for 27 years. Regime changes occurred in 2018 in which the TPLF lost control of federal positions while holding power in the Tigray Region. The power struggle between Abiy Ahmed’s regime and the TPLF led to the Tigray War that started after the Ethiopian military's Northern Command was attacked by TPLF in November 2020. As the war prolonged, the Tigrayan rebels retook most of Tigray and invaded the Amhara and the Afar regions in July 2021, reportedly massacring civilians and causing severe destructions.

== Massacre ==
Kombolcha was captured by the Tigray Defense Forces (TDF) in late October 2021. The massacre of ethnic Amhara civilians occurred on 30 October 2021, following the infiltration of the attackers into the town. Residents reported chaotic nights and gunshots. The massacre of the 100 youths occurred after a year of continuous fighting in the Tigray War, and with the invasion of Tigray forces into the Amhara region. Surviving residents reported that they had spent the day in their homes as gunfire shook the town. TDF combatants summarily executed the youths, and reportedly set the victims on fire at a compound of a Turkish-based company. AAA identified partial victim's list and published testimonies.

Fatalities
Killed (partial list of 100+ total victims)
1. Mohammed Kedir
2. Anwar Yimam
3. Kedir Mohammed
4. Abdu Kebede
5. Mohammed Yimam
6. Kedir Abel
7. Abdurahman Kassa
8. Said Adu
9. Kedir Mohammed Ahmed
10. Kedir Edris Muhe
11. Wondosen Abate
12. Tadesse
13. Belete
14. Ashenafi Berew
15. Abdurahman
16. Kedir Edris Muhie
17. Mohammed Yesuf Ali
18. Aziza Kedir
19. Edris Said
20. Habiba Yimam
21. Erozina Ibrahim
22. Hawa Nuriye
23. Zeritu Shifferaw
24. Hayat Said
25. Hawa Ali
26. Muahimed

== Looting and ransacking ==
Tigray forces reportedly looted and ransacked foreign aid essentials, and private and public properties, including the WFP food supplies for malnourished children in Kombolcha. WFP reported that it suspended distributing food aid after Tigray gunmen looted its warehouses, and stole large quantities of essential food supplies while holding aid staff at gunpoint. A UN spokesperson also communicated another mass looting in the town, and the additional hijacking of 18 WFP aid trucks by the TPLF forces. The government reported looting and damages to these manufacturing industries in Kombolcha and Dessie: 10 food processing, 11 leather and textile factories, 3 metal processing factories, 11 Agro-processing, and 10 chemical industries. TPLF also destroyed infrastructure and facilities such as schools and health stations.

== IDP crisis ==
The humanitarian crisis remains dire for Amhara IDPs. Kombolcha and Dessie were already the refugee destinations for millions of Amhara IDPs who fled North Wollo from TPLF attackers. AAA reported the dire situation of the IDPs sheltered in the surroundings of public schools. Civic groups expressed concern on the lack of support from government bodies— stated that the IDPs had not been given attention in both Dessie and Kombolcha.

== Reactions ==
=== State of Emergency ===
The November 2021 state of emergency was declared during the TPLF invasion of Kombolcha and after civilians massacre.

=== Calls for evacuation ===
The UN and some foreign diplomats urged citizens and families to leave Ethiopia with the state of emergency following occupation of Kombolcha and the killing of the 100 Amhara youths.

- Government of Ethiopia: Senior Ethiopian officials described the calls for evacuation as disinformation and propaganda. Ethiopia accused the United States for spreading 'false information' about war.
- Zambia: President Hakainde Hichilema ordered the diplomats and their families to evacuate, and repatriated 31 workers from the embassy in Addis Ababa
- United States: Department of State and the U.S. embassy in Addis Ababa advised its citizens to leave the country "as soon as possible", and set-up a task force.
- Canada: The Foreign Minister urged citizens to leave Ethiopia immediately, and communicated the security as "rapidly deteriorating".
- United Kingdom: The Africa minister warned against travel to the whole country, and called for British nationals to leave "now while commercial flights are readily available".
- France: The French embassy emailed its citizens and called for "All French nationals are formally urged to leave the country without delay".
- Germany: Germany's foreign minister called for its nationals to depart on the "first available commercial flights".
- UN (United Nations) : UN security asked the organization to "co-ordinate the evacuation and departure no later than 25 November 2021".

== Retreat and withdrawal ==
Reports covered that Kombolcha was recaptured by the Ethiopian Federal army and the Amhara forces, and TPLF retreated out of the town— reversing TPLF's short-lived gains on the war front. TPLF denied defeat and carrying out the massacre.

== See also ==
- Chenna massacre
- Galikoma massacre
- Kobo massacre
- Mai Kadra massacre
