= Mai Kadra massacre =

2020 ethnic cleansing in the Tigray War of Ethiopia

Coordinates: 14°04′12″N 36°33′54″E

- Part of Tigray War
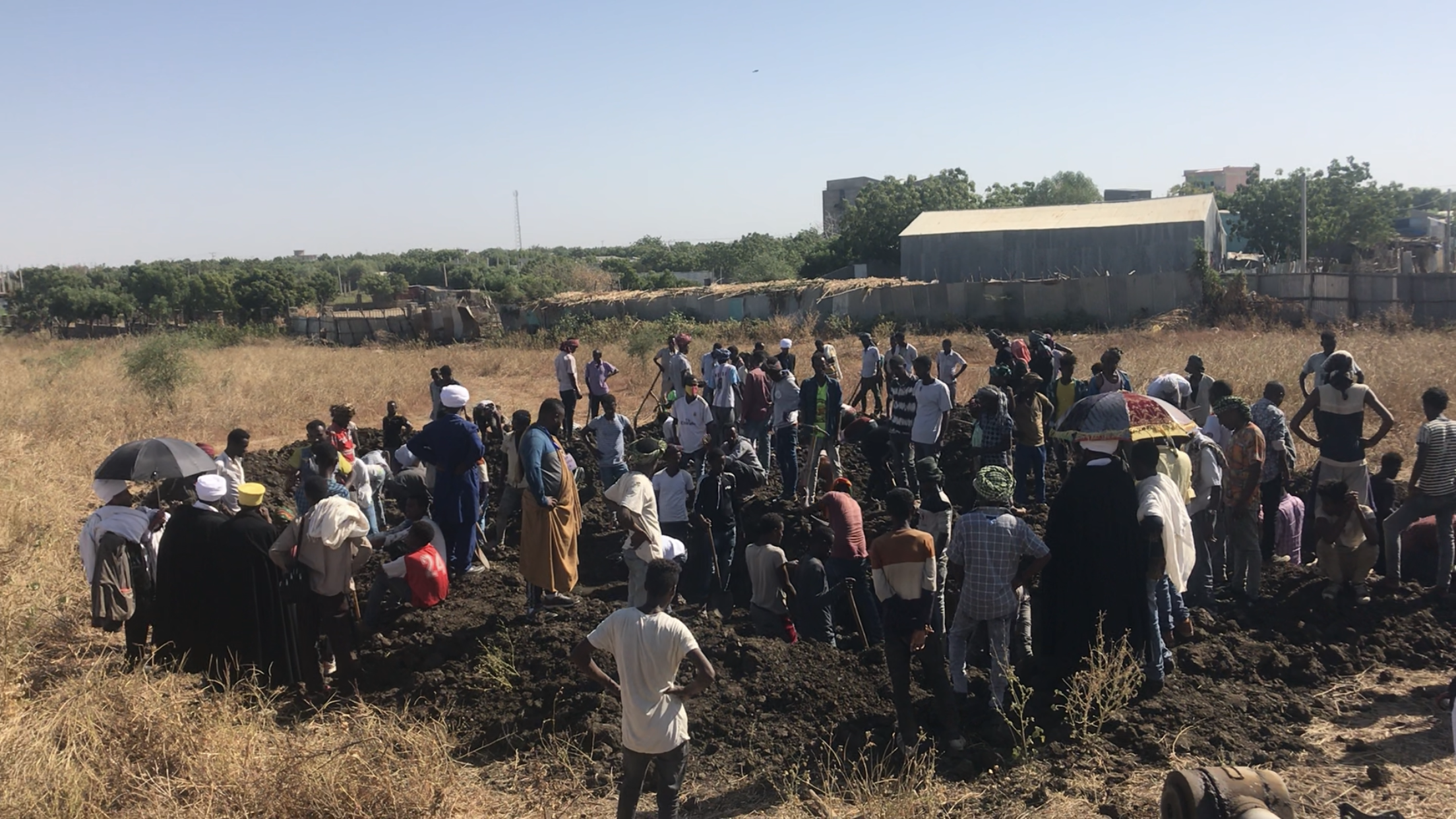
- Funeral service for the massacre in Mai Kadra

- Location of Mai Kadra in Tigray and Ethiopia
- Location: Mai Kadra, Tigray Region, Ethiopia
- Date: 9–10 November 2020 (5 years ago)
- Target: Locals and migrant workers (mostly Amhara per OHCHR, Amnesty, EHRCO and Agence France-Presse; mostly Amhara per EHRC; Tigrayans per Associated Press, Agence France-Presse, Financial Times))
- Attack type: Mass killing, ethnic cleansing, war crime, massacre
- Deaths: 600 to 1,100 (varying estimates)
- Perpetrators: (Tigray Region) Tigrayan youths and police (per Amnesty, OHCHR, EHRC, EHRCO); (Tigray Region) forces loyal to TPLF (per Amnesty, OHCHR, EHRC, Agence France-Presse, Financial Times); Fano (per Financial Times, Associated Press, Vice); (Ethiopia) Ethiopian National Defense Force (per Associated Press, Agence France-Presse)

The Mai Kadra massacre was a massacre and ethnic cleansing carried out during the Tigray War on 9–10 November 2020 in the town of Mai Kadra in Welkait (a disputed area between the Amhara and Tigray Regions) in northwestern Ethiopia, near the Sudanese border. The victims have been described as civilians, many of whom were day laborers hailing from neighboring Amhara Region. Responsibility was attributed to a pro-Tigray People's Liberation Front (TPLF) youth group and forces loyal to the TPLF in the EHRC-OHCHR Tigray Investigation, preliminary investigations by Amnesty International (AI), the Ethiopian Human Rights Commission (EHRC) and the Ethiopian Human Rights Council (EHRCO), and interviews conducted in Mai Kadra by Agence France-Presse. The Office of the United Nations High Commissioner for Human Rights (OHCHR) and EHRC reported that at least 5 Tigrayans were also killed in Mai Kadra by Amhara militas such as Fano in retaliation. Tigrayan refugees in Sudan told multiple news outlets that Tigrayans in Mai Kadra were targeted by either Amhara militias, the Ethiopian National Defense Force (ENDF), or both.

The killings took place amidst an armed conflict between the TPLF-led regional government and the federal government. They began before the ENDF troops entered the town. The total death toll remains unclear, but according to AI, "likely hundreds" were killed. Two videos, which were analyzed by AI to prove that the massacre had taken place, show dozens of corpses with injuries caused by bladed weapons, like machetes. According to the EHRC, which described the massacre as a "widespread and systematic attack directed against a civilian population" at least 600 people were killed; EHRCO counted 1,100 deaths. Most of the victims were Amhara according to AI, OHCHR, EHRC, and EHRCO investigations, but there were Tigrayan victims as well.

== Background ==
Throughout 2019 and 2020, tensions progressively increased between the Ethiopian federal government, led by Prime Minister Abiy Ahmed, and the local government of the Tigray Region, led by Chief Administrator Debretsion Gebremichael, over allegations that members of the ruling Tigray People's Liberation Front (TPLF), which was the dominant force in Ethiopian politics after the fall of Mengistu Haile Mariam in 1991, were being unfairly targeted for prosecution by the central government, and misgivings of the Eritrea–Ethiopia peace deal, which the TPLF viewed as endangering its security.

Federal-state relations deteriorated considerably after the region held local elections in September 2020, which the TPLF claimed to have won in a landslide, despite the Ethiopian government having postponed elections until 2021 due to the COVID-19 pandemic. After the elections, both sets of governments proclaimed the other illegitimate and illegal; the federal government maintaining that the regional elections had been extra-constitutional and neither free nor fair, and the regional government insisting that the federal government did not uphold the constitution which stated that elections should occur every 5 years and that its mandate had expired, rendering its authority null and void.

In November 2020, open conflict broke out between the two governments when Tigray Region security forces attacked the headquarters of the Northern Command of the Ethiopian National Defence Force (ENDF) in Mekelle. The federal government quickly launched an offensive to restore its authority, in concerted effort with regional security forces from the Amhara and Afar Regions. The Ethiopian government shut down communications in Tigray, access to the Internet was blocked, banking was closed for residents of Tigray, as was transportation to and from Tigray. The central government also imposed tight restrictions on access for aid and humanitarian agencies. The Ethiopian government prioritized securing of the region's border with Sudan and the border town of Humera, thereby forestalling any possibility of TPLF forces opening a cross-border supply route.

== Killings ==
=== Preparations ===
The Ethiopian Human Rights Commission published its preliminary findings on 24 November, reporting that a few days before the attack, local militia (or "special force") and the police barred all exit points from Mai Kadra. Migrant workers, who mainly hailed from the neighboring Amhara Region, were additionally prohibited from going to their places of work or moving about the town. Checkpoints would have been established at the four main exit points by Tigrayan youths. Residents who attempted to flee the town to the outlying farmlands or across the border to Sudan were forced back by the local security forces.

According to the EHRC and EHRCO reports, on the morning of 9 November, local police began going door-to-door in certain neighborhoods, particularly those where migrant workers lived, checking identity cards to identify non-Tigrayans, detaining at least 60 people who were found to be in possession of Sudanese SIM cards in their mobile phones. (Note: In Ethiopia ID cards include one's ethnic identification.) According to survivors, this was done to prevent calls for help or other communications once the attack had started, as the federal government had already shut off Internet and mobile services to the region, meaning Ethiopian SIM cards did not work. Ethnic Tigrayan women and children were also told to leave the town shortly before the massacre. The EHRC-OHCHR Tigray Investigation reported similar conclusions.

=== Attacks ===
Reports on the attacks include two primary claims: that of local youth perpetrators loyal to the TPLF; and that of Amhara militia perpetrators. Later reports suggest that both groups may have been involved in a series of massacres. According to the EHRC-OHCHR Tigray Investigation, on 9 November 2020, a local Tigrayan youth group (Samri), the local administration, police, and other militias allied with the TPLF killed hundreds of Amhara civilians in Mai Kadra, then Amhara militias killed at least five Tigrayans in retaliation after the ENDF and Amhara Special Forces (ASF) had captured the town.

The killings started in the early afternoon of 9 November, at 11:00 in some areas, and in others around 15:00, when a former militiaman who had refused to get involved as tensions mounted was killed by a former colleague and his body burned along with his house, according to survivors, including the militiaman's wife. After this incident kebele youths, in groups of 20 to 30 each, accompanied by 3 or 4 members of the local police and militia, went house-to-house killing people who had already been identified as ethnic Amharas or other minorities, "beating them with batons/sticks, stabbing them with knives, machetes and hatchets and strangling them with ropes", as well as looting properties. Because migrant workers were living up to 10 to 15 in a house, the death toll quickly escalated. Police and militiamen were posted at key street intersections, shooting anyone trying to escape the violence. Some people managed to survive by hiding in rafters, pretending to be dead, or successfully evading security forces and fleeing into the rural hinterland. Nevertheless, some people were followed into the outlying areas and killed there as well. Many ethnic Tigrayan residents however gave shelter to their neighbors, by hiding them in their homes, in churches and on farms. One woman first hid 13 people in her home, before leading them to a nearby farm, and another was struck by the youths with a machete while trying to separate them from a man who had been lit on fire.

Fisseha Tekle was the Amnesty International researcher who first reported this massacre for Amnesty's preliminary report. Amnesty interviewed witnesses who had provided food to the ENDF. The witnesses said that forces loyal to the Tigray People's Liberation Front (TPLF) were responsible, apparently after they had fought against ENDF forces. Three people told Amnesty International that survivors of the massacre told them that they were attacked by members of Tigray Special Police Force and other TPLF members. According to witnesses interviewed by the EHRC, ethnic Amharas and local Wolkait people were the primary targets of the attack, but several members of other ethnic groups were also killed in the violence. Men were also specifically targeted over women and children, but many of them were physically injured and threatened with future attacks. The killings continued until the early hours of 10 November, when the perpetrators fled the town to avoid the advancing forces of the Ethiopian Army, which arrived late that morning.

After Ethiopian forces and allied militias took control of the city on 10 November, Amhara militants and special forces began to attack Tigrayans in waves of revenge killings in the following days.

A Tigrayan student interviewed by the Financial Times after fleeing to Sudan, Abrahaley Menasew, had a head wound that he attributed to Amhara militias attacking him in Mai Kadra. Abrahaley stated that his head had been hit by an axe, that his "neck and wrist were slashed with a machete . . . and he almost lost his hand." He stated that the militia members "discussed whether to kill [him] or take [him] with them" before attacking him and believing him to be dead. Abrahaley stated that his Amhara friends had informed the militias of his location because of his Tigrayan ethnicity.

Twelve Tigrayan refugees interviewed by Associated Press stated that they had been attacked by both Amhara militias and the ENDF.

Messah Geidi, a refugee from Mai Kadra, attributed the killings to the ENDF, stating, "the army slaughtered the young people like sheep".

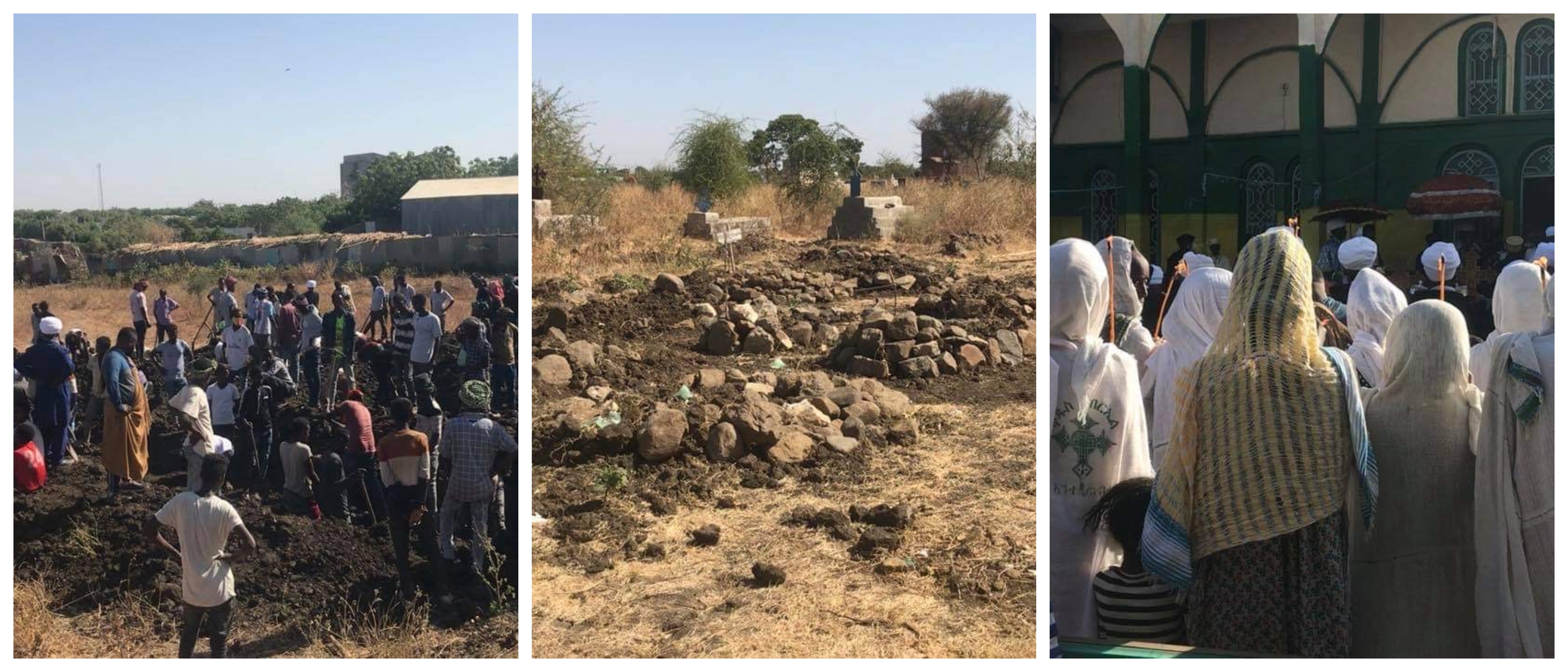
Mass graves (center), and funeral services (left and right) for the victims

=== Casualties ===
According to Amnesty, "scores", likely hundreds, were killed. Local media reported at least 500 fatalities. While the EHRC was unable to independently confirm death tolls, local funeral committees estimated at least 600 people had been killed, taking three days to be buried in mass graves, and that this number did not include people who had been killed in the outlying areas and had yet be buried. Victims were being treated in hospital as far away as Gonder. While most victims were men, several women had "suffered physical and mental injuries". EHRCO estimated 1100 deaths based on its own observations and data collection during 3–11 December 2020 visit. A special report by Reuters confirmed that at least 767 people were killed during the massacre.

== Aftermath ==
On 9 February 2021, the office of the United Nations High Commissioner for Refugees said that the fighting in Ethiopia had prompted more than 60,000 people to flee into Sudan. 36% of the refugees were female, 31% were children, and 5% were elderly (over 60). Amnesty International Director for East and Southern Africa, Deprose Muchena, urged the government to restore all communications to Tigray as an act of accountability and transparency for its military operations in the region and allow unfettered access to humanitarian organizations and human rights monitors.

The Ethiopian government, which has repeatedly offered to shelter refugees internally, has suggested that reports from Sudan may be disinformation propagated by perpetrators posing as victims, similar to ethnic Hutus who fled the country following the Rwandan genocide, including the Interahamwe who perpetrated the genocide. The Ethiopian Prime Minister Abiy Ahmed claimed that the refugees in Sudan who shared their accounts of the conflict consisted of only young men with no women or children present, and suggested that the men could be the perpetrators of atrocities. In early December 2020, the federal government refused to allow independent international investigations to be conducted by humans rights bodies, claiming that to assume that the government could not investigate the events was "belittling the government" and that Ethiopia didn't "need a babysitter".

== Investigations ==
=== OHCHR and EHRC ===
OHCHR and EHRC investigators concluded that on 9 November 2020, a local Tigrayan youth group (Samri), the local administration, police, and other militias allied with the TPLF killed hundreds of Amhara civilians in Mai Kadra with axes and machetes in house-to-house raids focused on neighborhoods where mostly Amhara farmhands lived. On 10 November 2020, as the ENDF and ASF approached the town, most members of Samri, local police, and militia responsible for the killings, as well as Tigrayans who feared retaliation, fled across the border to Sudan. Once the ENDF and ASF captured Mai Kadra, Amhara militias killed at least five Tigrayans who remained in that town in retaliation. As many of those killed were undocumented seasonal laborers, investigators found it difficult to ascertain the number of victims, but more than 200 civilians were confirmed to have been killed.

=== EHRC and EHRCO ===
A group of investigators sent by the Ethiopian Human Rights Commission visited Mai Kadra to investigate the mass killings between 14 and 19 November 2020, as part of its investigations into human rights violations after reports of ethnic cleansing. Its preliminary findings were released on 24 November. The EHRC report found that a massacre of civilians did indeed take place on 9 November, by a Tigrayan youth group aided by the then local administration security forces. EHRC Chief Commissioner Daniel Bekele said:

The unimaginably atrocious crimes committed against civilians for no reason other than their ethnicity is heartbreaking. Yet we are consoled by the stories of Ethiopians who saw beyond ethnic origin to come to the aid of their compatriots in their time of need. These stories keep the hope of a return to peaceful coexistence going. It is now an urgent priority that victims are provided redress and rehabilitation, and that perpetrators involved directly or indirectly at all levels are held to account before the law". The EHRC stated that the evidence "strongly indicate[d] the commission of grave human rights violations which may amount to crimes against humanity and war crimes.

The Ethiopian Human Rights Council visited Mai Kadra and the surrounding regions during 3–11 December 2020. It drew similar conclusions to those of the EHRC, but estimated the number of victims as 1100 and clarified that the term Samri referred to the neighborhood where most of the youths directly responsible for the massacre were from.

=== Ethiopian Federal Police ===
In mid-December 2020, the Ethiopian Federal Police (EFP) detained Enkuayehu Mesele in a refugee camp and Tesfaye Kebede, Abadit Abrha and three others in Addis Ababa, on suspicion of involvement in the massacre. A military officer, Amanuel Belete, accused Enkuayehu of being the leader of the massacre. In late January, police spokesperson Zelalem Mengiste stated that police had investigated 117 burial sites and finalized investigations. The police issued 349 arrest warrants, among which 124 had been arrested. Agence de Presse Africaine reported Zelalem as stating that some of the suspects were defeated during the Tigray War.

== See also ==
- Chenna massacre
- Galikoma massacre
- Kombolcha massacre
- Kobo massacre
