= GUH =

GUH may refer to:

- Grange University Hospital, hospital in Cwmbran, Wales
- Guahibo language (ISO 639-3 code: guh), of Colombia and Venezuela
- Guh, Ethiopian village that was the site of the 2021 Guh massacre
- Gunnedah Airport (IATA code: GUH), small airport in New South Wales, Australia
- Guh (creature), a legendary creature from Alaska
