= EHRC =

EHRC may refer to:

- Equality and Human Rights Commission, public body responsible for promotion and enforcement of equality laws in Great Britain
- Ethiopian Human Rights Commission, public body responsible for promoting human rights and investigating human rights abuses in Ethiopia
