= Kobo massacre =

2021 Tigray War killings in Ethiopia

- Part of the Tigray War and TPLF invasion of the Amhara region
- Location: 12°11′51.07″N 39°45′9.29″E; Kobo, Ethiopia
- Date: 9 September 2021
- Attack type: Massacre
- Deaths: 600+ civilians
- Perpetrator: (Tigray Region) Tigray Defense Forces

The Kobo massacre was an extrajudicial killing event perpetrated in Kobo district and Kobo town in North Wollo Zone of the Amhara Region of Ethiopia during the Tigray War, on 9 September 2021.

== Massacre ==
Residents told VOA News that the TDF killed 600 civilians in Kobo in the Amhara Region. According to locals, TDF fighters entered villages in Kobo district on 9 September searching for weapons, but armed farmers attacked the soldiers in the villages. As TDF fighters fled from the villages to Kobo town, they indiscriminately killed men who were working their fields in retaliation.

Human Rights Watch (HRW) spoke to residents of Kobo town who witnessed 23 civilians summarily executed by the TDF in that town on 9 September in retaliation for attacks by farmers earlier that day.

A report by Al Jazeera described it as "the most extensive yet of one of the deadliest known killings of Amhara in the war."

Amnesty International published a report in which witnesses described retaliatory summary executions of over two dozen men and one woman in the town of Kobo. Spatiotemporal satellite imagery analysis corroborated witness testimony that new graves were dug at two church compounds in the town to bury those summarily executed.

The TDF has denied committing atrocities.

== Reactions ==
The Ethiopian Human Rights Commission expressed their concern regarding the incident on Twitter:

The Ethiopian Human Rights Commission (EHRC) is alarmed by disturbing reports it is receiving about allegations of deliberate attacks against civilians in Kobo town and surrounding rural towns by TPLF fighters including shelling on civilian areas, house to house search and killings, looting and destruction of civilian infrastructure. While EHRC continues with its investigation, it reiterates its repeated call on the obligation of all parties to the conflict to protect civilians at all times. — Ethiopian Human Rights Commission

== See also ==
- Casualties of the Tigray War
- Timeline of the Tigray War (July 2021–present)
