= February 2021 Kola Tembien massacre =

Massacre in Kola Tembien, Central Tigray as part of the Tigray war

Coordinates: 13.6211°N 38.8238°E

- Part of Tigray War
- Location of Kola Tembien in Tigray (Ethiopia)
- Location: Kola Tembien (Tigrinya: ቆላ ተምቤን), Tigray Region, Ethiopia
- Date: 10 February 2021
- Target: Tigrayans
- Attack type: Mass killing; Ethnic cleansing
- Deaths: 182 civilians
- Perpetrators: (Ethiopia) Ethiopian National Defence Force (Eritrea) Eritrean Defence Forces

The February 2021 Kola Tembien massacre was a mass extrajudicial killing that took place in Kola Tembien (Tigrinya: ቆላ ተምቤን) in the Tigray Region of Ethiopia during the Tigray War, on 10 February 2021. Kola Tembien is a district that belongs to the Central zone of Tigray.

== Massacre ==
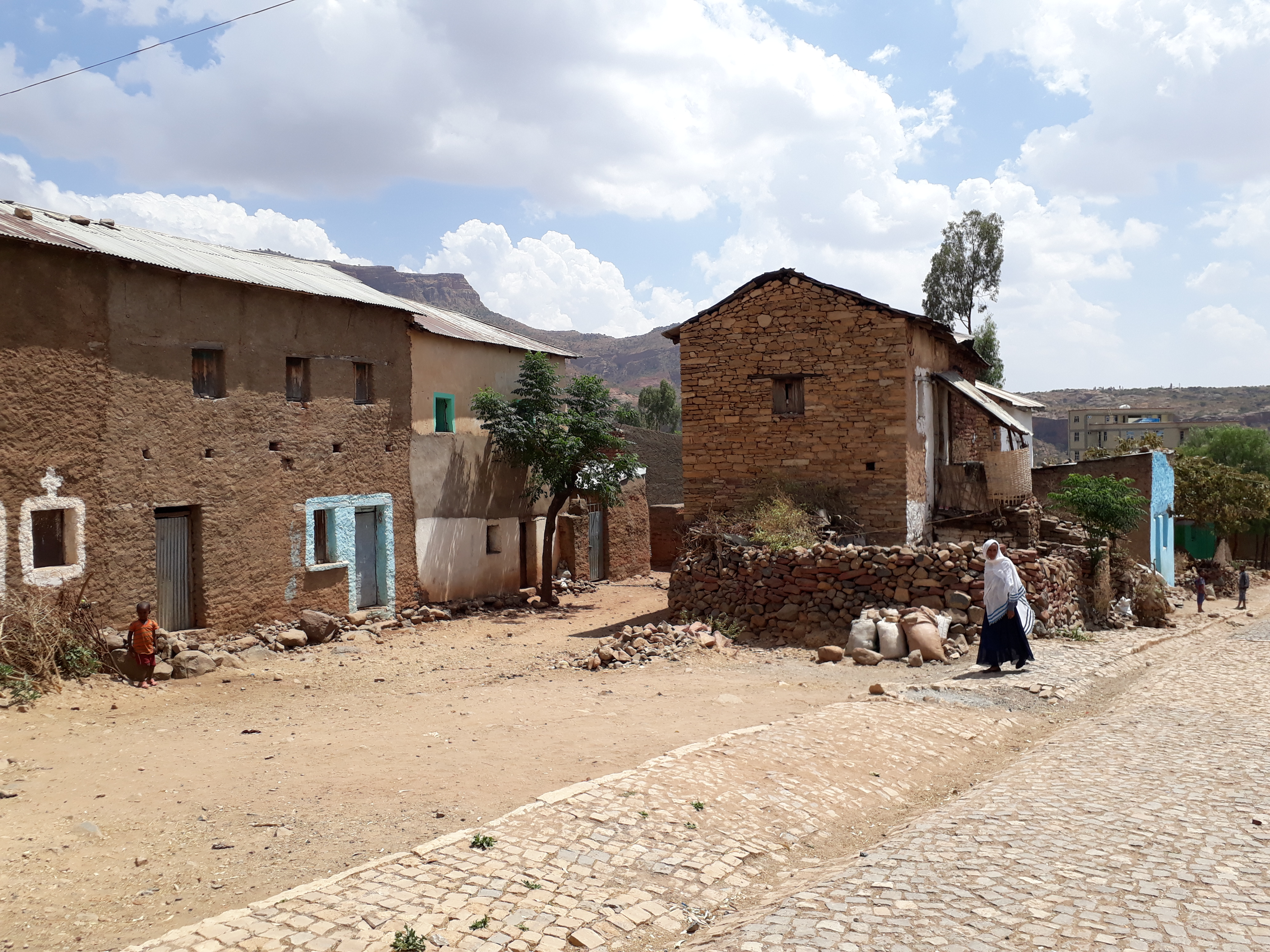
Partial view of Abiy Addi in Kola Tembien

The Ethiopian National Defense Force (ENDF) and Eritrean Defence Forces (EDF) killed dozens of civilians in a killing spree across villages in Kola Tembien (Central Tigray) on 10 February 2021.

[O]n February 10, all the terrors of Ethiopia’s civil war descended on the town and at least a dozen surrounding villages. (…) [C]ivilians, mainly farmers, had been massacred in Abiy Addi and the villages of Adi Asmiean, Bega Sheka, Adichilo, Amberswa, Wetlaqo, Semret, Guya, Zelakme, Arena, Mitsawerki, Yeqyer and Shilum Emni - villages about 60 miles from Tigray's capital. — Lucy Kassa, The Telegraph,

Typical massacres committed by Ethiopian and Eritrean soldiers in the Tigray war are (1) revenge when they lose a battle; (2) to terrorise and extract information about whereabouts of TPLF leaders; (3) murder of suspected family members of TDF fighters; and (4) terrorising the Tigray society as a whole such as in case of mass killings in churches. The Kola Tembien massacres were particularly a revenge for lost battles further west in the Jawmaro mountains, while terrorising the Tigrayan society at the same time.

== Perpetrators ==
The Telegraph reported the perpetrators as being Ethiopian and Eritrean soldiers.

== Victims ==
The Tigray: Atlas of the humanitarian situation mentions 122 victims, and The Telegraph 182, of which 18 have been identified.

== Reactions ==
Eritrea’s information minister, Yemane Gebremeskel, could not address this massacre specifically, but stated that the government of Eritrea has zero tolerance for and never targets civilians in war. ‘’The Telegraph’’ asked the Ethiopian Prime Minister’s office to comment but received no answer. The “Tigray: Atlas of the humanitarian situation”, that documented this massacre received international media attention, particularly regarding its Annex A, that lists massacres in the Tigray War.

After months of denial by the Ethiopian authorities that massacres occurred in Tigray, a joint investigation by OHCHR and the Ethiopian Human Rights Commission was announced in March 2021.
