= Amhara Association of America =

Non-profit Amhara nationalist organization based in the U.S

- የዐማራ ማህበር በአሜሪካ
- Abbreviation: AAA
- Formation: 2016
- Type: Nonprofit
- Headquarters: Charlotte, North Carolina, United States
- Leader: Tewodrose Tirfe
- Website: www.amharaamerica.org

The Amhara Association of America (AAA) (Amharic: የዐማራ ማህበር በአሜሪካ) is a non-profit Amhara nationalist organization based in Charlotte, North Carolina, focused on advocating for the human rights of the Amhara people in Ethiopia.

AAA is a non-profit 501(3)c organization with a stated mission to "end the suffering and sidelining of Amharas across Ethiopia" and its activities include conducting independent human rights investigations, collaborating and organizing with other Amhara civic organizations and engaging policy makers (e.g. U.S. Department of State), U.S. Congress members, international media agencies, and human rights organizations to inform them of human rights violations and humanitarian crises affecting the Amhara people of Ethiopia. AAA's prominence in advocacy work has shaped policy towards Ethiopia since at least 2017 when AAA Chairman Tewodrose Tirfe was an invited speaker at the 2017 U.S. House of Representatives Committee on Foreign Affairs hearing titled "Democracy Under Threat in Ethiopia". In 2022 AAA has been recognized as a widely published public voice and critic of Prime Minister Abiy Ahmed Ali, Oromia Regional President Shimelis Abdisa, Amhara Prosperity Party (formerly Amhara Democratic Party) and other government officials complicit in the Amhara genocide.

== Background ==
AAA was founded in Charlotte, North Carolina, US, in 2016. The AAA was founded during a turbulent time in Ethiopian history when nation-wide protests erupted against the TPLF-dominated EPRDF government which ruled the country from 1991 to 2018 committing extensive crimes against humanity. During this time, region-wide protests erupted across the Amhara Region especially in cities like Gonder, Bahir Dar and Woldia. Protestors called for an end to oppression, amendment to the racist Ethiopian constitution and recognition of the ethnic Amhara identity of the lands of Welkait, Raya, Metekel and Dera/Shewa. During this period, Ethiopian security forces killed scores of peaceful protestors in cities like Bahir Dar.

== Investigations ==
One of AAA's primary activities is producing independent investigative reports using its team of independent human rights researchers/experts on the ground in Ethiopia. AAA's team of investigators track and produce reports on human rights violations against Amhara people victim to war, genocidal violence and related violations.

Reports contain information related to incidents including number of victims affected (e.g. number killed, injured, displaced, raped, or jailed), their identities were possible (i.e. names, age, sex, location, etc.), geographical location(s) of incident and perpetrators of human rights violations. Common perpetrators include the Tigray People's Liberation Front (TPLF), Oromo Liberation Army (OLA), Gumuz militants and the Ethiopian Government and security forces.

=== 2024 ===
OLA (Oromo Liberation front) is still moving to Gida Woreda to start their movement.

=== 2022 ===
==== Mass crackdown against Amhara dissidents ====
In May 2022, the Prosperity Party intensified its campaign of mass arrests against Amhara dissidents including activists, journalists, opposition politicians and Fano patriots. On June 2, 2022, AAA issued an update listing names of over 100 high-profile detainees and stating that majority of the detainees were being held in detention sites in Nefas Mewcha and Were-Ilu without court oversight. On June 11, 2022, AAA issued an update that detainees in Nefas Mewcha staged a hunger strike to protest conditions.

Following TPLF's full-scale invasion of Amhara Region in late August 2022, mass arrests of journalists reintensified with several new arrests. On September 7, 2022, AAA made a social media post raising concern over arrests of journalists of Meaza Mohammed and Gobeze Sisay of Roha TV and Voice of Amhara, respectively. On September 10, 2022, AAA issued a social media post regarding the arrest of journalist Abay Zewdu of Amara Media Center. On September 11, 2022, AAA issued a social media post condemning the arrest of blogger, activist and author Assaye Derebe.

==== 24 July 2021 to 10 September 2022 War Crimes in Adarkay ====
On October 8, 2022, AAA released its report titled "War Crimes of TPLF in occupied Adarkay Woreda of Amhara Region". The report details war crimes committed by TPLF forces during its occupation of Adarkay Woreda in North Gonder Zone which faced one of the longest periods of occupation by invading TPLF forces. Following the third full-scale invasion of Amhara Region on August 23, 2022, fighting intensified between invading TPLF forces and allied Ethiopian forces until being pushed out of several kebeles in September 2022.

This provided an opportunity for AAA's team of human rights investigators to collect evidence of war crimes committed in the area however the report mentions challenges such as telecommunications disruptions. The report detailed at least 85 civilians were killed (included names of 70 victims), raped at least 100 women of all ages exposing at least 89 to unwanted pregnancies, displaced 86,866 residents and looted and destroyed public and private property.

==== 9 September 2022 Uke Kersa Massacre ====
On October 2, 2022, AAA released its report on the ethnic-based massacre of Amhara civilians in Uke Kersa town of Guto Gida Woreda (East Wollega Zone, Oromia Region). The report detailed the invasion of Uke Kersa town by OLA militants and the ensuing ethnic-based massacre of at least 35 Amhara civilians by the militants with the collaboration of local Qeerro. The report also included a list of 28 identified victims along with their sex and age. In addition to those killed, at least five Amharas were injured in the attack including an 80-year-old man. The report also detailed looting and destruction of property belonging to ethnic Amhara residents of the town.

==== August to September 2022 War Crimes in Raya Kobo ====
On September 24, 2022, AAA released a report on atrocities committed against Amhara civilians by TPLF forces in Raya Kobo Woreda in North Wollo Zone of Amhara Region. The report stated at least 53 Amhara civilians were killed by TPLF militants since the full-scale invasion of Raya Kobo on August 24, 2022. The report contained a list of 43 victims killed in various parts of Raya Kobo Woreda including Kobo, Aradom, Gobiye, Robit and surrounding towns. The victims were reportedly killed in various ways including by execution, shelling and in some cases when victims were used as human shields and killed in drone strikes. The report also detailed displacement of at least 12,777 residents from the town who were sheltered across 11 IDP shelters.

==== 29 August to 1 September 2022 Agamsa Massacre ====
On September 16, 2022, AAA released an investigative report titled "'They Stole Our Tears' - The Agamsa Massacre of Amharas: Victims branded Victimizers" on the massacre of 61 Amhara civilians by the OLA which took place between August 29 and September 1, 2022, in and around Agamsa town in Amuru Woreda of Horo Guduru Wollega Zone in Ethiopia's Oromia Region. The OLA backed by Oromo militias and radical local Oromo youth (Qeerro) went door-to-door seeking out ethnic Amhara residents in the area and systematically killed them using firearms and bladed weapons. In Agamsa town, at least 50 ethnic Amhara civilians were killed and an additional 20 were abducted on Monday, August 29, 2022, but an additional 11 Amhara civilians were killed in the surrounding area. Prior to the English version of the report being released, an earlier Amharic version was released on September 12, 2022.

==== 4 July 2022 Lemlem Massacre ====
On July 10, 2022, AAA released its investigative report "They attacked us for the simple reason of being Amhara" on the July 4, 2022, massacre of Amhara civilians in Menders (villages) 20 and 21 of Lemlem Kebele (Hawa Gelana Woreda, Qelem Wollega Zone, Oromia Region, Ethiopia) by the OLA. According to AAA's report, at least 308 Amhara civilians were killed, an additional 36 were injured, several others went missing, over 14,860 were displaced (from Menders 20 and 21 and surrounding villages) and property and homes were looted and destroyed. The investigation identified names of 178 of the (deceased) victims by name, sex and age, and included photographs of several mass burials.

According to the report, victims were selectively targeted by ethnic identity and residents who showed proof of their Oromo identity were spared. This incident occurred just weeks after the Tole massacre and the investigation revealed complicity by the Oromia Regional Government. Allegations for complicity include refusal by local security officials and the regional administration to answer the pleas of the victims and this implicated the Oromia Special Forces (OSF). In addition, telecommunications services were shut during the attack and afterwards which hindered efforts to investigate the incident.

==== June and July 2022 Arrests of Amhara Students ====
On July 9, 2022, AAA released an update on protests against the Amhara genocide held by Amhara students across university campuses in Addis Ababa and Amhara Region. According to the report, protests were held across various university campuses by students, teachers and community members against the devastating June 18, 2022, Tole massacre and the wider Amhara genocide. The report detailed peaceful rallies held between June 23 and 29, 2022 across various cities and university campuses including Gonder University, Bahir Dar University, Debre Markos University, Debre Birhan University, Woldia University and Addis Ababa University. There was also a protest held on June 27, 2022, in a high school in Shewa Robit, where security forces shot and killed at least 12 protesters and injured an additional 4.

In response to the protests, government security forces cracked down on the students and the investigation detailed mass arrests, killings, torture and other related human rights abuses. In many incidences, security forces fired at protesters killing and injuring many and in many cases arresting, intimidating and interrogating detainees. Among the targets were members and leaders of the Amhara Students Association (ASA). On August 8, 2022, AAA published a social media post raising concern over harassment, arbitrary arrest and suspension of over 13 Amhara students in Dire Dawa University as per the ASA.

==== 18 June 2022 Tole Massacre ====
On July 3, 2022, AAA released an interim report titled "It seems like the whole population is killed" on the June 18, 2022, massacre Amhara civilians in Tole Kebele (Gimbi Woreda, West Wollega Zone, Oromia Region) by the OLA and local Qerro vigilantes. According to the report, at least 554 Amhara civilians were killed (the report also stated that the actual death count could be in the thousands), an additional 40 were injured and hundreds went missing. The investigation identified 455 victims by name, sex and village of residence. The youngest victim was found to be a 15 day old infant and the oldest was a 100 year old elder.

=== 2021 ===
==== 1 January to 31 December 2021 Annual Report ====
On May 27, 2022, AAA released its 2021 annual report detailing human rights violations against Amhara people (non-exhaustive) across Ethiopia covering the period between January 1 to December 31, 2021. This document was described as a compendium of selected incident reports published throughout the year. During the reporting period the following abuses against Amhara civilians by state and nonstate actors were reported: 3,308 killed, 1,252 injured, 1,009 raped, 111 arbitrary arrests, 62 abduction cases and forced evictions impacting 1,517 people.

AAA also estimated at least 5 million Amhara people were displaced from their homes due to the violence in 2021 alone. The human rights violations documented in the report were primarily committed by the following perpetrators: the Tigray People's Liberation Front (TPLF), OLA, Gumuz militias, and Sheko militias. The incidents covered the Oromia, Benishangul-Gumuz, Amhara and SNNP Regions, as well as the nation's capital, Addis Ababa.

=== 2020 ===
==== 9 November 2020 Mai-Kadra massacre ====
On November 3, 2021, AAA released an investigative report on the November 9, 2020 Mai-Kadra massacre of Amhara civilians by TPLF and Samri vigilantes. The report was accompanied by a special documentary interviewing victims (survivors) and relatives of victims. The report included names of 1,515 Amhara victims who were killed in the massacre. making it the single worst atrocity of the Ethiopian war. The report also included photographs of the deceased victims and other photographs related to the massacre. The report includes context of the Mai-Kadra area, part of the Humera area (the Welkait Tegede Setit Humera Zone of Amhara Region) which was occupied by TPLF and annexed into the Tigray Region up until the outbreak of the war. Context is provided in the report regarding the oppressive policies which targeted Amhara residents of Mai-Kadra and the wider Welkait area.

== Sustainable peace in the Northern Ethiopia conflict ==
Since the outbreak of war in Ethiopia in early November 2020, the AAA has been engaged in calling for cessation of hostilities and peace. On July 1, 2022, AAA issued a statement on exclusionary negotiations taking place between the Prosperity Party and TPLF, titled "Sustainable Peace in Northern Ethiopia Requires an Inclusive Negotiation Process". This statement was issued following the Ethiopian Government designating a negotiations team to engage with the TPLF on June 27, 2022. This statement called for an end to the exclusion of Amhara people from the negotiations process and emphasized the illegitimacy of the Prosperity Party to negotiate on behalf of the Amhara people. Reasons stated included their complicity in Amhara Genocide, failure to protect citizens during TPLF and OLA's genocidal invasions of Amhara Region, and involvement in the mass crackdown of over 12,000 Amharas earlier in the year.

On August 18, 2022, AAA and 27 other Amhara civic organizations from across the global Amhara-Ethiopian diaspora issued a joint statement titled "Exclusion of Amharas from Peace Negotiation Process will not Bring Lasting Peace in Northern Ethiopia" addressed to international diplomatic envoys engaged in ending the conflict. On August 27, 2022, AAA Chairman Mr. Tewodrose Tirfe issued a brief statement raising alarm over the TPLF's full-scale invasion of Raya Kobo Woreda, North Wollo Zone (Amhara Region, Ethiopia). On September 13, 2022, AAA Chairman Mr. Tewodrose Tirfe issued a brief statement reiterating this sentiment but emphasizing that the peace-seeking process led by the African Union should be inclusive and not exclude the primary stakeholders in the conflict, the Amhara people.

== Mentions in prominent media publications ==
AAA has contributed to news publications such as Associated Press, The Economist, New York Times, Fox News, Al Jazeera, The Stream, TRT World, France 24, BBC, International Business Times, The Critic, Irish Times, The Africa Report The American Conservative, Queen City News, Le Devoir, DW (Amharic) and Oaklandside. AAA is a member and casualty recording organization of Every Casualty Counts.

AAA works to facilitate engagement between the Amhara-Ethiopian community and the international community including think tanks like The Heritage Foundation.
