= Axum massacre =

2020 massacre in Ethiopia, as part of the Tigray War

- Part of Tigray War
- Location of the massacre
- Location: Church of Our Lady Mary of Zion, Axum, Tigray Region, Ethiopia
- Date: 28 November and 15 December or 17–20 December 2020
- Target: Tigrayans
- Attack type: Massacre
- Deaths: minimum extrajudicial killings: 345 (HRW); 400 (Amnesty); 800 (AP)
- Perpetrator: (Eritrea) Eritrean Defence Forces (Note: Denied by the Eritrean government)

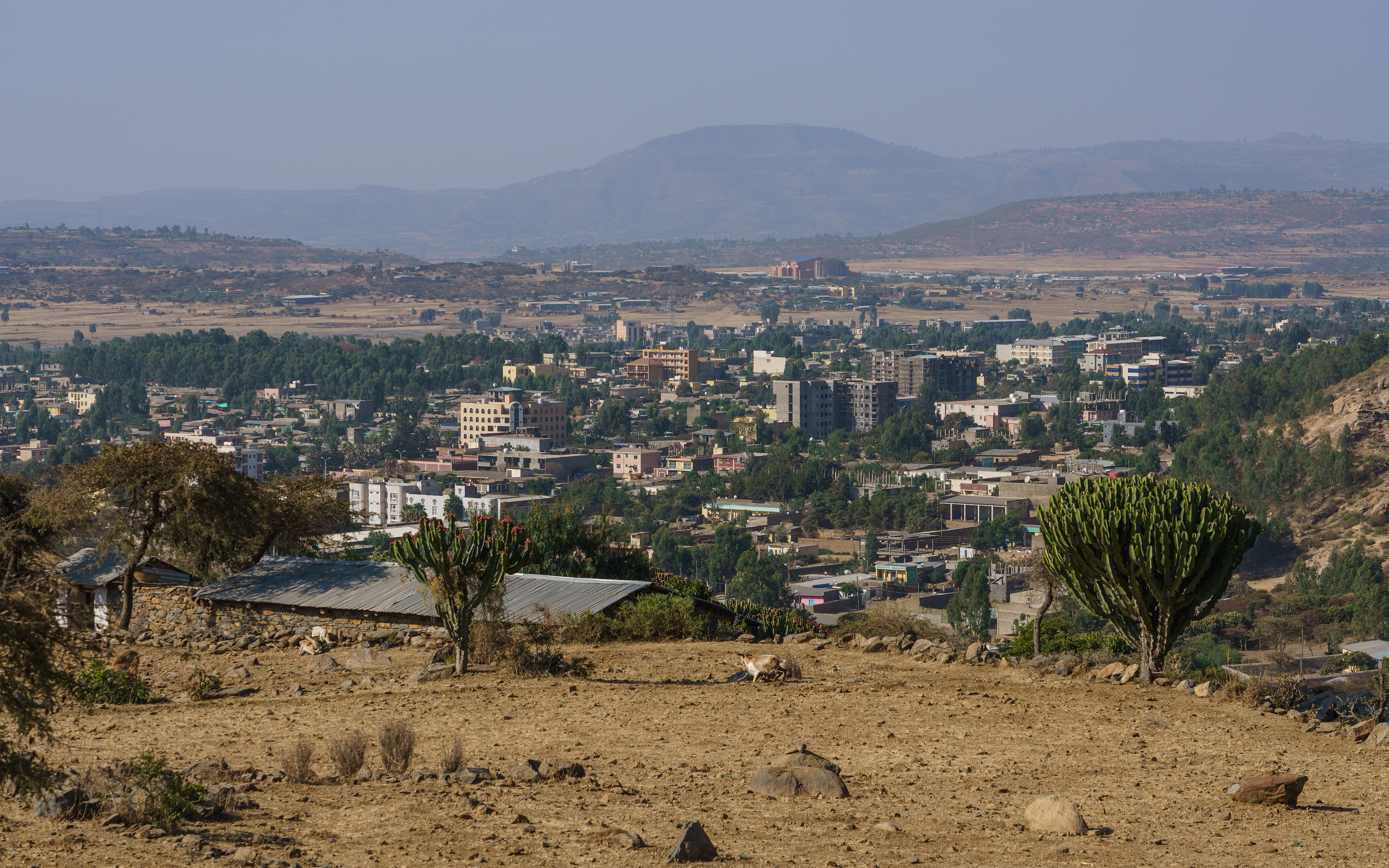
View on Axum before the massacre

The Axum massacre (alternatively spelled Aksum, also called the Maryam Ts'iyon massacre) was a massacre of about 100–800 civilians that took place in Axum during the Tigray War.

The main part of the massacre occurred on the afternoon and evening of 28 November 2020, continuing on 29 November, with smaller numbers of extrajudicial killings taking place earlier, starting from 19 November and during the weeks following the 28–29 November weekend. The massacre was attributed to the Eritrean Defence Forces (EDF) by Amnesty International, Associated Press, the Ethiopian Human Rights Commission (EHRC), Human Rights Watch (HRW) and Adigrat University lecturer Getu Mak.

The main massacre consisted of killings by shooting by the EDF throughout Axum. The bodies were brought to churches, including the Church of Our Lady Mary of Zion (Maryam Ts'iyon), for burial. Killings are also alleged to have previously taken place within the church. Due to a tight communication blockade, news of the massacre was only revealed internationally in early January 2021 after survivors escaped to safe locations. The EHRC visited Axum from 27 February to 5 March 2021.

== Before 18 November ==
Pro-federal-government sources said that the Ethiopian National Defense Force (ENDF) gained control of Axum Airport on 11 November 2020.

== Arrival of ENDF and EDF in Axum ==
=== 18 November ===
Heavy shelling of Axum and the cutting of transport and communication links in Axum started on 18 November according to the Ethiopian Human Rights Commission (EHRC). There were MiG airstrikes, tank attacks and artillery shells fired into the mountains around Axum and the town. Local administration and Tigrayan Special Forces withdrew.

=== 19–27 November ===
Debretsion Gebremichael, head of the Tigray People's Liberation Front in power in the Tigray Region prior to the Tigray War, stated on 19 November that fighting was taking place in the town of Axum itself, but that the TPLF was still in control of the town. The ENDF said it took full control of Axum the following day. On 22 November, images, video and text showing that the TPLF had damaged Axum Airport runway were published. The TPLF said it was not true. BBC News satellite image analysis suggested that the damage occurred between 19 and 23 November. On 29 November, Debretsion said that the TPLF had retaken control of Axum.

The EHRC stated that the ENDF and the Eritrean Defence Forces (EDF) entered Axum on 19 November. Starting that day, some ENDF and EDF members looted Saint Mary Hospital and Axum Referral Hospital and destroyed equipment that they did not loot. The COVID-19 wing of Axum Referral Hospital was looted by the ENDF and EDF. From 18 to 20 November, 41 people died in the two hospitals as a result of "physical injuries, blood loss and the lack of adequate medical treatment"; and 126 people had "medium to heavy physical injuries".

Amnesty International stated that extrajudicial killings started in Axum on 19 November. A witness interviewed by Martin Plaut stated that after the EDF entered Axum, EDF soldiers immediately shot the few people who were on the streets. Residents were later able to exit their houses, but were then victims of theft and forced to help in looting. The EDF executed about seven to ten residents per day.

Getu Mak, a lecturer from Adigrat University, was three weeks into a four-week high-school pupil software training workshop in Axum when the 4 November Northern Command attacks occurred. Getu dated the first day of shelling as 19 November 2020, starting at 14h00. Many residents fled and some sought shelter and slept at the Maryam Ts'iyon church. According to Getu, the EDF left Axum, continuing to Adwa, while the ENDF destroyed the Brana Hotel, an international luxury hotel. The EHRC stated that Ethiopian troops left Axum on 25 November.

== Massacre ==
The EDF returned to Axum on 26 November in trucks with Eritrean markings. After a while they left the city and went to the Mai Koho mountain and a checkpoint on the Shire side of the city. About 50–80 Eritrean soldiers once again entered the city the next day on 27 November. They began major looting of shops throughout the city and broke into entire hotels, jewellery shops, boutiques, etc. Two flour factories were also destroyed. On the evening of the same day, some Tigray militiamen arrived and stayed at the Yeha Hotel.

The next day on 28 November, from about 06:30 or 07:00, the pro-TPLF Tigray militia, armed with rifles, and supported by some of the residents, attacked the EDF stationed near the TV transmitter on Mai Koho mountain immediately east of the Church of Our Lady Mary of Zion (Maryam Ts'iyon). At 17:00, the Tigray militia was just about to finish the Eritreans off when another division of about 2,000 EDF troops arrived. They came from Adwa and were sent to support the EDF troops in Axum. Their arrival forced the militiamen to flee and drop their weapons. The militia said they killed about 40 – 45 Eritrean soldiers.

Two thousand more Eritrean soldiers had arrived by 17:00. They started firing indiscriminately on a massive scale against the civilian residents of Axum. A witness quoted by Libération dated the arrival of Eritrean soldiers to 26 November and stated that the main indiscriminate, mass shooting in the streets of Axum occurred on 28 November. A deacon at Maryam Ts'iyon church, interviewed by Associated Press (AP), also dated the main massacre, both in the church and on the street, to 28 November, and accused the EDF of being the perpetrators. The Tigray militia fled when the EDF reinforcements arrived. The shooting of civilians by the EDF continued "all night". Two Amnesty International witnesses estimated the start time of the massacre as 14:00 and 16:00.

The witness quoted by Martin Plaut stated that Eritrean soldiers asked "Why did you fight us? OK, now you have it!". Plaut interpreted the EDF's motivation for the massacre as revenge for the fight with the Tigray militia.

On 29 November, the Eritreans went from house to house, looting and murdering two hundred youths and suspected militia members. Shooting at the Maryam Ts'iyon church took place on 29 November according to Plaut's witness.

The EHRC gave a similar report as the weekend of the 28–29 November as being the dates of the main massacre, estimating a lower limit to the number of civilian victims for which it had "gathered evidence" as "more than one hundred", and attributing the killings of the weekend to the EDF.

On 30 November, Plaut's witness was in the church. Government representatives and federal police arrived by helicopter. The police convinced the Eritreans to allow residents to pick up the corpses. The witness estimates 300–400 "young people" were buried during the day time of 30 November 2020, and more in the evening.

Woinishet, born in Axum and based in the US, visited Axum during the events, and later escaped to Addis Ababa. Her interview was published in English on 20 January 2021. According to Woinishet, on an unspecified date after the Tigray War started, two thousand Eritrean Defence Forces (EDF) soldiers entered Axum in tanks and carried out a massacre, firing indiscriminately without warnings. The witness stated that "the entire city from the bus station to the park was covered in bodies". She stated that the Eritrean soldiers said that they had been ordered to kill all Tigrayan males older than four. The Eritreans, according to Woinishet, killed soldiers, priests and farmers, burned crops and ordered farmers to kill their livestock.

Woinishet states that Eritrean soldiers were completely in charge of the situation in Aksum and that Ethiopian soldiers watched and did nothing to stop the violence and the killing. The Ethiopian soldiers were fired at if they tried to stop Eritrean soldiers who were looting.

=== Location and numbers ===
Getu Mak attributed the role of the Maryam Ts'iyon church as being the place where 720 corpses were buried, without specifying the date of burial. He stated that "hundreds" of youths and militia members were extrajudicially executed in the 29 November house-to-house EDF raids.

The witness quoted by Libération stated that after the 29 November house-to-house looting and executions occurred, residents were forbidden from burying the corpses for three days. The witness later helped to carry 300–400 bodies to be buried. The church deacon who talked to AP confirmed that the killings by the EDF continued after the initial massacre. On the day he talked to AP in early February 2021, the deacon buried three victims of the killings. The deacon estimated 800 civilians executed on the weekend of 28 November, and "thousands" in total.

A witness who spent two months "going from village to village on foot" around the Tembien and Naeder Adet areas stated in Ethiopia Insight that some of the killings were done by Eritrean soldiers who killed people in their homes. According to the witness, a priest from Maryam Ts'iyon church stated that on one particular day, 243 victims had been buried, and that people who tried to pick up corpses were shot.

Amnesty International compiled a list of the names of "well over 200" people killed on 28 and 29 November and known personally by the witnesses and survivors interviewed. Four different men who helped to transport cartloads of bodies to churches reported carrying 45, 30, 21–40 and 50 bodies. One witness estimated seeing 400 bodies on 30 November.

In its preliminary report based on its 27 February to 5 March 2021 visit to Axum, the EHRC said that it had evidence for over a hundred victims.

On 19 March 2021, in a video by Channel 4 News posted on Channel4.com, Jamal Osman promised to present a report on the Axum massacre. He estimated a lower number of casualties than those in other reports, stating, "The international community talked about, [what] had happened in Axum, where 43 people were killed. We also met relatives of the victims who were killed there."

A priest, Wolde Mariam, also detailed the Axum Massacre, horrified about the ~800 people he said had been killed.

Axum massacre death counts
Source	19–27 Nov	28–29 Nov	30 Nov–late January	15 December	undated	total
Getu Mak			1–3 per day			720
Libération					300–400 (carried by one witness)	
AP		800				"thousands"
Ethiopia Insight					243 (buried on one day)	
Channel 4					43	
Amnesty International	21	"well over 200" killed	one witness saw 400 bodies on 30 Nov			
Human Rights Watch (HRW)	145 (Nov, excluding 28–29 Nov)	over 200				over 345
Ethiopian Human Rights Commission (EHRC)		over 100				

== Looting ==
The EDF looted Axum "systematically and on a massive scale, leaving residents without food or drink", medicine and cars. The looting started on 19 November, and intensified after the 28–29 November massacre.

=== Cultural heritage risks ===
Historians and archeologists expressed concern that the church architecture and the reputedly present Ark of the Covenant, significant in the history of Christianity, were at risk of damage or destruction.

== Perpetrators and order of command ==
Amnesty International, on the basis of interviews with 41 survivors and witnesses, 20 others with "knowledge relevant to the situation", and satellite imagery from October, November and December 2020 for cross-checking, attributed the massacre to the EDF in its 26 February 2021 report. Earlier, EDF troops were attributed as the perpetrators of the church and street massacres by Associated Press (AP), Getu Mak, and Martin Plaut's witness. The ENDF was attributed responsibility in early January reports by EEPA, and Le Monde.

The EHRC, based on its visit to Axum from 27 February to 5 March 2021, in which it conducted interviews with "survivors, 45 families of victims, eyewitnesses and religious leaders", held a group discussion with 20 residents, talks with local kebele officials, and discussions with medical staff of the Saint Mary and Axum Referral Hospitals, attributed the 28–29 November weekend massacre to the EDF.

Getu Mak attributed responsibility for delayed burial to the EDF, stating, "I saw a horse cart carrying around 20 bodies to the church, but Eritrean soldiers stopped them and told people to throw them back on the street."

Mhretab, interviewed by AP, stated that ENDF soldiers observed the massacre without intervening. When asked why they were failing to stop the massacre, they stated that they had orders "from above", which AP interpreted to mean that senior federal Ethiopian officials were responsible for the non-intervention order.

=== Motivation ===
Plaut interpreted the motivation for the massacre to be revenge for the fight between a Tigray militia and the EDF during the day of 28 November.

EDF soldiers stated that the 28–29 November massacre was done to frighten the population and discourage repeats of the 28 November attack against them by the Tigray militia. Statements included, "If you have a gun, give us, if not, we will continue this massacre" and "If you keep following the TPLF and try to fight us again we will kill you and we will do the same as yesterday."

== Reporting and evidence ==
=== Slow communication and early reports ===
With a ban on journalists entering the Tigray Region continuing as of 11 January 2021, news of the massacre was first provided by survivors arriving in Mekelle after walking by foot about 200 kilometres (120 mi). In early January 2021, Europe External Programme with Africa (EEPA) dated the massacre to 15 December. In its January reports, EEPA attributed the massacre to the ENDF and Amhara militia and located the main massacre to the square around the church. EEPA's early report stated, "More detail has been released on the massacre at the Maryam Zion Church in Aksum. On Tuesday, 15th of December, Ethiopian federal troops and Amhara militia approached the Maryam Zion Cathedral in Aksum. The church was full, and 1,000 people may have been in the building or the compound surrounding it. A confrontation happened after which people were forced to come out on the square. The troops opened fire and 750 people are reported to have been killed." Plaut's early report was similar, stating, "As the crowd milled around, there was further shouting and the troops opened fire on the protesting crowd. As many as 750 people are reported to have been killed." The initial attribution was to the ENDF and Amhara militia, not the EDF.

In late January, Laurie Nathan of the University of Notre Dame's Kroc Institute for International Peace Studies called the reports "credible, though unverified." Nathan said that the details were not clear, and would not be, until the United Nations or a human rights NGO safely entered the area and conducted an investigation.

=== Evidence and witnesses ===
Amnesty stated that the massacre could "amount to crimes against humanity" by the EDF. Eritrean human rights campaigners, such as Vanessa Tsehaye, have contributed to the Amnesty International report titled "Ethiopia: The Massacre in Axum".

Human Rights Watch (HRW) published a report on the massacre on 5 March 2021, based on interviews with 28 witnesses and survivors and the analysis of videos. HRW attributed the massacre to the EDF and called for an independent investigation into "war crimes and possible crimes against humanity". HRW's evidence for attributing the massacre to the EDF was based on the Eritrean licence plates of the perpetrators' vehicles, the dialect of Tigrinya spoken by the perpetrators, and their uniforms and characteristic footwear.

The EHRC published its preliminary report on 23 March 2021. The report was based on its visit to Axum from 27 February to 5 March 2021, in which it carried out extensive interviews with survivors, victims' families, eyewitnesses, local residents and officials and medical staff. The EHRC agreed with Amnesty International and HRW that the massacre could amount to crimes against humanity by the EDF.

On 3 October 2021, Tigrai TV broadcast a memorial ceremony for the Aksum victims as well as testimonies of relatives and witnesses.

== Reactions ==
=== Ethiopia ===
On 3 March 2021, the Ethiopian government declared there were "credible allegations of atrocities and human rights abuses" in Axum and other localities in Tigray and that it would both conduct its own investigation and allow an investigation by the UN. Journalists would not be blocked, but they would travel in the region at their own risk. On 11 May 2021, the Ethiopian Attorney General revealed the contents of a federal investigation conducted on 3 May.

Field Marshal Birhanu Jula, Chief of the General Staff of the Ethiopian National Defense Force (ENDF) later said in an interview that "there was damage, but what was said wasn't the kind that was portrayed for media consumption." He stated that "the Eritrean soldiers were attacked within the city, and when they retaliated, there were civilian casualties due to the dense population in the area."

=== Eritrea ===
==== Government ====
The Eritrean authorities rejected the statement of a massacre occurring in Axum's St. Mary of Zion Church, deeming it a "fabrication". The Eritrean government also rejected the accusations of targeted civilians and churchgoers. The BBC reached out to Eritrea's ministry of information, with Minister Yemane G. Meskel labeling "the accusations as 'preposterous' and 'fabricated'".

==== Citizens and diaspora ====
Eritreans in the international community questioned the Amnesty report for having 41 witnesses, who, according to these Eritreans, are of suspicious repute. Sara Isaias writes, "In a report that spanned over 25 pages, Amnesty went into quite some detail about killings that were supposed to have happened a day or two before the holiest of days in the Orthodox calendar... without providing a shred of tangible evidence. The entire report was based on anonymous and unsubstantiated sources.". They call for a third-party independent investigation into the alleged event, so as to prevent the 41 witnesses potentially being affiliated with the Tigray People's Liberation Front.

The Eritrean diaspora has raised criticisms in the validity of reporting around the alleged massacre, citing inconsistencies between media sources. For instance, inconsistencies were found regarding one particular victim who had in one article said she was maimed and raped by an ENDF soldier with Eritrean soldiers rescuing her. A BBC report highlights, "On 3 December, the teenager said that a soldier, dressed in an Ethiopian military uniform, entered their house demanding to know where the Tigrayan fighters were...They said the Eritreans had tended to their wounds".

Conversely, in another article by Al Jazeera, a video was posted with the same victim alleging that Eritrean soldiers had raped and maimed her. These two allegations were reported one day apart from another. Members of the UK Eritrean diaspora have assembled a Change.org Petition: "Peace Loving Eritreans in the UK are sending a message to BBC Tigrinya to stop the fake news". As of March 2021, the petition by Rahel Weldeab has 6,649 signatures.

=== Poland ===
On 22 January 2021, in response to the massacre, the Polish Foreign Ministry stated, "We strongly condemn the perpetrators of this barbaric crime committed in a place of worship. We expect the Ethiopian authorities to immediately take all possible measures to clarify its circumstances and punish the perpetrators."

=== United Kingdom ===
In early January 2021, British member of parliament David Alton informed the British Foreign Secretary about reports of the massacre and tabled a question in parliament.

=== United States ===
Catholic News Agency brought attention to the EEPA reports in the US in late January 2021.

== See also ==
- Amhara genocide
- Gimbi massacre
- Metekel conflict
- Mai Kadra massacre
