= Galikoma massacre =

2021 massacre in Galikoma as part of the Tigray War

Coordinates: 12.2173°N 40.0819°E

- Part of Tigray War
- Location of Galikoma in Ethiopia
- Location: Galikoma, Afar Region, Ethiopia
- Date: 5 August 2021
- Target: Afar people
- Attack type: Indiscriminate killing
- Deaths: 107-200 civilians
- Injuries: 35-46 civilians
- Perpetrator: (Tigray Region) Tigray Defense Forces

The Galikoma massacre was an indiscriminate killing of civilians perpetrated by the Tigray Defense Forces (TDF) in the village of Galikoma (or Galicoma) in the Afar Region of Ethiopia during the Tigray War, on 5 August 2021. Galikoma is a village in the Gulina district of Fanti zone in Afar Region.

== Massacre ==
An Ethiopian Human Rights Commission investigation found that on the morning of 5 August 2021, the TDF indiscriminately killed 107 civilians, including 27 children, and injured 35 civilians during an offensive in Galikoma. Civilians were assaulted by artillery and gunfire. According to Afar regional authorities, more than 200 civilians, including 107 children, were killed by the TDF. Survivors told hospital officials that they were shot by TDF fighters.

== See also ==
- Murders and massacres in the Tigray War
- Timeline of the Tigray War (July 2021-present)
