= Chenna massacre =

2021 extrajudicial killing in Ethiopia, as part of the Tigray War

Coordinates: 13.095631°N 37.609675°E

- Part of the Tigray War and TPLF invasion of the Amhara region
- Location of Chenna Teklehaymanot in Ethiopia
- Location: Chenna Teklehaymanot, Amhara Region, Ethiopia
- Date: 31 August – 4 September 2021
- Attack type: Massacre
- Deaths: 120–200 civilians
- Perpetrator: (Tigray Region) Tigray Defense Forces

The Chenna massacre was a mass extrajudicial killing perpetrated by the Tigray Defense Forces (TDF) in and around the village of Chenna Teklehaymanot in the Amhara Region of Ethiopia during the Tigray War, between 31 August and 4 September 2021.

The village is about 10 kilometres (6 mi) north-west of the town of Dabat in the North Gondar Zone of Amhara Region.

== Massacre ==
Between 31 August and 4 September, the TDF occupied the village of Chenna Teklehaymanot in Dabat district in the Amhara Region. Amhara regional authorities reported that the TDF killed 120-200 civilians during the occupation. Doctors at the nearest hospital placed the death toll at 125 and counting.

According to residents, TDF soldiers arrived demanding food, then killed those who resisted when fighters slaughtered their animals and looted their properties. Associated Press found many unburied corpses at the scene, some in military clothing. At least 30 women and girls were raped and sexually assaulted by TDF soldiers in and around Chenna during the occupation.

Human Rights Watch (HRW) spoke to residents who witnessed 26 civilians summarily executed by TDF fighters in Chenna. Witnesses also accused the TDF of entering residential areas without allowing civilians to leave and then shooting at Ethiopian National Defense Force (ENDF) positions, effectively utilizing the local population as human shields. HRW was provided a list of names of 74 civilians who were said to have died as a result of the TDF occupation.

An Ethiopian Human Rights Commission investigation found that at least 47 civilians were extrajudicially killed by the TDF in Chenna, some with their hands tied behind their backs.

The TDF has denied the massacre.

== See also ==
- Casualties of the Tigray War
- Timeline of the Tigray War – September 2021
