= Kobo (woreda) =

District in Amhara Region, Ethiopia

Kobo ራያ ቆቦ Raya Kobo
- Woreda
- Location within Ethiopia
- Coordinates: 12°08′N 39°39′E
- Country: Ethiopia
- Region: Amhara
- Zone: North Wollo Zone

Area
  - Total: 2,001.57 km^{2} (772.81 sq mi)

Population (2012 est.)
  - Total: 244,046
  - Density: 121.93/km^{2} (315.79/sq mi)

Kobo or Raya Kobo (Amharic: ራያ ቆቦ) is a woreda in the Amhara Region of Ethiopia. Located in the northeast corner of the North Wollo Zone, Kobo is bordered on the south by the Logiya River which separates it from Habru and Guba Lafto, on the west by Gidan, on the north by Tigray Region, and on the east by the Afar Region. Towns in Kobo include Gobiye, Kobo and Robit (Kobo Robit).

== Overview ==
The landscape of this district is characterized by a broad fertile plain that is separated from the lowlands of the Afar Region by the Zobil mountains, which are over 2000 meters high. In general, the altitude of Kobo ranges from 1100 meters on the plains to slightly more than 3000 meters above sea level along the border with Gidan. Kobo, as well as the other seven rural districts of this Zone, has been grouped amongst the 48 districts identified as the most drought prone and food insecure in the Amhara Region. To combat increasing droughts and improve crop yields, two irrigation projects have been undertaken in this district by the Commission for Sustainable Agriculture and Environmental Rehabilitation in the Amhara Region and the NGO Lutheran World Federation, affecting 302 hectares and benefiting 1,017 households.

The northern part of the Kobo district is traversed from west to southeast by the Hormat River. The river passes south of the Zobil Mountains.

The district Agriculture and Rural Development Office announced on 8 April 2007 that it was starting a program to improve the livelihood of district inhabitants, affecting 53,000 farmers. This would use 23.3 million birr of Regional funds to develop basin and degraded mountains, construct all-weather roads and irrigation diversion canals, improve springs as well as various "water harvesting structures". A similar program initiated a few years previously led to a decline in the number of farmers migrating to the Afar Region, Djibouti and Sudan.

In December 2008, construction on a 2.5 kilometer flood wall was completed, which would protect hundreds of hectares of farmland from frequent flooding by the Dikalla river.

== Timeline and history ==
Events are listed in a revers-chronological order.

=== Civilian deaths during the 2021 Tigray War ===
During the Tigray War, local residents reported that the Tigray Defense Forces (TDF) killed 600 civilians in Kobo on 9 September 2021.

During Tigray War on August the Tigray Defense Forces (TDF) captured Kobo and the Ethiopian National Defense Force has withdrawn. Both sides have confirmed it.

=== Air raids during the civil war of the 1980s ===
During the Ethiopian Civil War, the town of Gobiye in what is now the Kobo district, was bombed repeatedly by the Ethiopian Air Force:

- On 9 September 1989: 1 killed
- On 10 September 1989: 21 killed, 100 wounded (market day)

== Demographics ==
A 2012 estimate puts the population at 244,046. This gives a population density of 121.93 people per square kilometer (315.79 people per square mile), given its area of 2001.57 square kilometers (772.81 square miles), lower than the North Wollo Zone average of 134.66 people per square kilometer (348.76 people per square mile).

Based on the 2007 national census conducted by the Central Statistical Agency of Ethiopia (CSA), this district has a total population of 221,958, an increase of 26.43% over the 1994 census, of whom 111,605 are men and 110,353 women; 33,142 or 14.93% are urban inhabitants. With an area of 2,001.57 square kilometers, Kobo has a population density of 110.89 people per square kilometer (287.21 people per square mile), which is less than the Zone average of 123.25 people per square kilometer (319.22 people per square mile). A total of 54,466 households were counted in this district, resulting in an average of 4.08 persons to a household, and 52,108 housing units.

The 1994 national census reported a total population for this district of 175,558 in 37,031 households, of whom 87,636 were men and 87,922 were women; 28,706 or 16.35% of its population were urban dwellers.

The two largest ethnic groups reported in Kobo were the Amhara (98.63%), and the Tigrayan (1.26%); all other ethnic groups made up 0.11% of the population. Amharic was spoken as a first language by 98.45%, and Tigrinya was spoken by 1.47%; the remaining 0.08% spoke all other primary languages reported. The majority of the population in 1994 practiced Ethiopian Orthodox Christianity with 83.2% reported to profess this belief, while 16.72% of the population said they were Muslim. This remained largely stable through 2007, with 82.88% reporting Ethiopian Orthodox Christianity as their religion, while 16.5% of the population said they were Muslim.
