= Guh massacre =

Massacre in Guh, Eastern Tigray as part of Tigray War

Coordinates: 13.92232°N 39.34545°E

- Part of Tigray War
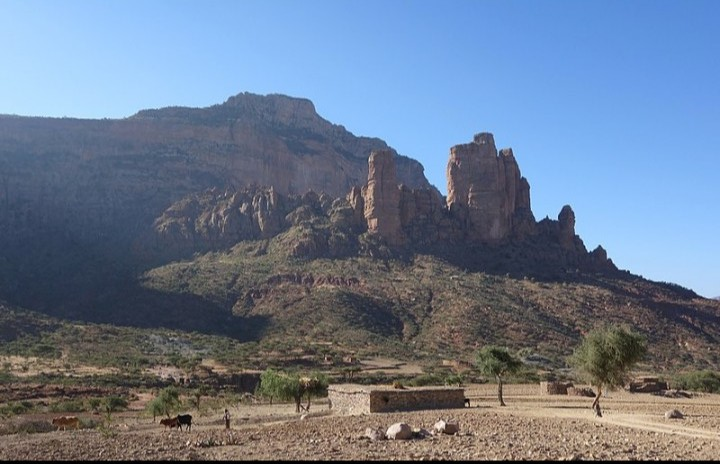
- Abuna Yemata Guh monolithic church

- Location of Guh in Tigray (Ethiopia)
- Location: Guh (Tigrinya: ጉሕ), Tigray Region, Ethiopia
- Date: 8 May 2021
- Target: Tigrayans
- Attack type: Mass killing; Ethnic cleansing
- Deaths: 19 civilians
- Perpetrator: (Eritrea) Eritrean Defence Forces

The Guh massacre was a mass extrajudicial killing that took place in Guh (Tigrinya: ጉሕ) in the Tigray Region of Ethiopia during the Tigray War, on 8 May 2021. Guh is a village that belongs to tabiya Debre Selam, woreda Hawzen, Eastern zone of Tigray. It is a small rural settlement on steep slopes below the fifth-century rock-hewn church of Abuna Yemata.

== Massacre ==
The Eritrean Defence Forces (EDF) killed 19 civilians in Guh (Eastern Tigray) on 8 May 2021. Most of the victims in the attack were women and young children.

According to the accounts, the casualties were from three families who had spent the night in their homes before setting out to hide with the men from the village during the day.

The scouts came at 8am to the small hamlet, which comprises only a handful of homesteads, and were suspicious of an unusually large store of edible crops, according to the testimony. The foodstuff was the produce of several households that had been gathered for safekeeping. The soldiers accused the villagers of being supporters of the TPLF insurgents and gathered them together in a field near a small river. One shot the two men in the group, aged 45 and 78, then others opened fire on the remainder. There are different reports of the number of attackers. A larger group of Eritrean soldiers who arrived after the shootings reprimanded the scouts responsible for the killings, according to one account.

When the male residents of the village returned after some hours in hiding, they found the dead and injured. An infant was among the dead and nine members of one family were killed, a list of the names suggests. — Jason Burke

== Perpetrators ==
The Guardian reported the perpetrators of this massacre as being Eritrean soldiers. Witnesses mention that one female Eritrean soldier was leading the massacre.

== Victims ==
The Guardian mentions 19 victims of this massacre, 16 of whom have been identified.

== Reactions ==
The Guardian stated that this additional report of a 'cold-blooded' killing of unarmed civilians, including young children, will add to 'international pressure' on Ethiopian authorities for a ceasefire to stem such abuses and allow humanitarian aid into Tigray.

After months of denial by the Ethiopian authorities that massacres occurred in Tigray, a joint investigation by OHCHR and the Ethiopian Human Rights Commission was announced in March 2021.

While the Ethiopian government promised that Eritrean troops would be pulled out of Tigray, the Eritrean government denies any participation in warfare or massacres in Tigray.
