= Dengelat massacre =

Massacre in Dengelat, Eastern Tigray as part of Tigray war

Coordinates: 14.18227°N 39.53054°E

Dengelat massacre Maryam Dengelat massacre
- Part of Tigray War
- Location of Dengelat in Tigray (Ethiopia)
- Location: Dengelat (Tigrinya: ደንገላት), Tigray Region, Ethiopia
- Date: 30 November 2020
- Target: Tigrayans
- Attack type: Mass killing; Ethnic cleansing
- Deaths: 80-150 civilians
- Perpetrator: (Eritrea) Eritrean Defence Forces

The Dengelat massacre (also called Maryam Dengelat massacre) was a mass extrajudicial killing that took place in Dengelat (Tigrinya: ደንገላት) in the Tigray Region of Ethiopia during the Tigray War, on 30 November 2020. Dengelat is a village that belongs to tabiya Beleso, woreda Sa’isi’e, Eastern zone of Tigray.

== Massacre ==
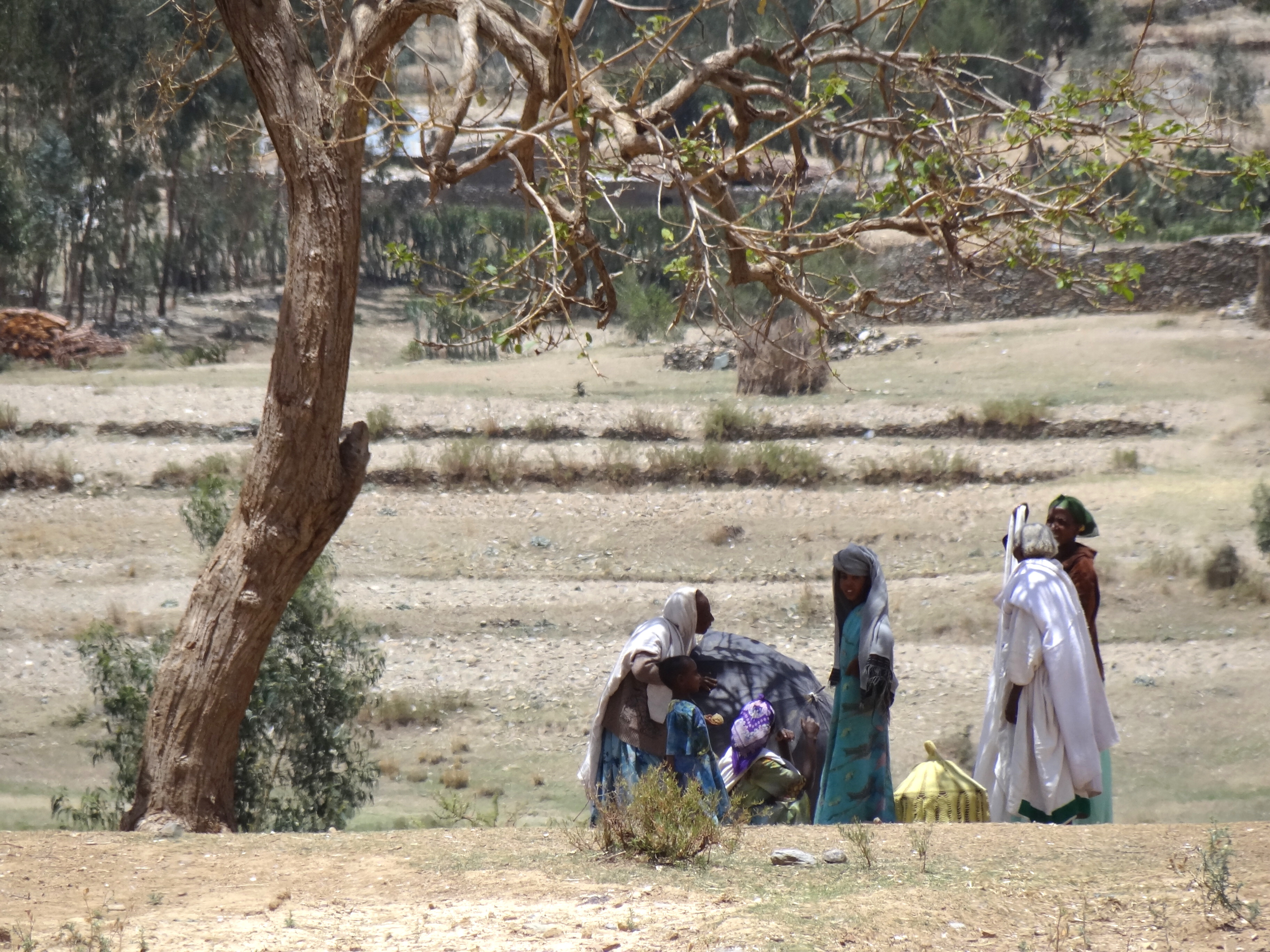
A peaceful rural scene near Dengelat, some years before the massacre

The Eritrean Defence Forces (EDF) killed hundred(s) of civilians in Dengelat (Eastern Tigray) on 30 November 2020; probably between 80 and 150 civilians, in the compound of Maryam Dengelat church 5 km south-west of Idaga Hamus, according to Nyssen. That day, there were many villagers in and around the church, who had been joined by religious pilgrims participating in the annual Orthodox ceremonies of Tsion Maryam. Eritrean soldiers opened fire on the church while hundreds of congregants were celebrating mass. People fled on foot; the troops followed, spraying the mountainside with bullets. Europe External Programme with Africa (EEPA) reported the number of executions by the EDF at the Maryam Dengelat church as 150, with an unknown date.

Typical massacres committed by Ethiopian and Eritrean soldiers in the Tigray war are (1) revenge when they lose a battle; (2) to terrorise and extract information about whereabouts of TPLF leaders; (3) murder of suspected family members of TDF fighters; and (4) terrorising the Tigray society as a whole such as in case of mass killings in churches. The Maryam Dengelat massacre includes all these characteristics.

== Perpetrators ==
Witnesses interpreted the identity of the perpetrators as Eritrean soldiers, by recognising marks on their cheeks, and recognising the typical Eritrean form of the Tigrinya language.

== Victims ==
Among the dead were priests, old men, women, entire families and a group of more than 20 Sunday school children, some as young as 14, according to eyewitnesses, parents and their teacher. The “Tigray: Atlas of the humanitarian situation” mentions approximately 100 victims. Local people claim that the number is way higher. Many victims are anonymous, as they were pilgrims coming from far away. 62 victims have been identified. The EHRC–OHCHR Tigray investigation reported the massacre in this locality, without going into further detail.

== Reactions ==
Four months later, after visiting the church and the village, CNN World brought a vivid description of the massacre.
