= Adigrat massacres =

Civilian killings in Ethiopia during the Tigray War

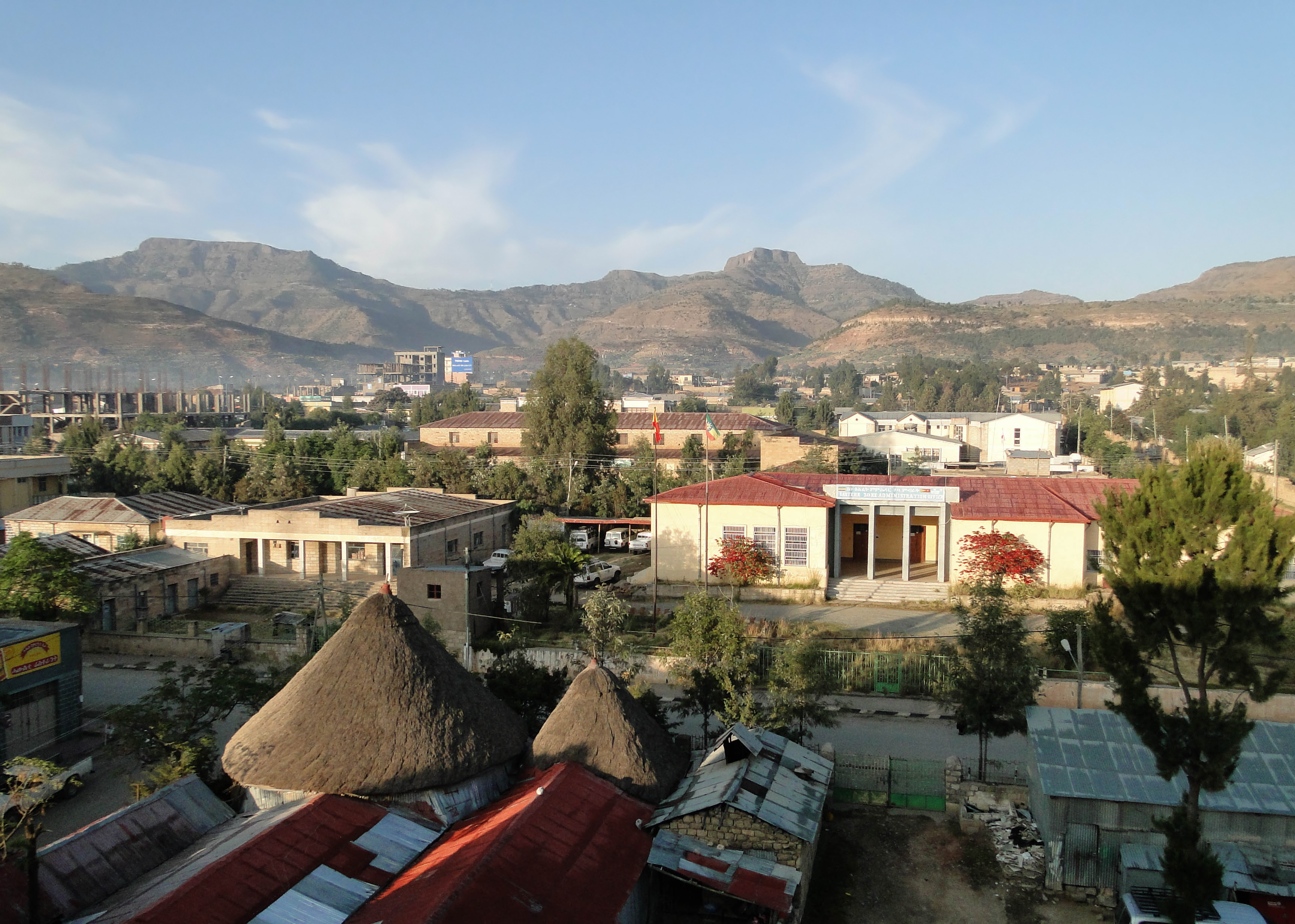
Adigrat before the Tigray War

The Adigrat massacres were mass extrajudicial killings by the Eritrean Defence Forces (EDF) that took place in and near Adigrat in the Tigray Region of Ethiopia during late 2020 during the Tigray War. These included 86 civilians killed in Zalambessa around 13 November 2020, 8–15 in Hawzen on 25 November, 80–150 at the Maryam Dengelat church near Idaga Hamus on 30 November.(more than thousand Tigreans massacred by Eritrean troops in Axum on 27 Nov 2020) (source: Adigrat massacres’ documentation).

== November ==
After shelling the town of Zalambessa on 13 November 2020, the EDF and ENDF killed 86 civilians, mostly during house-to-house searches.

On 21 November, shortly after capturing Idaga Hamus, the EDF executed 24 civilians.

After the EDF took control of Adigrat itself, the EDF took 12 civilian men to the edge of the town and executed them. Official Ethiopian federal sources said that the Ethiopian National Defense Force (ENDF) took control of Adigrat on 21 November.

On 25 November, the EDF executed 8–15 civilians after handcuffing them at the Addis Pharmaceutical Factory in Adigrat and 8 civilians in their houses in Hawzen.

On 30 November, the EDF killed between 80 and 150 civilians in the compound of Maryam Dengelat church 5 km south-west of Idaga Hamus, according to Nyssen. Europe External Programme with Africa (EEPA) reported the number of executions by the EDF at the Maryam Dengelat church as 150, with an unknown date.

== December ==
In late December, Zenebu, a witness from Hawzen interviewed by Associated Press, stated that she saw 70 bodies of people lying on the ground who she recognised. She stated that a 12-year-old boy in Hawzen had been killed by soldiers after carrying out errands for them. She attributed the killings to the ENDF, Amhara forces and the EDF. She identified EDF members as Eritrean based on cheek markings and their dialect of Tigrinya.

The EHRC–OHCHR Tigray investigation reported the massacres in this locality, without going into further detail.
