= Wukro massacres =

2020–2021 massacres in the Tigray War

- Part of the Tigray war
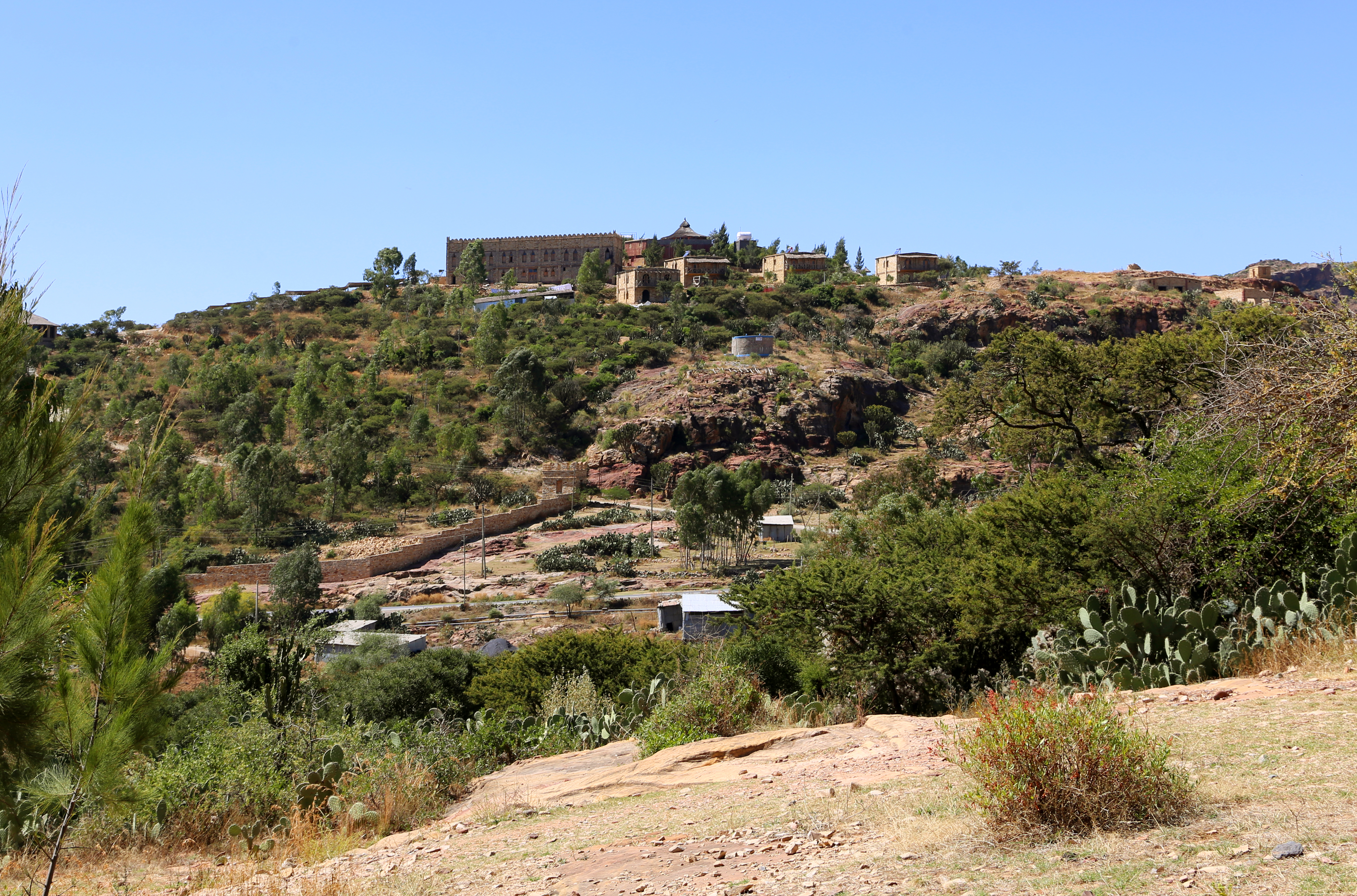
- Wide view of Wukro, November 2018

- Location of Wukro in Ethiopia
- Location: 13°47′N 39°36′E; Wukro (ዉቅሮ), Tigray Region, Ethiopia
- Date: 16 November 2020 – 14 March 2021
- Target: Tigrayans
- Attack type: Airstrike, Shooting, Mass killing
- Deaths: 267+
- Perpetrators: (Ethiopia) Ethiopian National Defence Force (Eritrea) Eritrean Defence Forces

During the Tigray war, the town of Wukro was damaged heavily, and was the scene of numerous killings and massacres committed by the Ethiopian National Defense Force (ENDF) and Eritrean Defence Forces (EDF). It was bombed in mid-November 2020, then shelled by artillery fire a few weeks later, resulting in heavy destruction of property and multiple civilian deaths. There was looting of public and private property, leaving shops empty and the local hospital destroyed. Occupying soldiers engaged in sexual violence, extrajudicial killings, and detention of civilians through at least March 2021. These massacres in Wukro received international attention in media articles.

== Attacks ==
=== 2020 ===
Ahead of the arrival of the ENDF and EDF in late November 2020, heavy bombing levelled homes and businesses in Wukro and sent plumes of dust and smoke rising above near-deserted streets on 16 and 25–27 November. As people hid in their houses, 14 civilians were killed in the bombing that involved the intervention of the Ethiopian Air Force (ETAF) and "Pterosaurus" drones, launched by the United Arab Emirates from its base in Assab in Eritrea. The Chinese-made, armed drones bombed Tigrayan towns and defence forces.

Upon arriving, the ENDF and EDF allegedly killed 220 civilians in Wukro on 27–28 November. Many residents responded by fleeing into nearby mountains; some recorded footage of the town's destruction on their cellphones. After that, EDF soldiers spent days looting homes, banks and factories, while also killing dozens of young men they suspected of sympathizing with Tigrayan rebel fighters. 81 of the victims are buried at the back of an Orthodox church in the town.

The ENDF and EDF were reported to have killed 12 more civilians on 30 December.

=== 2021 ===
On 10 February 2021, the EDF killed 18 people, most of whom were civilians protesting against their presence in the town. At least one of the 18 killed was a 15-year-old boy; his father stated that his son was not a protester, and was instead on his way to play volleyball when he was killed. On 14 March 2021, the ENDF reportedly killed more civilians; according to the Europe External Programme with Africa (EEPA), 5 civilians were shot, killing 3 of them. According to their neighbours, these killings were a retaliation for recent attacks by Tigray regional forces.

== Aftermath ==
The EHRC–OHCHR Tigray investigation reported that massacres happened in this locality, without going into further detail.

Factories in Wukro were still in a state of significant disrepair by late April 2023, with the EFFORT-owned Saba Stones and Sheba Leather being completely destroyed by the war.
