= Kobo, Ethiopia =

Kobo
- Location in Ethiopia
- Coordinates: 12°09′N 39°38′E
- Country: Ethiopia
- Region: Amhara Region
- Zone: Semien Wollo Zone
- Elevation: 1,468 m (4,816 ft)

Population (2007)
  - Total: 24,867
  - Estimate (2021): 53,307
- Time zone: UTC+3 (EAT)

Kobo (Amharic ቆቦ ) is a town in northern Ethiopia. Located in the Semien Wollo Zone of the Amhara Region, this town has a longitude and latitude of 12°09′N 39°38′E with an elevation of 1468 meters above sea level. It is the administrative center of Kobo woreda.

== History ==
From 1928 until 1930 there was a large revolt over taxes and central government control in the Raya area. The military and areal bombardment was used to regain central control. This marked the first use of air power in Ethiopia. Some of the local rebels were involved with attacking Ethiopian forces when the Italians invaded in 1936. In January 1942 a clash at Kobo between locals and soldiers collecting taxes led to three British officers and nine Ethiopian soldiers killed. The Ethiopian government responded with an aerial bombardment of the town. This skirmish was one of the events which lead up to the Woyane rebellion.

In mid-1972, a young District Development Officer, Abebaw Kasai, sent a full report concerning conditions in the district to the Ministry of Community Development; this was the first warning of what became the brutal 1973–74 famine which set off the Ethiopian Revolution and led to the fall of Emperor Haile Selassie. The report was received with interest by the Ministry of Community Development, but was rejected by the Ministry of the Interior. Abebaw was severely reprimanded and told never to send such a negative report again.

In May 1983 the Catholic Relief Services made grant distributions from the Agency for International Development at Kobo in response to the later famine, By the next year, with the famine clearly underway, several thousand Afar people had come to the Catholic mission in Kobo in search of help; they had fled the lowlands after losing all their livestock. Between 15 October and 2 November 1989 Kobo was subjected to four air attacks by the government forces. Casualties are not known, but the clinic was strafed by helicopter gunships.

In March 2007, the Amhara Regional Rehabilitation and Development Agency announced the creation of a state-owned cotton processing factory, and a cotton plantation on 305 hectares to supply it, with a capitalization of 63 million Birr. The next month the Ethiopian Catholic Church announced the completion of a modern hospital with 50 beds.

In September 2021, residents reported the Tigray Defence Forces killed 600 civilians in and near Kobo, starting on 9 September as a battle between the TDF and local militia but turned against civilians soon thereafter as TDF soldiers went door-to-door killing in retaliation.

== Demographics ==
Based on a national census conducted by the Central Statistical Agency in 2007, this town had a total population of 24,867, of whom 12,385 were male and 12,482 female.

The 1994 census reported this town had a total population of 20,788 of whom 9,761 were male and 11,027 female. The two largest ethnic groups reported in Kobo were the Amhara (94.54%), and the Tigrayan (4.94%); all other ethnic groups made up 0.52% of the population. Amharic was spoken as a first language by 95.55%, and Tigrinya was spoken by 4.03%; the remaining 0.42% spoke all other primary languages reported. The majority of the population practiced Ethiopian Orthodox Christianity with 87.15% reporting to profess this belief, while 12.34% of the population said they were Muslim.
