= Mai Kadra =

Town in Tigray Region, Ethiopia

May Kadra ማይ ካድራ
- Town
- Location in Tigray and Ethiopia May Kadra (Ethiopia)
- Coordinates: 14°04′12″N 36°34′03″E
- Country: Ethiopia
- Region: Tigray
- Zone: Mi'irabawi Zone
- Woreda: Kafta Humera
- Time zone: UTC+3 (EAT)

Mai Kadra (also spelled May Kadra; Tigrinya: ማይ ካድራ) is a town in Tigray Region, Ethiopia near the Sudanese border. Mai Kadra was the site of the deadliest massacre during the Tigray War.

== Overview ==
Mai Kadra is a market town on the Gonder–Humera road, in the Kafta Humera district of the Mi'irabawi (Western) Zone of the Tigray Region. Approximately 30 kilometers south of Humera, its population was estimated as 4,000 to 4,500. Prior to the Tigray War, migrant workers, mainly from the Amhara Region but also from a few other areas, would travel to Mai Kadra for seasonal work on large sesame and millet farms. These migrant laborers would arrive every September to help with the harvest.

== Mai Kadra massacre ==
On 9-10 November 2020, an ethnic massacre occurred in Mai Kadra in which hundreds of ethnic tigray civilians were killed.
