= Ethiopian Human Rights Commission =

Ethiopian national human rights institution

- የኢትዮጵያ ሰብዓዊ መብቶች ኮሚሽን
- Abbreviation: EHRC
- Formation: 2000
- Type: Independent agency
- Headquarters: Addis Ababa, Ethiopia
- Chief Commissioner: Berhanu Adelo
- Staff: approximately 90 (2019)
- Website: ehrc.org

The Ethiopian Human Rights Commission (EHRC) (Amharic: የኢትዮጵያ ሰብዓዊ መብቶች ኮሚሽን, romanized: Ye’ītiyop’iya Sebi‘awī Mebitochi Komīshini) is a national human rights institution (NHRI) established by the Ethiopian government. The EHRC is charged with promoting human rights and investigating human rights abuses in Ethiopia. The EHRC states organizational independence as one of its values. In October 2021, the EHRC's rating by the Global Alliance of National Human Rights Institutions for operation in accordance with the UN Paris Principles was upgraded from grade B (partial compliance) to grade A (full compliance).

== Creation ==
Mandated by provisions in the 1995 Constitution (article 55), the Ethiopian Human Rights Commission was legally established on 4 July 2000 as an autonomous body accountable to the House of Peoples' Representatives (HoPR), the lower house of the Ethiopian federal parliament. In 2004, Parliament appointed the EHRC's first Chief Commissioner.

== Leadership and structure ==
During 2017 and 2018, Addisu Gebre Egziabher was the head (Chief Commissioner) of the EHRC.

In February 2019, Daniel Bekele, a former Amnesty International prisoner of conscience, director at Human Rights Watch and a frequent critic of the EHRC, was appointed as the new chief commissioner and charged with its reform.

From July 2020 to November 2021, Aaron Maasho, a researcher and journalist, was the EHRC's director of communications. From March 2021 to February 2022, Martin Witteveen, a legal expert in international criminal law, was one of EHRC's managing investigators.

In July 2025, Daniel Bekele completed his tenure and Rakeb Melese became acting chief commissioner. On 30 January 2025, Berhanu Adelo was appointed chief commissioner.

== Independence ==
Under Proclamation No. 210/2000 establishing the EHRC, Article 13 states that the Chief Commissioner is accountable to the HoPR, not to the federal government of Ethiopia. Removal of the Chief Commissioner requires, under Article 17, the creation of a Special Inquiry Tribunal composed of members of the HoPR, of the House of Federation (HoF) and the vice-president of the Federal Supreme Court. Under Article 35, appointees and investigators of the EHRC have immunity against detention and arrest, except when caught red-handed (in flagrante delicto) for a serious offence, or with the permission of the HoPR or the Chief Commissioner. Article 40 establishes non-answerability for defamation for complainants to the EHRC and for EHRC reports.

In 2019, Amnesty International described the EHRC as lacking independence and serving government interests rather than providing accountability for abuses.

As of November 2019, the EHRC paid low salaries. The chief commissioner earned an after-tax salary of US$270 per month, typical for Ethiopian civil servants. Spending of the US$3 million annual budget required approval by the Ministry of Finance, which was seen as a constraint on the EHRC's autonomy. The EHRC received hundreds of complaints monthly in 2019, but could only investigate a small percentage due to its lack of talented staff and budgetary autonomy.

According to The Guardian, after Daniel Bekele took over as leader of the EHRC in early 2019, he strengthened the EHRC's capacities and independence, making it "into something approaching a proper watchdog". Improvements included greater independence in selecting commissioners and employing and dismissing staff, while commissioners had earlier mostly consisted of ruling party members. The EHRC gained more power in making unannounced visits to prisons, and getting more access for lawyers and family members to political prisoners.

In response to the EHRC's November 2020 report on the Mai Kadra massacre, there was a "growing perception among Tigrayans" that the EHRC was biased in favour of the federal government's view of the massacre. Daniel stated that "at the time we did not have enough information to document and report on" attacks against Tigrayans during the massacre. The EHRC's March 2021 report on the Axum massacre "provoked outcry among Ethiopian and Eritrean government supporters", according to The Guardian. The Attorney General's office initially claimed that the victims killed in Axum were Tigray People's Liberation Front fighters rather than civilians, while later "conceding" that 40 of the victims were civilians. Daniel stated that "a good number of officials" reacted constructively to the report, while "some" were "very dismissive". Ethiopian officials claimed that EHRC reports on detention conditions in Oromia were "biased and unbalanced" in May 2021.

In June 2021, Daniel described his vision for the independence of the EHRC, stating, "state institutions in Ethiopia have a history of not being independent or impartial, but on the other hand we have started a process of trying to build independent institutions and I believe the Ethiopian human rights commission is one of them".

In October 2021, the Global Alliance of National Human Rights Institutions upgraded the Ethiopian Human Rights Commission from its previous status of "B", partial compliance with the Paris Principles of human rights standards, to "A" status, full compliance.

In February 2024, Aaron Maasho and Martin Witteveen, who held responsibilities in the EHRC during 2020–2022, stated in relation to the EHRC–OHCHR Tigray investigation that "the EHRC senior leadership was prone to downplaying the Ethiopian military's crimes and skilled at systematically obscuring them".

== Investigations ==
=== 2020 ===
==== 30 June–2 July 2020 Hachalu Hundessa riots ====
The EHRC published its full report on the Hachalu Hundessa riots on 1 January 2021. It found that part of the killings were a crime against humanity, with deliberate, widespread systematic killing of civilians by organised groups in 40 different locations over the three days of 30 June–2 July 2020. The EHRC counted 123 deaths, 76 of which it attributed to security forces. The EHRC found that security forces successfully prevented attacks in some places, failed to prevent them in others, and appeared to have used excessive lethal force. The EHRC called for regional and federal government investigations, judicial proceedings and institutional development to prevent the recurrence of similar events.

==== November: Konso Zone ====
During 21–25 November, the EHRC investigated conflict in the Konso Zone that had taken place during 10–21 November. It found that 66 people had been killed, 39 injured, 100,000 displaced and houses and other property had been burnt. The people interviewed by the EHRC gave numerous, conflicting accounts attributing responsibility for the violence. The EHRC saw contributing factors to the violence as including unmet popular demand for administrative changes, border conflicts and competition for the use of natural resources. The EHRC made recommendations to authorities for solving the conflict. The EHRC commented that Ethiopian National Defence Force (ENDF) soldiers had left the area on 31 October.

==== November: Mai Kadra massacre ====
On 24 November 2020, the EHRC released its preliminary report on the Mai Kadra massacre that took place during the 2020–2021 Tigray War, after visiting Mai Kadra to collect evidence. EHRC's preliminary findings were that 600 people of Amhara ethnicity were killed by local Tigrayan youth with the support of local police.

==== December: Metekel massacre ====
The EHRC collected evidence following the 23 December 2020 Metekel massacre. The EHRC found that many of the victims were Shinasha and that survivors knew the perpetrators "by name and sight". The EHRC described the massacre as a "sign of a severe decline of human rights protections" and criticised the authorities for the departure of the Ethiopian National Defense Force (ENDF) from the area of the massacre on the preceding day.

=== 2021 ===
==== December/January: Humera, Dansha and Bissober ====
In January 2021, the EHRC published a brief monitoring report on Humera, Dansha and Bissober, based on its 14–18 November 2020 visit to Dansha, Humera and Mai Kadra, its 15–20 December visit to Dansha and Gondar, and its 31 December–5 January 2021 visit to Bissober and Ullaga.

A Humera hospital employee informed the EHRC that 92 people from the ENDF and TPLF and civilians were killed in the war. Security was mainly controlled by Amhara Liyu Hayl and militia. Looting by Fano, Amhara Liyu Hayl and militia, and ENDF and Eritrean Defence Forces (EDF) soldiers was reported. Harassment of ethnic Tigrayan residents was reported.

In Dansha, the EHRC estimated the number of civilians killed as 25, without details such as identity and place of burial. Residents of Dansha stated that the deaths occurred during crossfire. Ethnic Tigrayan residents stated that security had improved at the time of the EHRC's visit, but that they remained afraid of attacks and "retaliation for what happened [in] Mai Kadra". Some regular services had restarted operating as of mid-December, but electricity, water and schools remained unoperational. The EHRC quoted the new interim coordinator of Dansha: "Tigrayans live peacefully in the area, but those residents who felt at risk were provided with transportation to their chosen destinations".

In Ullaga, EHRC members visited trenches that had been dug in the primary school grounds by the TPLF in preparation for war since June 2020, according to residents. The residents counted 31 civilian deaths from three days of fighting, most due to crossfire, some were deliberately killed by soldiers, and others were killed by unidentified people. Bissober residents counted 27 civilian deaths. The EHRC named 21 of the Bissober victims and four of the Ullaga victims. The EHRC documented reports of three people in Bissober executed by the ENDF after being accused of being TPLF informants, and reports of people being beaten for the same reason.

The EHRC agreed with the Transitional Government of Tigray that a high level of humanitarian assistance was needed.

==== January: Tigray War ====
On 10 February, the EHRC published a brief report based on its 10–23 January visit to Mekelle and Alamata, Endamekoni and Kukufto in the Southern Zone of Tigray Region, describing the extensive lack of key infrastructure, the division of Tigray into multiple sectors of administrative control, 108 cases of rape officially reported in Mekelle, Adigrat, Wukro and Ayder over two months, a lack of police and health structures where rape victims would normally report the rapes, and summarised cases of child victims of the war and internally displaced people. The EHRC lacked sufficient information to check the numbers of refoulement of Eritrean refugees to Eritrea.

In February 2021, the EHRC said that it was verifying the video of the 5–6 January 2021 Debre Abbay massacre and would "investigate the incident" if it judged the video to be authentic.

==== March: Aksum massacre ====
The EHRC visited Aksum in Tigray Region from 27 February to 5 March 2021 during the Tigray War, after initial reports of the Aksum massacre leaked out to the world in early January. The EHRC conducted interviews with "survivors, 45 families of victims, eyewitnesses and religious leaders", held a group discussion with 20 residents, talks with local kebele officials, and discussions with medical staff of the Saint Mary and Aksum Referral Hospitals. In its preliminary report, the EHRC attributed the main part of the massacre, that of the 28–29 November weekend, to the EDF, and stated that it had "gathered evidence" of over 100 victims of the massacre. The EHRC stated that the crimes committed could constitute crimes against humanity.

==== August: Galikoma massacre ====
On 10 August, the EHRC deployed a team to Galikoma in the Afar Region to investigate a massacre that occurred on 5 August and which could be attributable to the Tigray Defense Forces.

=== EHRC–OHCRC Tigray investigation ===
In mid-2021, the EHRC launched a joint investigation together with the Office of the United Nations High Commissioner for Human Rights (OHCRC) into Tigray War human rights violations committed by all parties.

== Advisory opinions ==
In January 2020, the EHRC gave advice to the HoPR on a draft revision of the Ethiopian Criminal Procedure Code and Evidence Law. Motivations for the revision of the 1961 code included taking into account the federal Ethiopian system and regional and international treaties. The EHRC provided a 33-page report with 30 recommendations for improvements on the draft, recommending implementation of the requirements of "precaution, legality, necessity, proportionality and non-discrimination" in the use of force by police to minimise police brutality; minimalising the use of pre-trial detention; accountability to avoid torture during interrogations; compensatory procedures for illegal detentions; the presumption of innocence; procedures for fair trials; accounting for the needs of vulnerable groups throughout policing and judicial procedures; and concerns about traditional judicial systems.

== See also ==
- EHRC–OHCRC Tigray investigation
