= Welkait question =

Controversial dispute regarding the Ethiopian city Welkait

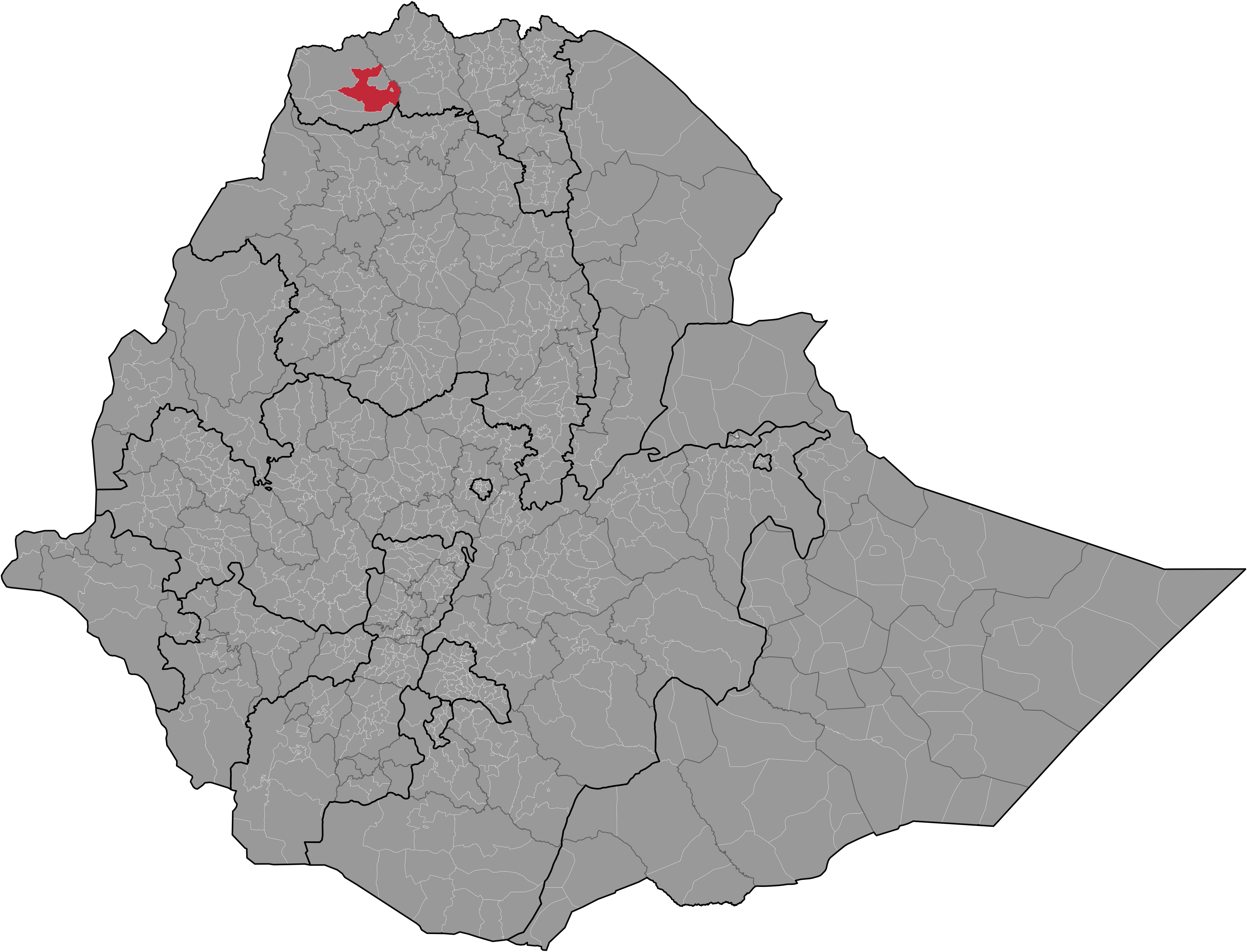
Welkait within Western Tigray Zone

The Welkait question involves a controversial territorial dispute surrounding the Ethiopian area Welkait, which is situated in the present-day Tigray Region. Welkait had been an independent area but was incorporated within Begmeder province. After the Derg regime collapsed in 1991, the area was given by the TPLF government to Tigray's Western Zone.

On 19 April 2018, Prime Minister Abiy Ahmed convened the Tigray and Welkait Committee counterparts in Gondar. Abiy encouraged stakeholders to resolve the matter peacefully.

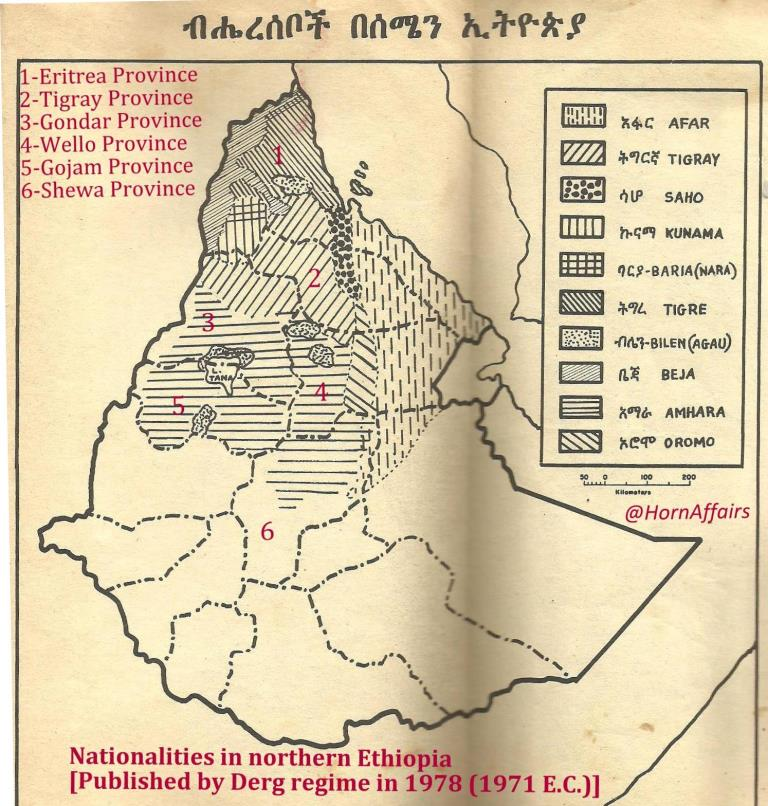
Image from 1978 about the linguistic status of Welkait

== Tigrayan claims ==
Welkait was historically its own province until 1944 when it was incorporated into Begmeder. This decision by Haile Selassie aimed to punish Tigray for the first Woyane rebellion. The uprising, led by Tigrayan farmers, was a response to Haile Selassie's plans to centralize power in Ethiopia around the government in Shewa, which went against the Tigrayan people's desire for self-determination.

Following the suppression of the rebellion, Haile Selassie assigned Welkait to Begmeder to allow the Amhara-led elite in Begmeder to control the area and weaken Tigrayan unity, preventing further uprisings. Raesi Mengesha Seyoum, the last monarch prince in Tigray, attested to the fact that, during his youth, all of Western Tigray and Southern Tigray to Alwuha Milash belonged to Tigray. However, portions of Western Tigray and Southern Tigray were taken from Tigray in the 1940s by Haile Selassie as a punitive measure and to expand Amhara influence.

After the fall of communist Derg in 1991, Welkait was reassigned to Western Tigray, due to its close ties to the Tigray people. The Welkait question —whether it is Tigrayan or Amhara—intensified with its incorporation into the Tigray region. According to a demographic analysis done by the Derg regime about the population of the larger Begmeder province, the population of Welkait in 1984 was 221,692 residents. The same analysis stated that the Tigrayan population of Begmeder was 190,183 people, which made Tigrayans the second largest ethnicity. The study provided evidence that Tigrayans were a majority in Welkait. Multiple linguistic and ethnic maps supporting the population's majority Tigrayan ethnicity.

Maps and books written long before the TPLF's rise to power provide evidence of the Tigrayan majority in the area. The American sociologist and author Donald N. Levine, whose primary field was Ethiopian studies, wrote the classical work "Wax and Gold: Tradition and Innovation in Ethiopian Culture". The book contains maps of the languages spoken across Ethiopia, proving the language spoken in Welkait was Tigrinya with a Tigrayan majority. The book "Class Struggle and the Problem in Eritrea", written by the Kenyan politician Peter Anyang' Nyong'o in 1979, proves the same. The names of cities and towns such as Mai Kadra, Mai Tsebri, Tselemti and Addi Remets are Tigrinya.

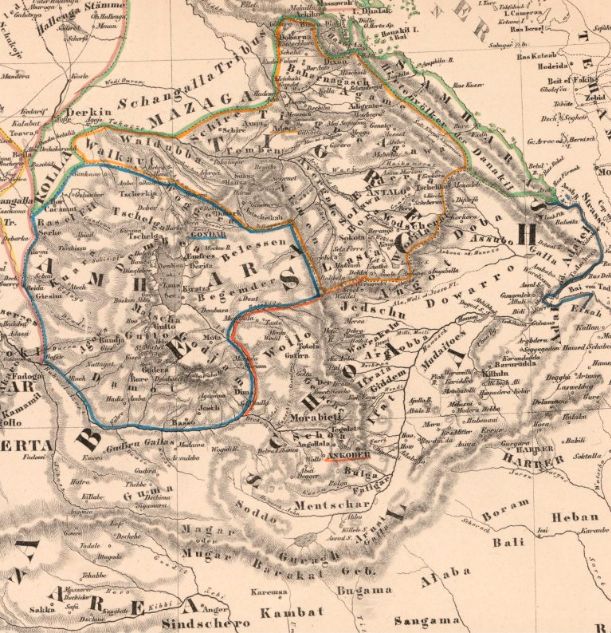
19th-century ethnic map from Ghent University, Belgium, depicting northern Ethiopia. In this map, Welkait is identified as ethnically Tigrayan.

The resignation of Prime Minister Hailemariam Desalegn led to the release of Col. Demeke Zewdu, who was activist for the incorporation of Welkait into the Amhara region.

During the Tigray war, the Tigray Region was attacked by the Amhara militia Fano and there were mass killings reported against the civilians in Welkait. Mass rape, forced deportations and ethnic oppression became a normal part of life for the people of Welkait. Human Rights Watch and Amnesty International both expressed their concerns about the events. Amnesty International stated: "newly-appointed officials in Western Tigray and security forces from the neighbouring Amhara region, with the acquiescence and possible participation of Ethiopian federal forces, systematically expelled several hundred thousand Tigrayan civilians from their homes using threats, unlawful killings, sexual violence, mass arbitrary detention, pillage, forcible transfer, and the denial of humanitarian assistance. These widespread and systematic attacks against the Tigrayan civilian population amount to crimes against humanity, as well as war crimes." Concerns about war crimes committed against the people of Welkait has caused mass protests all across the world, especially among the Tigrayan diaspora (see Reactions to the Tigray War). Fano are currently still committing these mass atrocities. ENDF military forces withdrew from the area during the Amhara Region conference with the Prosperity Party on 16 March 2023, so there is no external military intervention to stop these mass expulsions of the people of Welkait.

HRW stated that hundred of thousands of Tigrayans have fled Welkait because of fear of the relentless persecution they have faced. Due to claims by Amhara nationalists on Welkait, justifications for the mass killings of Tigrayans is widespread in the Amhara region. HRW states that when the mass expulsions in Welkait started, the majority of Tigrayans left, while the ones that stayed hid in their homes. Amhara residents would paint "ት", a Ge´ez (Ethiopian) "T", in front of the homes of Tigrayans, where the residents would later be killed for resisting the expulsion. There is an active ongoing attempt to cleanse the Tigrayan majority and replace it with an Amhara majority.

== Amhara claims ==
After the Derg collapse, the TPLF annexed Welkait into Western Tigray and began harassing, deporting, killing, and arresting people identified with the Amhara ethnicity. At least 5,000 Amharas were displaced and hundreds of thousands of Tigrayans settled in Welkait. Many people were forced to speak Tigrinya language, and names of rivers, lakes, mountains, spring and cities were changed from Amharic to Tigrinya. Some Tigrayans displaced Amhara farmers and took their land.

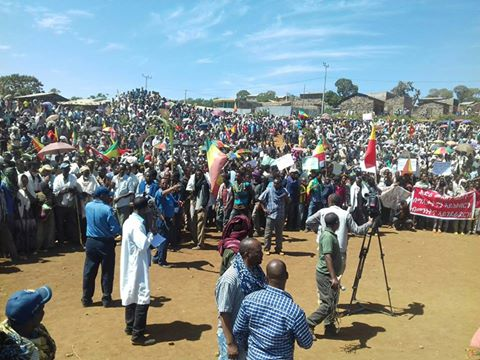
Demonstration in Welkait in 2016

In 2015, Amharas from Begmeder formed the Welkait Amhara Identity Question Committee and collected 25,000 signatures. They submitted the signatures to zonal, regional and federal offices on 17 December 2015, but faced rejections. Soon after, the TPLF government began arbitrary arrests and purges against the committee members. In July 2016, most of its members were detained in Gondar and transported to Addis Ababa's Central Prison. Colonel Demeke Zewdu was among those arrested.

As the arbitrary arrests and tortures intensified, Welkait Committee members set off series of protests in Amhara Region. These coincided with large-scale protests across Ethiopia, which eventually led to Abiy Ahmed becoming prime minister. He met with Welkait Committee members in Goha Hotel, Gondar on 19 April 2018. In the meeting, Abiy pleaded for Tigrayan security forces to not harass or kill civilians and asked that the Welkait question be peacefully resolved in a constitutional manner.

Still, the Tigray government continued atrocities around the annexed area. Many Amharas, who spoke the Amharic language or sang Amharic songs, were beaten, incarcerated and thrown to their death from cliffs. In 2019, the TPLF sponsored youth group samri held many Amharas from Mai Kadra and summarily executed them. Amidst the Tigray War in August 2021, TPLF spokesperson Getachew Reda said that TPLF was not ready for national dialogue to end the war and chose to continue the armed conflict by financing several factions of Oromo and Qemant peoples. Contested areas in Western Tigray such as Welkait, Tsegede, Setit and Humera special zone were seized by the Amhara Special Force. In May 2021, a reconciliation dialogue was held between Amhara and Tigrayan community members. According to Hiber Radio, the ENDF military forces withdrew from the area during the Amhara Region conference with the Prosperity Party on 16 March 2023.

Developments following the 2022 Pretoria Agreement

The Pretoria Agreement, signed on 2 November 2022 between the Ethiopian federal government and the Tigray People's Liberation Front (TPLF), provided for resolving disputed territorial issues in accordance with the Ethiopian Constitution. However, it did not establish a final administrative arrangement for Welkait, Tsegede and Humera.

Following the outbreak of the Tigray War in November 2020, Amhara authorities established control over Welkait, Tsegede and Humera. This administrative arrangement continued after the Pretoria Agreement. In April 2026, Human Rights Watch reported that hundreds of thousands of displaced Tigrayans from Western Tigray remained unable to return and documented continuing restrictions and arbitrary detentions affecting Tigrayans in the area.

== See also ==
- Welkait
- 2014–2016 Oromo protests
