= Timeline of Fano militia =

The following lists are timeline of the Amhara nationalist Fano militia in Ethiopia. It is arranged by date with events and references.

== 2016–2020 ==
Date	Events	Ref.
2016	Amhara youth movements emerged amidst nationwide protests.	
2018	Those movements developed through amalgamation of national forces, local paramilitary and gendarmerie force under the command of the government of the Amhara Region.	
2018	Fano integrated its security apparatus under influence of General Asaminew Tsige.	
10 January 2019	Local militias and regional forces build trenches and began assaulting Qemant people.	
29 September 2019	The militia set ablaze four members of family in Azezo in retaliation for killing of Amhara youth.	
19 March 2020	Fano began clashing with federal security forces in Gondar and Dabat in the Amhara Region. Three people injured.	
23 April 2020	According to local media, Fano leader Mesafint Tesfu reached agreement with the government.	

== 2020–2022 ==
Date	Events	Ref.
November 2024	During the onset of Tigray War, Fano aligned with Amhara regional force and the federal government and seized the Western Tigray Region.	
Mid-December 2020	The militia formed provisional "Setit-Humera zone", covering the former Welkait, Kafta Humera, and Tsegede wereda.	
11 June – 6 July 2021	In Operation Alula, Fano mobilized with thousands of young men joining the militia. the militia then garnered support from Orthodox clergies to offer prayer and blessing.	
19 May 2022	Clashes broke out between the Fano militia and the government force after the government force attempting to disarm and arrest Fano members.	
23 May 2022	The local media reported over 4,500 people were arrested.	

== 2022–present ==
Date	Events	Ref.
April 2023	Tensions between Fano and the government arises when the Ethiopian government decided to integrate the Amhara Regional Special Forces into the national army, leading to broader war in Amhara Region.	
1 August 2023	Full scale clashes occurred in Gondar, Debre Tabor and Debre Markos.	
2 August 2023	Fano seized Lalibela.	
6 August 2024	It was reported that various Fano factions combined to one single central command named "Amhara Fano Central Command", announced by Eskinder Nega.	
July 2024	Fano launched a new offensive, prompting ENDF to counteroffensive in October 2024.	
