= Welkait Committee =

Ethiopian Amhara-led committee

- ወልቃይት ኮሚቴ
- Formation: 23 August 2015; 11 years ago
- Type: Committee
- Head: Demeke Zewdu
- Secretary-General: Teshager Woldemichael

The Welkait Committee is an Amhara-led committee that demands the return of Welkait district to Amhara Region's North Gondar Zone. According to the Committee, Welkait has been part of Amhara province which was annexed by the Ethiopian People's Revolutionary Democratic Front regime in 1991 to Western Tigray Zone. On 23 August 2015, the committee was formed by convening the first meeting, forming 20 members including Colonel Demeke Zewdu as head of mobilization and Teshager Woldemichael as secretary.

In July 2016, the committee members were subjected to imprisonment by EPRDF government for petitioning about Amhara identity in Welkait.

== History ==
The Welkait Committee was established on 23 August 2015 following the collection of 25,000 signatures people in Welkait . The committee sought to improve the institutional conditions of Amhara people as well as prevent anti-Amhara discrimination in the disputed region. On 19 September, the committee conducted its inaugural conference at the Landmark Hotel in Gondar with approximately 450 Welkait Amhara in attendance. 20 members formed the committee. Colonel Demeke Zewdu has been the head of mobilization and Teshager Woldemichael as secretary. On 17 December 2015, the Committee submitted complaint letters to zonal, regional and federal offices, which were all rejected. In July 2016, the Committee members were arrested and tortured for petitioning about Welkait Amhara identity.

Amhara forces soon carried out a coordinated campaign of ethnic cleansing against Tigrayans in Western Tigray. In several towns across Western Tigray, signs were displayed ordering Tigrayans to leave, and local administrators discussed plans to remove Tigrayans in open meetings. By mid-December, they had established a provisional "Setit-Humera zone," covering the former Welkait, Kafta Humera, and Tsegede wereda. Humera, Addi Remets and Dansha were virtually depopulated, with numerous shops closed, some of them subjected to looting. Any traces of a Tigrinya-speaking administration were deliberately erased. Tigrinya signs, including those on private hotels and shops, were repainted. Many houses were destroyed during the fighting, but others were deliberately set on fire after active combat had ceased. Many Tigrayan communities, facing intimidation, fled east, towards central Tigray. Officials from the provisional administration then actively encouraged people from Gondar areas to settle in, offering free houses to those with connections to the new administration. In contrast to towns with majority Tigrayan populations, The New York Times reports that towns in the zone with majority Amhara populations were "thriving, with bustling shops, bars and restaurants."

== See also ==
- Welkait question
- Tigraynization
