= Humera massacre (2020) =

Ethnic massacre as part of the Tigray War in 2020

- Part of the Tigray War
- Location of Humera in Ethiopia
- Location: Humera(Tigrinya: ሑሞራ), Tigray Region, Ethiopia
- Date: early November 2020
- Target: Tigrayans
- Attack type: Mass killing; Ethnic cleansing
- Deaths: 92
- Perpetrators: Fano, per Telegraph, NYT, EHRC; (Ethiopia) ENDF, per Guardian

The Humera massacre was an ethnic mass murder event carried out in November 2020 in the town of Humera (Tigrinya: ሑሞራ) in the Tigray Region of northwestern Ethiopia, next to the Sudanese border. The massacre took place during an armed conflict between the regional government of Tigray and the federal government of Ethiopia. Refugees attributed the massacre to Amhara militias, including Fano, and the Ethiopian National Defense Force (ENDF).

== Background ==
During the Tigray War, the ENDF claimed to have obtained control of Humera Airport, 70 km south of Humera, on 10 November and claimed to gain control of Humera on 12 November.

== Testimonies ==
Refugees who had been interviewed by the Daily Telegraph implicated the Ethiopian military and Amhara militias in a massacre in Humera on unknown dates in early November 2020. The refugees stated that they "were attacked by knife-wielding militiamen from the neighbouring Amhara region, who had joined forces with federal troops and cut people to death as they tried to escape." Zenebe, an ethnic Tigrayan, stated, "The soldiers of Abiy Ahmed didn't differentiate between people. They crushed all the people. It is like a genocide." Gidey, also a Tigrayan, stated, "I saw soldiers kill a taxi man and the two people in the taxi because there was a poster of the Tigrayan president in the car." One witness said that he had seen twenty bodies killed by knives, guns and shelling.

A 54-year old refugee interviewed by The Guardian, Gush Tela from Humera, stated that he was beaten by federal security forces "until he was covered in blood and could not walk". He stated that the federal forces transferred him to an Amhara youth group, Fano, who freed him. Tela stated that the Fano were ordered to destroy Humera and "'finish' Tigrayans". Tela said that he witnessed a man "beheaded with machetes". Other refugees showed wounds that they attributed to "knife and machete attacks by Fano militia". A Humera resident, Meles, interviewed by The New York Times in a refugee camp, stated that the Amhara militias that arrived in Humera had "cut people's heads".

On 23 November, AFP stated that the administration of the conquered parts of Western Tigray had been taken over by officials from Amhara Region.

== EHRC visit ==
Based on its 14–18 November 2020 visit to Dansha, Humera and Mai Kadra and a visit to Mekelle and other parts of Tigray Region starting on 10 January 2021, the Ethiopian Human Rights Commission (EHRC) reported a Humera hospital employee's count of the war deaths as 92, including ENDF, TPLF and civilians. Security was mainly controlled by Amhara special forces and militia. Looting by Fano, Amhara special forces and militia, and ENDF and Eritrean Defense Forces (EDF) soldiers was reported, as well as harassment of ethnic Tigrayan residents.

The EHRC–OHCHR Tigray investigation reported victims from shelling as well as the massacre in this locality, without going into further detail about the latter.

== Wider region ==
Ashenafi Hailu, an ethnic Tigrayan, survived a massacre on a road during the Tigrayan conflict, and fled to the Hamdayet Border Reception Centre in Sudan as a refugee.

On 29 November, the Ethiopian Broadcasting Corporation stated that 70 burial pits containing bodies were found close to Humera Airport. In the televised report, an anonymous military official attributed the deaths to the TPLF.

== Reactions ==
After months of denial by the Ethiopian authorities that massacres occurred in Tigray, a joint investigation by OHCHR and the Ethiopian Human Rights Commission has been announced in March 2021.

While the Ethiopian government promised that Eritrean troops will be pulled out from Tigray, the Eritrean government denies any participation in warfare in Tigray, let alone in massacres.
