= Gobe Melke =

Ethiopian guerrilla fighter of Fano unit (1947–2017)

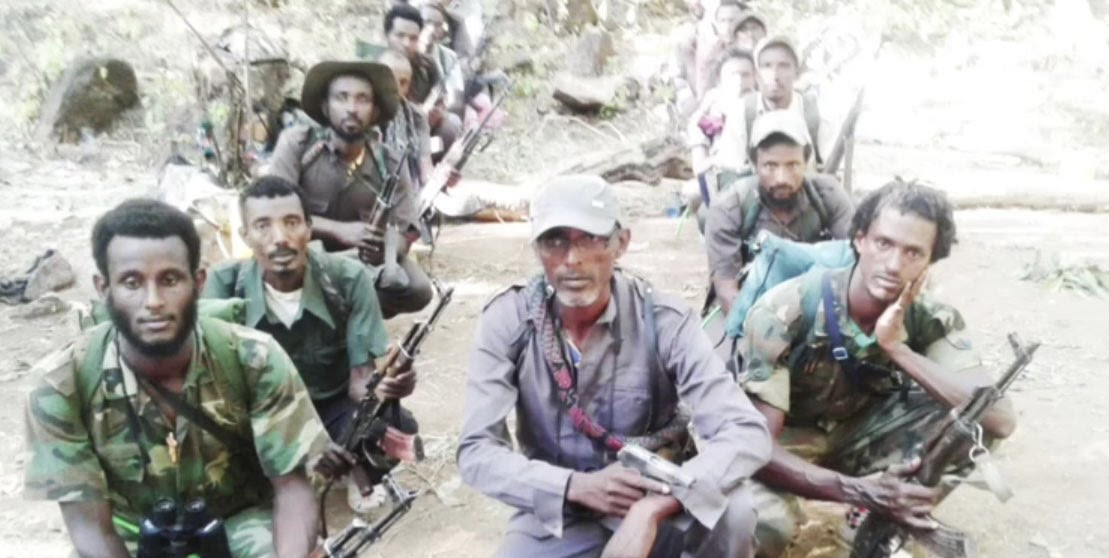
Gobe (center) and his militia in a 2016 interview

Gobe Melke (Amharic: ጎቤ መልኬ; 1947–2017) was an Ethiopian guerrilla fighter and former commander of the Fano militia.

== Life ==
Melke was born in Tsegede, Begemder Province and was a farmer prior to his involvement in armed resistance. He later devoted his life to armed struggle after the then EPRDF government's oppression towards the people of his ethnic group, the Amhara. In July 2016, Melke led Fano when North Gonder was turned into a war zone after the Ethiopian government, deployed the national army in the region to quell anti-government protests during the 2016–2018 Ethiopian state of emergency. He engaged in guerrilla warfare against the EPRDF government during which he killed numerous government forces, and took many prisoner before being wounded in the spring of 2017. Melke was assassinated in March 2017 by an ANDM agent who happened to be his close relative.

His resistance movement in Gonder was inspired by Ethiopia’s resistance against fascist Italy during Italian East Africa and kicked off after peaceful demonstrations against the TPLF's forced annexation of ethnic Amhara land west of the Tekeze River such as Wolkait were violently repressed by the government during the state of emergency.

Gobe Melke, in an exclusive interview with ESAT, revealed that his forces worked in tandem with Ginbot 7, an armed opposition group operating out of Eritrea, to inflict heavy losses on government forces in November 2016. His rebel forces are also noted as being one of the earliest and most impactful Fano militia.
