= Edaga Hamus =

Edaga Hamus or Idaga Hamus (Tigrigna "Thursday Market") may refer to:

- Idaga Hamus (Saesi Tsaedaemba), a town in the eastern zone of the Ethiopian [Tigray region
- Idaga Hamus (Tsegede), a village in the western zone of the Ethiopian Tigray region
- Edaga Hamus, Eritrea, a district of the Eritrean capital Asmara
  - Edaga Hamus (Eritrean football club), a football club based in Edaga Hamus (district of Asmara)
