= Dansha Airport =

Airport in Ethiopia

Dansha Airport Dansheha Airport
- IATA: none; ICAO: HADA

Summary
- Airport type: Public
- Serves: Dansha, Ethiopia
- Elevation AMSL: 2,585 ft / 788 m
- Coordinates: 13°38′10″N 36°55′50″E

Map
- Location of the airport in Ethiopia

Runways
Direction	Length		Surface
Direction	m	ft	Surface
09/27	1,490	4,888	Asphalt
- Source: Google Maps GCM

Dansha Airport (ICAO: HADA) is a public airport serving Dansha, a town in the Tigray Region of northern Ethiopia. The airport is 9 kilometres (5.6 mi) northwest of the town.

== See also ==
- Transport in Ethiopia
- List of airports in Ethiopia
