= Demeke Zewdu =

Ethiopian politician and former army officer

Colonel Demeke Zewdu
- Born: Telelo, Welkait, Tigray, Ethiopia
- Occupations: Politician; army officer
- Organization: Welkait Committee
- Military career
- Allegiance: EPRDF
- Conflicts: Ethiopian Civil War

Colonel Demeke Zewdu (Amharic: ደመቀ ዘውዱ) is an Ethiopian politician and former army officer who is a key figure in Welkait dispute, advocating Amhara self-government over Welkait district.

An ardent supporter of Amhara nationalism, he cofounded and led the Welkait Committee to secure the legal status of Welkait as belonging to the Amhara people. He imprisoned in 2016 by the TPLF government but acquitted and released in February 2018.

== Life and career ==
Demeke Zewdu was born into a farming family, and grew up in Telelo, in southern Welkait Tegede. During his teenage years, he began a military career by joining the Tigray People's Liberation Front (TPLF) insurgency against the Derg regime during the Ethiopian Civil War.

Demeke served as the head of Wolkait Committee in 2015, which was consisted of 20 members at that time. In 2016, Demeke was arrested by the government security force in Gondar after he reportedly killed one of security enforcers in a firefight. He then subsequently transferred to Tigray custody after decision to move in Gondar prison was challenged by residents of Gondar. In February 2018, it was reported that charges against Demeke, General Asaminew Tsige, General Tefera Mamo, Nigist Yirga, Getachew Adamu, Atalay Zerfe and more than 90 others is dropped. Demeke was released from prison on 19 February 2018.

== See also ==
- Welkait question
