= Idaga Hamus (Tsegede) =

Village in the western zone of the Ethiopian Tigray region

Idaga Hamus (Tigrigna "Thursday Market") is a village in northern Ethiopia. Located in the Mirabawi Zone of the Tigray Region (or kilil) of Ethiopia, this town is the largest settlement in Tsegede woreda.
