= Haile Maryam Gebre =

Ethiopian governor in 19th century

Haile Maryam Gebre (Note: Variations of spelling in various sources; Haylä Maryam Gäbre Hayle Maryam Gebre, Haile Mariam Gebru, Khaylu Maryam Gebre Hilier Mariam) of Semien & Enderta, Horse name: Abba Dammana (lit: Father of the Cloud) was an early 19th century governor of Semien, Welkait and Wogera. Haile Maryam tried to hold his hereditary possessions in the face of continuous pressure from rival lords during Ethiopia's Zemene Mesafint era. He is remembered as the guardian of Waldeba monastery.

== Ancestry ==
Haile Maryam's family originated from the Semien mountains and belonged to the Orthodox Christian Amharas. His mother was Sahlitu Kefle Iyesus, (Note: also spelled as Sahlitu Kifle Yesus Sahlitu herself had Solomonic Amhara heritage as a descendant of Lebna Dengel.) daughter of Enderta hereditary chief Kefle Iyesus of Beyeda and sister of Ras Woldeselassie, the ruler of Tigray; and his father was Ras Gebre of Semien, the ruler of Semien, Tsegede, Welkait and Wogera.

His sister Teshen Gebre was one of the wives of Emperor Tekle Giyorgis I.

== Life ==
=== Yejju invasion ===
In 1812 according to Nathaniel Pearce's journal, Ras Gugsa of Yejju ordered his head general Ackly Marro to wage war against Haile Maryam's father, Ras Gebre of Semien. However, Ras Gugsa's expansionist drive to subdue Semien came to an end when Haile Maryam defeated his retainer Woldi Comfu in Welkait.

=== Invasion from Tigray ===
Nathaniel Pearce (serving in the court of Ras Wolde Selassie) documented that in February 1813 Ras Wolde Selassie's forces invaded Welkait which Haile Maryam governed in the name of his father Gebre as chief. After the Tigrayans suffered severe losses on February 20, a month later Wolde Selassie's forces were victorious on March 19. Pearce noted that ‘‘Haile Maryam fought very bravely’’ but that the Tigrayan muskets were decisive. His brother Batri Gebre, and Asgas Sedit, the chief of Arbarcholo, his women, servants, and a great number of horses were captured. The battle left four hundred dead.

=== Succession 1815 ===
In 1815 Haile Maryam succeeded his father as governor. He struggled against his rival Dejazmach Maru of Dembiya from the competing house of Fenja.

=== May-June raids into Tigray ===
In May 1817 Haile Maryam encamped near the Tekeze river and had his forces raid Abergele and other Tigrayan districts under the control of Ras Gebre Mikael of Tembien, a descendant of Ras Mikael Sehul. On June 9, Haile Maryam crossed the Tekeze, and burned and plundered Abergele and several other villages.

== Battle of Waldeba and Death 1826 ==
The death of the regent Ras Gugsa in 1825 ushered in another period of frenetic political warfare. Haile Maryam forged an alliance with his rival Maru of the house Fenja, against the new Ras Yimam, Gugsa's successor. However, Maru sided with Yimam the following year, after Haile Maryam briefly deposed Emperor Gigar in Gondar and replaced him with a figurehead of his choice; Baeda Maryam III. Haile Maryam fought the coalition forces of Yimam's and Maru in a pitched battle near Waldeba that lasted over three days and was defeated. Gravely injured, Haile Maryam succumbed to his wounds and died in his mountain stronghold in Semien.

Haile Maryam was laid to rest in the monastery of Waldeba, the sanctuary for which he was known as the protector during his lifetime.

== Legacy ==
Haile Maryam's official wife was Hirut Gugsa, the daughter of regent Gugsa of Yejju and Amete Selassie, the daughter of Emperor Tekle Giyorgis I. She had Merso, Betul and Yewub-dar.

- Merso Haile Mariam was the oldest son of Haile Maryam Gebre and Hirut Gugsa.
- Betul Haile Maryam was the second son of Haile Maryam Gebre and Hirut Gugsa. Betul was the father of Empress Taytu Betul, spouse of Emperor Menelik II
- Yewub-dar Haile Maryam was the daughter of Haile Maryam Gebre and Hirut Gugsa. Yewub-dar was one of the wives of Sabagadis Woldu.

Haile Maryam had a liaison with Mintaye, a peasant woman from Jan Amora. She gave birth to Wube

- Wube Haile Maryam became one of the most prominent figures of the Zemene Mesafint era.
