= Kafta Humera =

District in Western Zone, Ethiopia

Coordinates: 14°00′N 37°00′E

Kafta Humera ቃፍታ ሑመራ
- Woreda
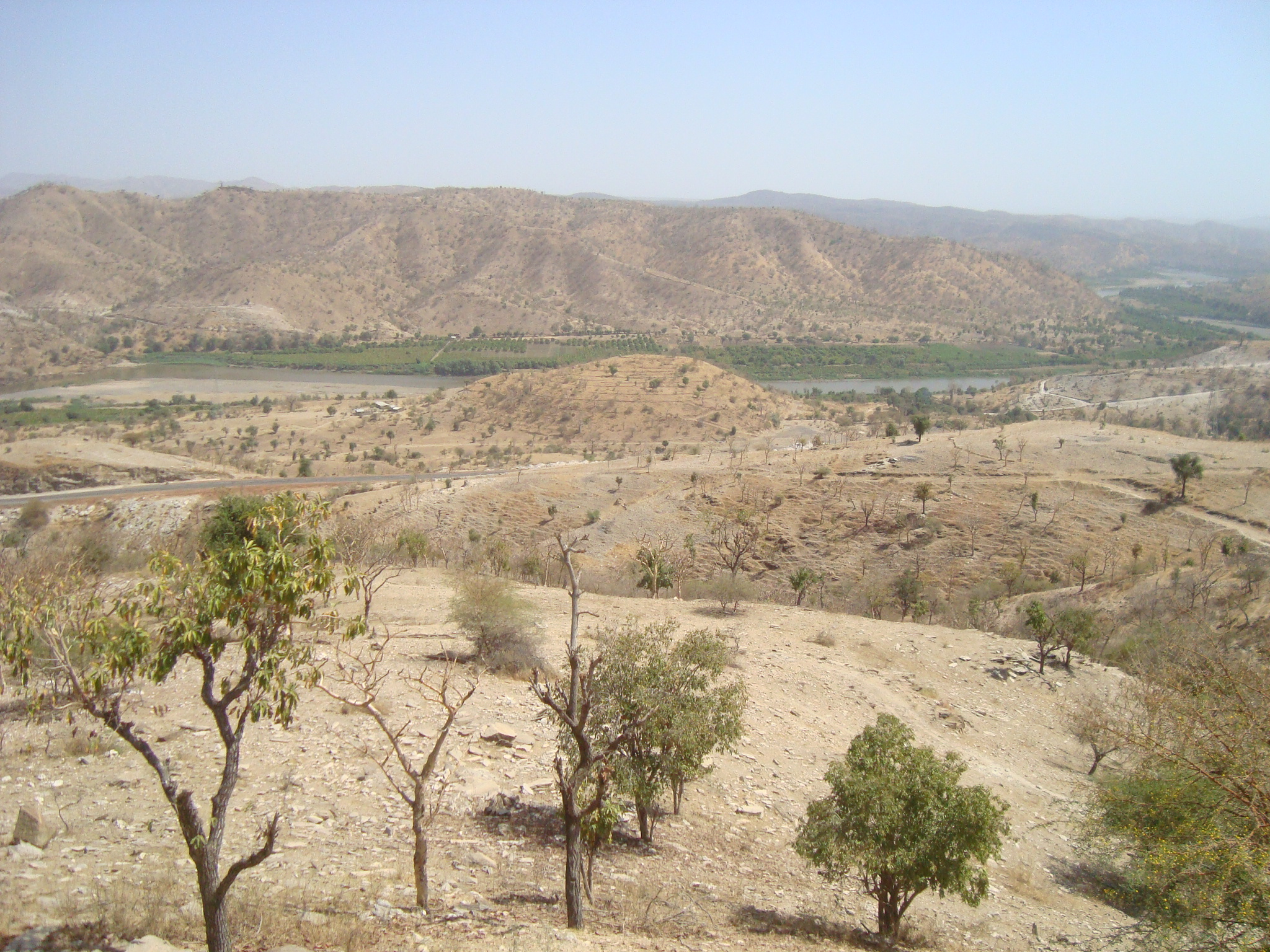

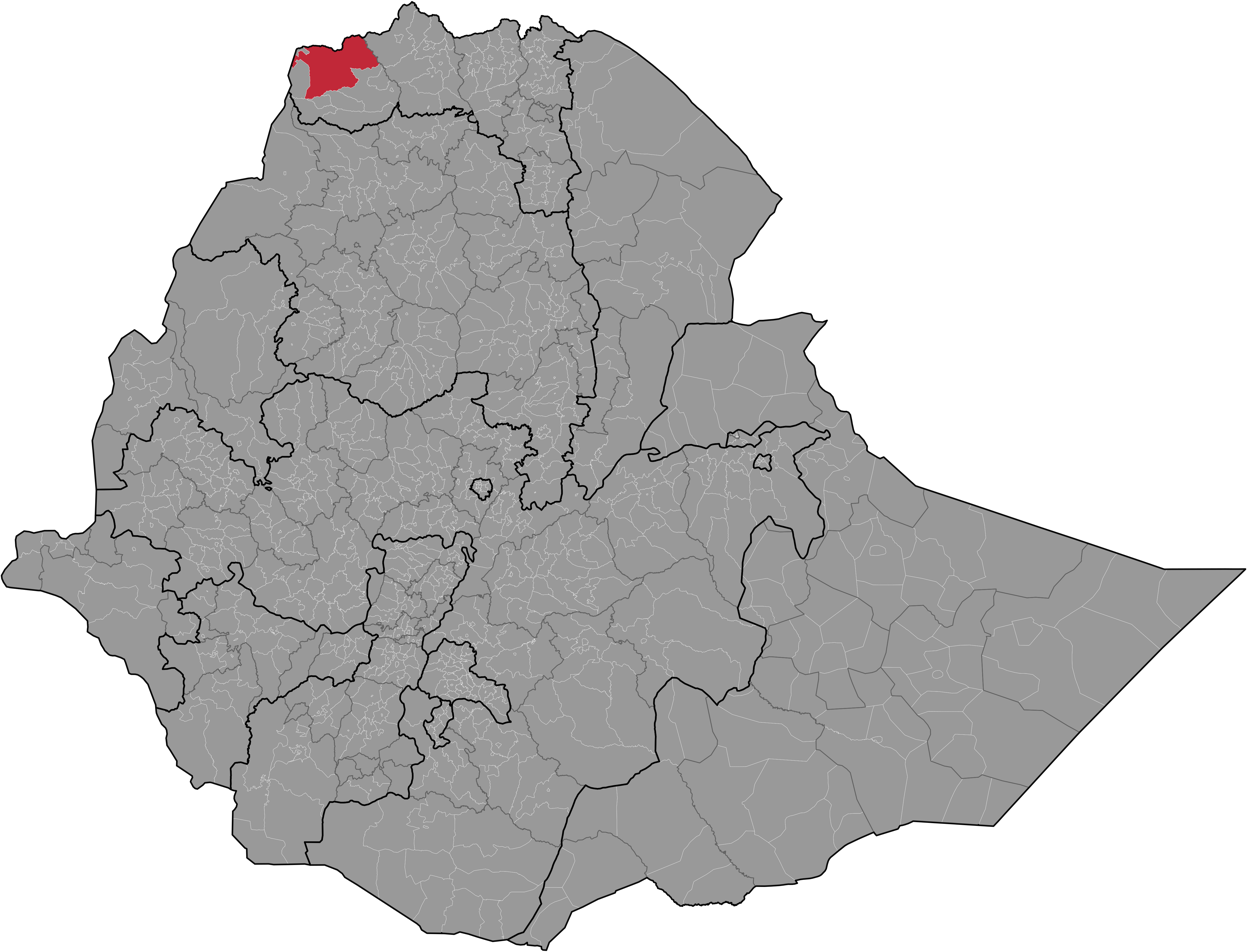
- Country: Ethiopia
- Zone: Western Zone

Area
  - Total: 4,542.33 km^{2} (1,753.80 sq mi)

Population (2007)
  - Total: 92,167

Kafta Humera (Tigrinya: ቃፍታ ሑመራ) (Amharic: ከፍታ ሁመራ) is a woreda in the disputed Western Zone. Kafta Humera is bordered on the south by Tsegede, on the west by Sudan, by the Tekezé River which separates Kafta Humera from Eritrea on the north, on the east by the North Western zone of the Tigray Region, and on the southeast by Welkait. Towns in Kafta Humera include Adi Hirdi and Humera.

== History ==
Prior to the Ethiopian Revolution, Kafta Humera was the site of a government program to provide land to landless peasants from Tigray and Eritrea. By the end of 1971, some 500 farmers occupied about 7,000 square kilometers, and a further 50,000 were employed as seasonal workers. Although the program was intended for landless citizens, much of the available land had been taken by absentee landlords from the aristocracy—one estimate is as high as 55% of all grants.

Kafta Humera, was selected by the Ministry of Agriculture and Rural Development in 2003 as an area for voluntary resettlement for farmers from overpopulated areas. Along with Tsegede woreda, the other woreda selected in Tigray that year, welcomed that year a total of 7334 heads of households and 618 total family members.

In August 2006, the Tekeze flooded Kafta Humera, displacing 450 households. However, subsequent visits by the UN Office for the Coordination of Humanitarian Affairs found no need for emergency services. In November of that year, a wild fire near the resettlement sites in Kafta Humera destroyed approximately 10 hectares of forest.

== Demographics ==
Based on the 2007 national census conducted by the Central Statistical Agency of Ethiopia (CSA), this woreda has a total population of 92,167, an increase of 48,690 over the 1994 census, of whom 47,909 are men and 44,258 women. With an area of 4,542.33 square kilometers, Kafta Humera has a population density of 20.29, which is less than the Zone average of 28.94 persons per square kilometer; 30,234 or 32.80% are urban inhabitants. A total of 23,449 households were counted in this woreda, resulting in an average of 3.93 persons to a household, and 22,259 housing units. The majority of the inhabitants said they practiced Ethiopian Orthodox Christianity, with 95.16% reporting that as their religion, while 4.7% of the population were Muslim.

The 1994 national census reported a total population for this woreda of 48,690 of whom 25,456 were men and 23,234 were women; 16,442 or 33.77% of its population were urban dwellers. The largest ethnic groups reported in Kafta Humera were the Tigrayans (86.26%), the Amharas (7.76%), and foreign residents from Eritrea (2.96%); all other ethnic groups made up 3.02% of the population. Tigrinya is spoken as a first language by 89.36%, and 7.74% speak Amharic; the remaining 2.9% spoke all other primary languages reported. 92.69% of the population said they were Ethiopian Orthodox Christianity, and 6.35% were Muslim. Concerning education, 19.28% of the population were considered literate, which is greater than the Zone average of 9.01%; 25.37% of children aged 7–12 were in primary school, which is greater than the Zone average of 11.34%; 1.89% of the children aged 13–14 were in junior secondary school, which is also greater than the Zone average of 0.65%; and 0.41% of children aged 15–18 were in senior secondary school, which is less than the Zone average of 0.51%. Concerning sanitary conditions, about 91% of the urban houses and 58% of all houses had access to safe drinking water at the time of the census; about 22% of the urban and 9% of all houses had toilet facilities.

== Agriculture ==
A sample enumeration performed by the CSA in 2001 interviewed 11,606 farmers in this woreda, who held an average of 1.89 hectares of land. Of the 21,950 hectares of private land surveyed in Kafta Humera, 93.19% was under cultivation, 0.03% pasture, 4.85% fallow, 0.73% woodland, and 1.19% was devoted to other uses. For the land under cultivation in this woreda, 31.24% is planted in cereals, 0.94% in pulses, 60.87% in oilseeds, and 0.03% in vegetables. The number of hectares planted in fruit trees is missing. 68.8% of the farmers both raise crops and livestock, while 27.97% only grow crops and 3.23% only raise livestock. Land tenure in this woreda is distributed amongst 74.74% owning their land, 25.09% renting, and those holding their land under other forms of tenure 0.17%.

The economy of this woreda is centered on the production of sesame, which by 1996 replaced cotton as the primary cash crop. Sesame is a high-value edible oil that is exported to Israel, Turkey, the Middle East, Japan and China. Over 400 large-scale investors cultivate an average 600 hectares of sesame, while local farmers cultivate up to 12 hectares each. Investors cultivate 58% of the 186,000 hectares of cultivable land, and local farmers the remaining 42%. Sesame production is labor-intensive, especially during the weeding and harvesting period, attracting an average of 200,000 workers from the rest of the Tigray Region, northern Amhara, and Sudan each year. Another important crop in Kafta Humera is sorghum, which both investment and local farmers cultivate as both a cash and a food crop.

== 2020 woreda reorganisation ==
In 2020, woreda Kafta Humera became inoperative and its territory belongs to the following new woredas:

- Kafta Humera(new, smaller, woreda)
- May Kadra woreda
- Setit Humera woreda
- Humera town
