= Dansha =

Town in Tigray Region, Ethiopia

- Town
- Tigrinya: ዳንሽሃ
- Location in Tigray and Ethiopia Dansha (Ethiopia)
- Coordinates: 13°31′00″N 37°10′59″E
- Country: Ethiopia
- Region: Tigray
- Zone: Mi'irabawi Zone
- Woreda: Tsegede
- Time zone: UTC+3 (EAT)

Dansha is a town in Tigray Region, located in the northwestern part of the country.

== History ==
On July 7, 1988, during the Ethiopian Civil War, the Ethiopia government's Third Revolutionary Army's 603 Army Corps was ambushed by the Tigray People's Liberation Front (TPLF) as it was leaving its base at Dansha, resulting in around 2,000 government casualties.

Dansha was part of Begemder Province until the 1987 Constitution of Ethiopia divided the country into regions on September 18, 1987, at which time Dansha became a part of North Gonder Region. When the current regions were formed in 1992 after the Ethiopian Civil War, Dansha became part of the Tigray Region.

During the 4 November Northern Command Attacks, forces loyal to the TPLF attacked the Fifth Battalion of the Northern Command of the Ethiopian National Defense Force in Dansha. This was one of the primary causes of the Tigray war. The clashes that ensued resulted in significant destruction to the town.

== Transportation ==
Dansha is served by Dansha Airport, five miles (8.0 km) northwest of the town. Dansha is located on the main road between Gondar and Humera.
