= Humera Airport =

Airport in Humera, & Tigray Region, Ethiopia

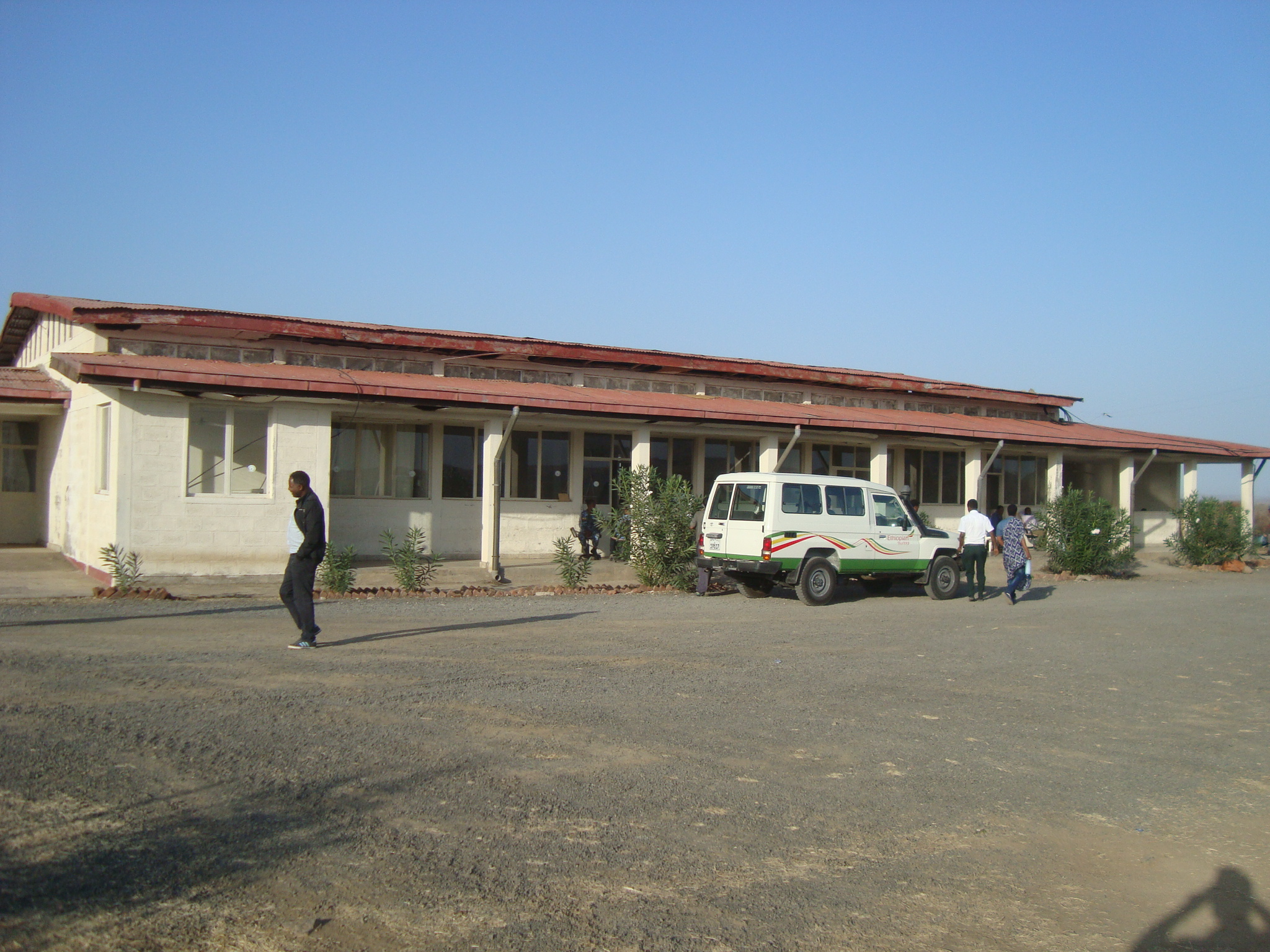
- IATA: HUE; ICAO: HAHU

Summary
- Airport type: Public
- Owner: Ethiopian Civil Aviation Authority
- Operator: Ethiopian Airports Enterprise
- Serves: Humera, Ethiopia
- Coordinates: 13°49′49″N 036°52′54″E

Map
- Location in Ethiopia (specifically in Tigray which is highlighted in red)

Runways
Direction	Length		Surface
Direction	m	ft	Surface
13/31	3,000	9,843	Asphalt

Humera Airport (IATA: HUE, ICAO: HAHU) is a public airport serving Humera, a town in the Tigray Region of northern Ethiopia. The name of the city and airport may also be transliterated as Himera or Himora.

Humera Airport is located at 13°49′49″N 036°52′54″E, which is 59 km (37 miles) southeast of Humera (14°18′N 036°37′E). Humera's current airport opened in July 2009. It was constructed by the Ethiopian Airports Enterprise over a three-year period, at a cost of over 182 million birr (about 16 million U.S. dollars based on the July 2009 exchange rates).

== Tigray War ==
On 10 November 2020 during the Tigray War, the Ethiopian National Defense Force (ENDF) took over control of the airport from the Tigray Defense Forces. As of 23 November 2020, Humera town itself was run by Amhara regional administrative and military forces.

== Facilities ==
Humera Airport has one runway, which measures 3,000 by 45 metres (9,843 ft × 148 ft).

== Airlines and destinations ==
Airlines	Destinations
Ethiopian Airlines	Mek'ele
