= Western Zone =

Zone in Ethiopia

Coordinates: 13°45′N 37°00′E

- Zone
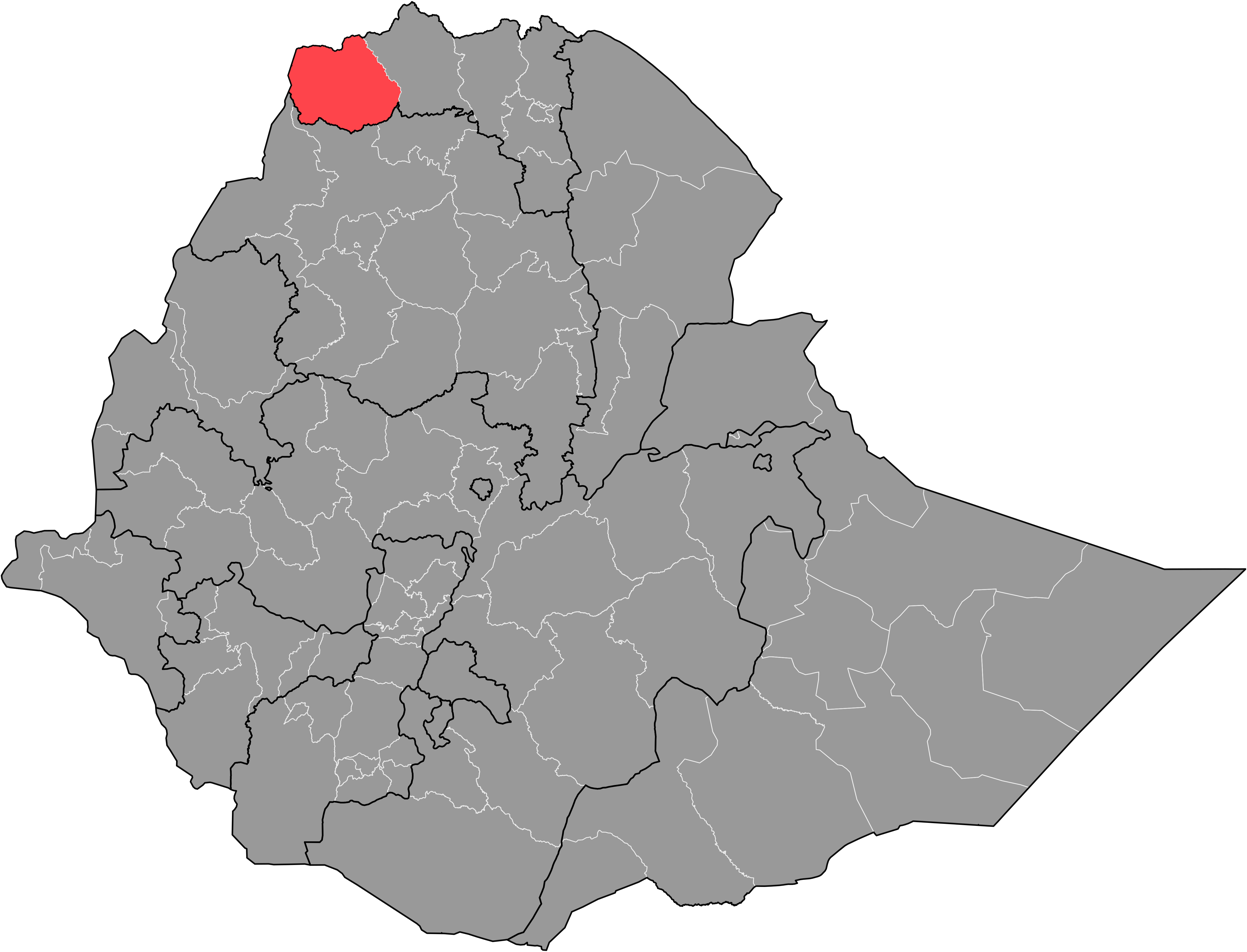
- Western Zone location in Ethiopia
- Country: Ethiopia
- Largest city: Humera

Area
  - Total: 12,323.35 km^{2} (4,758.07 sq mi)

Population (2012 est.)
  - Total: 407,560
  - Density: 33.072/km^{2} (85.657/sq mi)

The Western Zone (Tigrinya: ዞባ ምዕራብ) (Amharic: መእራባዊ ዞን) is a disputed zone that lies between the Amhara Region and Tigray Region of Ethiopia. The main contestants claiming authority over the Western Zone are the Tigray People's Liberation Front (TPLF) and the Amhara Regional Government / FANO-linked groups in control of the zone. It is subdivided into three woredas (districts); from north to south they are Kafta Humera, Welkait and Tsegede (also known as Tegede in Amharic). The largest town is Humera. The Western Zone is bordered on the east by the North Western Zone of the Tigray Region, on the south by the North Gondar Zone of the Amhara Region, the west by Sudan and on the north by Eritrea.

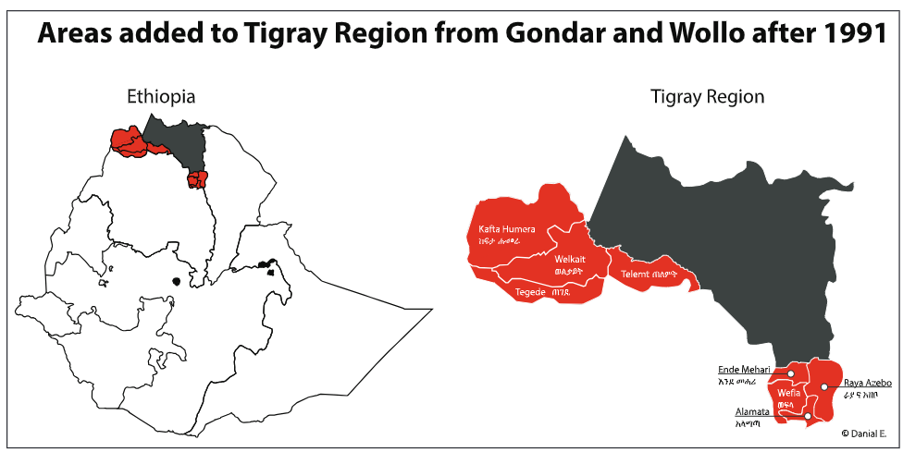
Welkait Map prior to 1991 incorporation

Since November 2020, as part of the Tigray War, the administration of the Western Zone was taken over by officials from the Amhara Region.

== History ==
The toponym Welkait appears only in relatively recent sources. The archaeological evidence (presence of Muslim cemeteries), as well as local traditions, suggest that Welkait, thinly populated by non-Semitic speakers (likely the Shanqella or Agaw), was once under the Muslim domination of the Balaw or the Funj people. Under the reign of Baeda Maryam I, tradition speaks of Ras Degana of Shire, accompanied by Bolay, Tesfay (Qasta Agam), Shakkor, Zena Gabriel, and others who settled the region and divided Welkait among themselves, founding lineages and settlements. In the mid 16th century, Welkait was under the domain of a powerful Muslim queen known as Ga'ewa.

In the 17th century, Welkait appears as a separate province, said to have previously been part of Begemder but later separated from it. From the 17th to 18th centuries, the powerful governor of Welkait, and a good friend of Emperor Iyasu I, Dejazmach Ayana Egziy is well-known in the historical record. He was allegedly a descendant of Ras Degana of Shire, the first Christian settler of the region. Emperor Yostos had allowed three Capuchins to stay in Welkait under Ayana Egziy's protection, but in 1716, under Dawit III, they were brought to Gondar and stoned to death. These Capuchins may be linked to the ruins of a large structure in Welkait, near today’s May Gaba, which shows features of Gondarine architectural style. Emperor Bakaffa had a good relationship with Ayana Egziy and used Welkait as a place of exile for his enemies. However, in 1725, a break occurred when Mammo of Sallamt was appointed over Bambello Melash. He then had a conflict with Ayana Egziy and killed him in 1731, likely in a struggle for power.

In 1749, the governor of Welkait was dispatched to assist Mikael Sehul during his conflict with Dejazmach Walde of Lasta. That same year, a rebel named Késade was defeated in Welkait. The following year, Cerqin Nacco was appointed governor of both Welkait and Tegede, and in 1754, Surahe Krestos took over the role. By 1781, Emperor Tekle Giyorgis I fought the rebellious local ruler Dejazmach Gadlu and forced him into submission. When Mansfield Parkyns passed through Welkait, it was governed by Leul Hailu under Wube Haile Maryam, who had inherited the position from his father Haile Maryam Gebre. By the late 1850s, Welkait was under the control of Negue Wolde Mikael. In the 1860s, it was ruled by the rebellious Téso Gobeze until he was killed by Wagshum Gobeze. Emperor Yohannes IV asserted control over Welkait in 1873, though it fell into the hands of a rebellious leader a few years later.

Welkait was historically its own province until 1944 when it was incorporated into Begmeder. This decision by Haile Selassie aimed to punish Tigray for the Woyane rebellion. With ample rainfall and rivers like the Tekezze, Angereb, Kaza, and Arina and their tributaries, northern Gondar had become a surplus-producing region, the surplus exported largely to Eritrea.

During the Ethiopian Civil War, Welkait became the base of the Ethiopian Democratic Union (EDU) and later the Tigray People's Liberation Front (TPLF). Gebru Tareke describes the strategic importance of this region:

The region was a well-watered expanse of fertile plains encircled by towering mountains and deep ravines. More than half of the population spoke Tigrinya, while a significant portion of the rest were bilingual, speaking both Amharic and Tigrinya. The people were renowned for their dissident culture, inhabiting a peripheral zone where outlaws often sought refuge, and state officials were reluctant to venture. The locals were famously fond of firearms. It was here, for example, that the American M-16 assault rifle earned the nickname Imiye, or "Mother-16." The area was remote, isolated, and relatively inaccessible to the military, making it far easier to defend than to conquer from both a topographical and cultural perspective.

Following the fall of the communist Derg regime and ascension to power of the Tigray People's Liberation Front, the region incorporated into the Tigray Region due to its historical ties to the Tigrayan people.

Following the incorporation of the area into the Tigray region, a mass effort was undertaken to re-populate the area with Tigrayan ethnic migrants while displacing the local population. Various steps were taken to dramatically change the demographic make up of the region including, resettling Tigrayans from food-insecure areas of Tigray as well as Tigrayan refugees from Sudan, which led to the dispossession of land from the farming population. As a result of these efforts, this led to the rise of the Welkait Committee led by Demeke Zewdu. In the mid-2010s, small agricultural investors who did not meet the 20-hectare threshold for investor status had their land taken and redistributed to larger investors from other parts of Tigray, while some were displaced by the Welkait Sugar Factory, a major state company linked to the TPLF. This led to discontentment as many of the local "Wolqayte" landowning families expressed support for the Welkait Committee and began to distinguish themselves from the resettled Tigrayans, the nascent division between these resettled people and people who could claim ancestry in Welkait widened, and was used by Amhara nationalists to intensify their claims over the region.

=== Ethnic cleansing of Tigrayans ===
During the Tigray War, militias from the Amhara Region took control of most parts of the Western Zone in November 2020, which was then occupied for a duration by the joint Ethiopian and Eritrean armies. Human Rights Watch (HRW) described this as "represent[ing] a violent reversal of changes to Ethiopia's contested internal boundaries enacted by the TPLF-led Ethiopian federal government in 1992", and after human rights abuses over many years by Tigrayan security forces against ethnic Amharas and Walqaytes, (Note: Walqayte refers to a group of people historically inhabiting the highland areas of Welkait, who speak Tigrinya and Amharic.) serving as a backdrop to the eventual violence and expulsion of Tigrayan communities.

Humera, Addi Remets and Dansha were virtually depopulated, with numerous shops closed, some of them subjected to looting. Any traces of a Tigrinya-speaking administration were deliberately erased. Tigrinya-written signs, including those on private hotels and shops, were repainted. Many houses were destroyed during the fighting, however, others were deliberately set on fire after the conflict ceased. Many Tigrayan communities, facing intimidation, fled east, towards central Tigray. Officials from the provisional administration then actively encouraged people from Gondar areas to settle in, offering free houses to those with connections to the new administration. In contrast to towns with majority Tigrayan populations, The New York Times reports that towns in the zone with majority Amhara populations were "thriving, with bustling shops, bars and restaurants."

On 17 March 2021, the Transitional Government of Tigray’s communication head, Etenesh Nigusse, claimed on VOA Tigrigna that more than 700,000 Tigrayans have been forcibly removed by Amhara forces from the Western Zone Western Tigray, further claiming that the entire population of the Western Zone now stands at around 400,000. Gizachew Muluneh, head of Amhara Regional Communication Affairs, disputed this, arguing that Etenesh's figures were too high. During the occupation, multiple atrocities were committed by Eritrean, Amara and Ethiopian forces.

French researcher Mehdi Labzaé documented the rise of Amhara nationalism since 2015/6 and managed to interview several actors involved in the annexation and ethnic cleansing campaign in Tigray since November 2020. In his article, he lists a series of massacres carried out in Western Tigray after the Amhara region annexed it in November 2020. Mass violence was not his initial research object, but he states, "my investigation of the massacres stems from an exploration of the agrarian grounds for Amhara nationalism." From his research, he concludes that "These accounts show how the successive massacres took place as part of a deliberate policy implemented by the Fano, Amhara Regional Special Forces, and Welkait Committee – Prosperity Party administration of the Wolqayt-Tegedé-Setit-Humera zone, the with the complicity of Eritrean troops and at least implicit backing of the ENDF. The context, modus operandi and what perpetrators told the victim all converge towards the fact that the intentional targeting of civilians served the purpose of freeing land for occupying Amhara forces. Killing civilians would scare the remaining Tigrayans and make them flee. However, on many occasions, Tigrayans were prevented to leave, as having them in the zone was also a lucrative business for Fano who could regularly ransom them."

== Demographics ==
A map of the regions and zones of Ethiopia

Based on the 2007 census conducted by the Central Statistical Agency of Ethiopia (CSA), this zone has a total population of 356,598, of whom 182,571 are men and 174,027 women; 71,823 or 20.14% are urban inhabitants. The two largest ethnic groups reported in the Western Zone were Tigrayan (92.28%) and Amhara (6.48%); all other ethnic groups made up 1.24% of the population. Tigrinya is spoken as a first language by 86.73%, and Amharic by 12.18%; the remaining 1.09% spoke all other primary languages reported. A total of 96.25% of the population said they were Orthodox Christians, and 3.68% were Muslim.

At the time of the 1994 national census, the Western Zone included the six woredas that were split off in 2005 to form the new the North Western Zone. That census reported a total population of 733,962, of whom 371,198 were males and 362,764 females; 84,560 or 11.5% of its population were urban dwellers. The inhabitants of the zone were predominantly Tigrayan, at 91.5% of the population, while 4.3% were Amhara, 3.5% foreign residents from Eritrea, and 0.2% Kunama; all other ethnic groups accounted for 0.5% of the population. Tigrinya was spoken as a first language by 94.45% of the inhabitants, and Amharic by 4.85%; the remaining 0.7% spoke all other primary languages reported. 96.28% of the population said they were Orthodox Christians, and 3.51% were Muslim. Concerning education in the Zone, 9.01% of the population were considered literate; 11.34% of children aged 7–12 were in primary school, while 0.65% of the children aged 13–14 were in junior secondary school, and 0.51% of children aged 15–18 were in senior secondary school. Concerning sanitary conditions, about 63% of the urban houses and 18% of all houses had access to safe drinking water at the time of the census; about 19% of the urban and 5% of the total had toilet facilities.

Eike Haberland Map (Published: Wiesbaden : Steiner, 1965) Shows that by 14C Amharic was spoken at Central Ethiopia very far from Western Tigray while Tigrigna was spoken in the North in what is now called Tigray. Furthermore, the 1994 census report indicates that 96.5% of the inhabitants of western Tigray were ethnically Tigrayans while only 3% were Amhara, which changed to 92.3% and 6.5% respectively in the 2007 census.

Belgian researches analyzed list of 574 place names as recorded by Ellero and his translators was extracted from the notebooks of ethnographer Giovanni Ellero, holding field notes from Welkait in the 1930s. The etymology of almost all place names is of Tigrinya origin, with a few of Oromo, Falasha, Arab, or biblical origin. Less than ten locations that held a name of Amharic origin in 1939 are found in the whole list of place names. Specifically, among the 574 place names, there are 229 "’Addi …" (village in Tigrinya) and 49 "May …" (water).

According to a 24 May 2004 World Bank memorandum, 6% of the inhabitants of the Western Zone have access to electricity, and this zone has a road density of 23.3 kilometers per 1000 square kilometers. Rural households have an average of 1 hectare of land (compared to the national average of 1.01 and a regional average of 0.51) and an average 1.3 head of livestock. 19.9% of the population is in non-farm related jobs, compared to the national average of 25% and a regional average of 28%. Of all eligible children, 55% are enrolled in primary school, and 16% in secondary schools. 100% of the zone is exposed to malaria. The memorandum gave this zone a drought risk rating of 533.
