= Humera =

Town in Tigray Region, Ethiopia

Humera ሑመራ
- Town
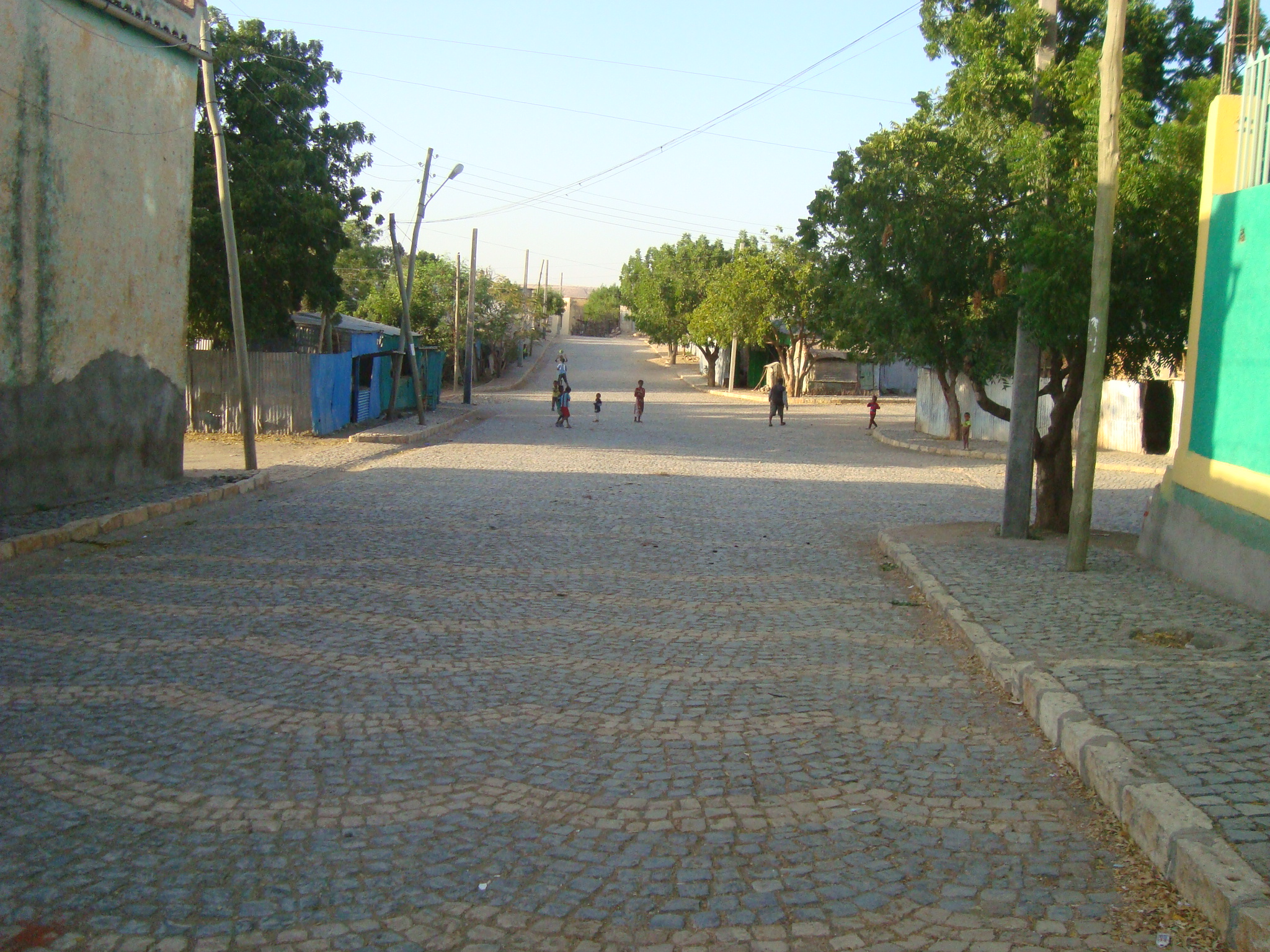

- Location within Ethiopia Location within the Horn of Africa Location within Africa
- Coordinates: 14°17′10″N 36°36′35″E
- Country: Ethiopia
- Region: Tigray
- Zone: Western
- Woreda: Kafta Humera
- Elevation: 585 m (1,919 ft)

Population (2007)
  - Total: 21,653
- Time zone: UTC+3 (EAT)

Humera (Tigrinya: ሑመራ; Amharic: ሁመራ) is a town in northwestern Ethiopia. It is located in the Kafta Humera district in the Tigray Region of Ethiopia as well as the Western Zone of Tigray, and has an elevation of 585 metres (1,919 ft) above sea level. The Tekezé river borders the town to the north. Humera is a vital regional agricultural center based on intensive agriculture, and is the last Ethiopian town south of the border with Eritrea and Sudan, and is considered to be a strategically important gateway to Sudan.

== History ==
=== 20th century ===
Prior to the Ethiopian Revolution, large agricultural businesses were established to grow soybean and other crops for export. By 1971, there were 700,000 hectares being farmed.

Humera is part of the Wolqayt-Tsegede area, which historically has been part of the former province of Semien also commonly known as Gondar. During the Ethiopian Civil War, Teranafit and its successor, the Ethiopian Democratic Union (EDU), drew much of their support from the commercial farmers of Humera and Wolqayit, and gained control of Humera in early 1977; Derg forces with tanks and armored cars retook Humera on 10 June, and the officers of the EDU fled to Sudan. The Derg used Humera as a base for military campaigns against the Tigrayan People's Liberation Front (TPLF) until their Third Revolutionary Army was crushed in the Battle of Shire on 19 February 1989; this forced the government to withdraw its garrison at Humera a few days later, and by the end of the month evacuate Tigray entirely. The TPLF then took control of the area, and created a supply line out of reach of the Derg.

On 26 March 1989, Humera was bombed from the air by the Ethiopian Air Force.

In the first few months after the beginning of the Eritrean-Ethiopian War, most of the population fled south to the villages of Ba'eker (11,000), May Kedra (5,000), and Bereket (4,000). These refugees later returned to Humera.

=== 21st century ===
On 13 March 2008, a bomb exploded on a public bus in Humera, which killed eight people and wounded at least 27 more. The government arrested the alleged perpetrators, who testified in court they had acted on behalf of dissident groups supported by Eritrea. Their trial was still in process at the end of the year.

In November 2020, the town was shelled during the Tigray War. The Humera massacre of ethnic Tigrayans took place. Responsibility for the massacre was attributed by refugees to Amharan militias, including Fano, and to the Ethiopian National Defense Force (ENDF). Most inhabitants fled. Administration of the town was taken over by officials from Amhara Region. In 2021, people were found having been tortured, tied up and thrown in the Tekeze River.

== Demographics ==
Based on the 2007 Census conducted by the Central Statistical Agency of Ethiopia (CSA), this town has a total population of 21,653, of whom 11,395 are men and 10,258 women; this is an increase of 14,451 over the 1994 national census. With an area of 153.03 square kilometers, Humera has a population density of 141.50. A total of 49.84% households were counted in this woreda, resulting in an average of 6,360 persons to a household, and 3.40 housing units. The majority of the inhabitants said they practiced Ethiopian Orthodox Christianity, with 93.18% reporting that as their religion, while 6.45% of the population were Muslim.

Ethnic demographics of Kafta Humera woreda

Ethnicity	Number	Percentage
Agew/Awingi	242	0.5%
Amhara	3780	7.8%
Kunama	638	1.3%
Tigrayan	41999	86.3%
Eritreans	1439	3.0%
Others	592	1.2%
Total	48690	

== Geography ==
Humera is located in northwestern Ethiopia. By road it is 984 km (611 mi) northwest of Addis Ababa, 515 km (320 mi) west of Mek'ele, and 267 km (166 mi) east of Shire. The Tekezé river runs to the west of Humera. The town is spread on the east bank of the river. Humera is located at altitude ranges from 585 m above sea level.

=== Climate ===
Humera has a hot semi-arid climate (Köppen climate classification BSh). The overall climate throughout the year is mild and dry. The annual rainfall ranges between 400 and 600 mm, with most of the rain falling in the rainy season (June up to September).

Climate data for Humera, Tigray, Ethiopia
Month	Jan	Feb	Mar	Apr	May	Jun	Jul	Aug	Sep	Oct	Nov	Dec	Year
Mean daily maximum °C (°F)	36.4 (97.5)	37.9 (100.2)	41.2 (106.2)	41.7 (107.1)	41.2 (106.2)	39.2 (102.6)	33.9 (93.0)	33 (91)	34.2 (93.6)	37.4 (99.3)	38.3 (100.9)	36.9 (98.4)	37.6 (99.7)
Daily mean °C (°F)	27 (81)	28.4 (83.1)	30.3 (86.5)	31.7 (89.1)	31.7 (89.1)	30.3 (86.5)	27.1 (80.8)	26.8 (80.2)	27.2 (81.0)	28.7 (83.7)	29.4 (84.9)	28.3 (82.9)	28.9 (84.1)
Mean daily minimum °C (°F)	17.5 (63.5)	18.8 (65.8)	22.2 (72.0)	21.6 (70.9)	22.2 (72.0)	21.3 (70.3)	20.3 (68.5)	20.6 (69.1)	20 (68)	20 (68)	20.5 (68.9)	19.6 (67.3)	20.4 (68.7)
Average rainfall mm (inches)	0 (0)	0 (0)	0 (0)	1 (0.0)	45 (1.8)	72 (2.8)	171 (6.7)	195 (7.7)	123 (4.8)	7 (0.3)	6 (0.2)	0 (0)	620 (24.3)
Source: http://www.levoyageur.net/weather-city-HUMERA.html

== Economy ==
The population increases dramatically during the farming season each year, when migrant workers arrive from all over the country. Sesame, sorghum, and Arabic gum are among the most common crops.

== Transport ==
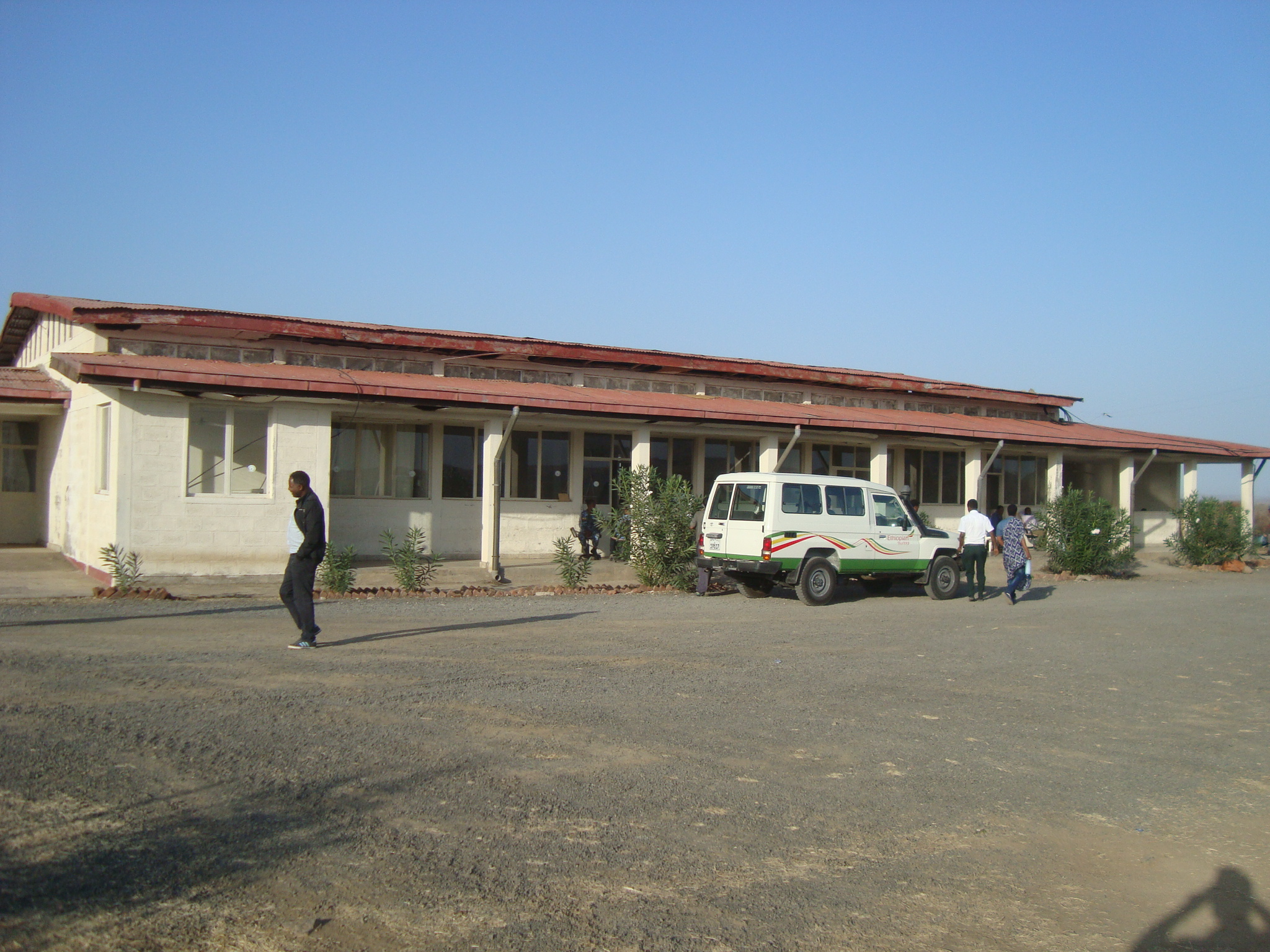
Humera Airport

The town is served by Humera Airport. Although it wasn't operational due to a border dispute, on 26 July 2009 after three years of construction by the Ethiopian Airports Enterprise, the airport was officially reopened. A runway three kilometers long and 45 meters wide was constructed, capable of handling present-day aircraft including Antonov 124s. The airport was opened at the cost of 182 million birr. Ethiopian Airlines serves the airport with destinations to Addis Ababa and Mek'ele. The opening of the airport was aimed at increasing the agricultural sector in the region as well as providing commercial air service in Humera.

== See also ==
- Humera massacre
- Fano (militia)
- Tigray conflict
