= Addi Remets =

Adi Remets ዓዲ ረመፅ Adi Remets
- Town
- Location in Ethiopia
- Coordinates: 13°45′N 37°19′E
- Country: Ethiopia
- Region: Tigray
- Zone: Western Zone
- Woreda: Welkait
- Elevation: 1,870 m (6,140 ft)

Population (2007)
  - Total: 5,203
- Time zone: UTC+3 (EAT)

Adi Remets (Tigrinya: ዓዲ ረመፅ), is a town in the Tigray Region of Ethiopia. Located in the Western Zone of the Tigray Region, this town has a latitude and longitude of 13°45′N 37°19′E with an elevation of 1870 meters above sea level. It is the administrative center of the Welkait woreda.

== Demographics ==
Based on the 2007 Census conducted by the Central Statistical Agency of Ethiopia (CSA), this town has a total population of 5,203, of whom 2,446 are men and 2,757 women. A total of 1,481 households were counted in this woreda, resulting in an average of 3.51 persons to a household, and 1,432 housing units. The 1994 census reported it had a total population of 2,497 in 670 households and living in 670 houses.
