= Amhara nationalism =

Ethnic nationalism

Amhara nationalism is a form of ethnonationalism and political movement that advocates for and advances the interests of Amhara people in Ethiopia, asserting that Amhara designates a single, secular nation with an ethno-cultural identity unique to itself. The movement broadly emerged as a counter discourse of modern Ethiopian politics, which is based on a thesis of national oppression.

The flag of Ethiopia has been historically associated with Amhara nationalism.

Sometimes, this type of nationalism associated with pan-Ethiopian nationalism which is a form of civic nationalism. Some see it as a symbol of patriotism over Ethiopians while other portray this nationalism as maintaining Amhara political and territorial identity. For example, Amhara youth tend to relate with ethnic and political identity compared to older generation who are more likely to express a pan-Ethiopian stance.

== Historical perspectives ==
Historically, Amhara nationalism was correlated with Ethiopian nationalism, which supports civic nationalism across Ethiopian ethnic groups. In early 1992, All Amhara People's Organization (AAPO) was founded by Professor Asrat Woldeyes to represent Amhara as one identity. The Amhara National Democratic Movement (ANDM) similarly followed this stance after being formed by Amharan prisoners of war with the help of TPLF-dominated EPRDF coalition before the fall of the Derg. Amhara peasants remained without any formal political organization as both AAPO and ANDM represented the urban population of Amhara, claiming they stood for Amhara sovereignty.

== Comparison with Ethiopian nationalism ==
The Amhara people are often viewed by external observers as a symbol of Ethiopian patriotism and linked with Ethiopian nationalism. In contrast, the ethnic federalist EPRDF are viewed by Ethiopian nationalists, including the Amhara nationalist and elites, as "unpatriotic" or even treacherous. However, some Amhara nationalists claim they are democratic within the ethnic federal state since they grant self-determination to minority groups in the region, such as in Oromia and Agew Awi.

The Derg regime was often portrayed as the continuation of Amhara imperial government despite Amharas being subjected to grave brutality. Taffara Deguefe, the President of the Commercial Bank of Ethiopia wrote a memoir titled The Tripping Stone in his prison cell that described discrimination against Amhara during the regime:

The only ‘minorities’ who are scorned are the hopeless Amhara for their past privileges. They have to pay for it now in lost jobs and positions for their hateful identification to a past now seen as distasteful to the military junta.

Under the Derg, the Ethiopian military was dominated by the Amhara ethnic group. Similar to the period of the Ethiopian Empire under Menelik II and Haile Selassie, over 80% of generals and over 65% of colonels in the armed forces were Amhara, according to Ethiopian historian Gebru Tareke. Many Ethiopians viewed the revolution as a mask to perpetuate Amhara domination. In 1978 the proportion of Amhara officials in the government of Ethiopia was higher than it had ever been - even under Menelik. By 1980, the original 120 members of the Derg had been cut down to only 38. All members except for three were ethnic Amhara and were predominantly from settler colonialist neftenya origins. Many member of the ruling elite were deeply opposed to the idea of loosening control on the rebellious southern regions conquered under Menelik II.

The Welkait controversy has been important for Amhara nationalism. During the first months of Tigray War, Amhara forces recaptured the town. The Fano movement is an ethno-nationalist protest movement that claims to represent Amhara people, which gained widespread support in Ethiopia. They are closely tied to the notion of "Ethiopianness" as linked to the Ethiopian Orthodox Tewahedo Church, claiming that Amhara is suffering from government persecution.

== See also ==
- Ethiopian nationalism
- Fano (militia)
- Persecution of Amhara people
