= Welkait =

Disputed district in northwestern Ethiopia

Welkait ወልቃይት Wolkait
- Woreda
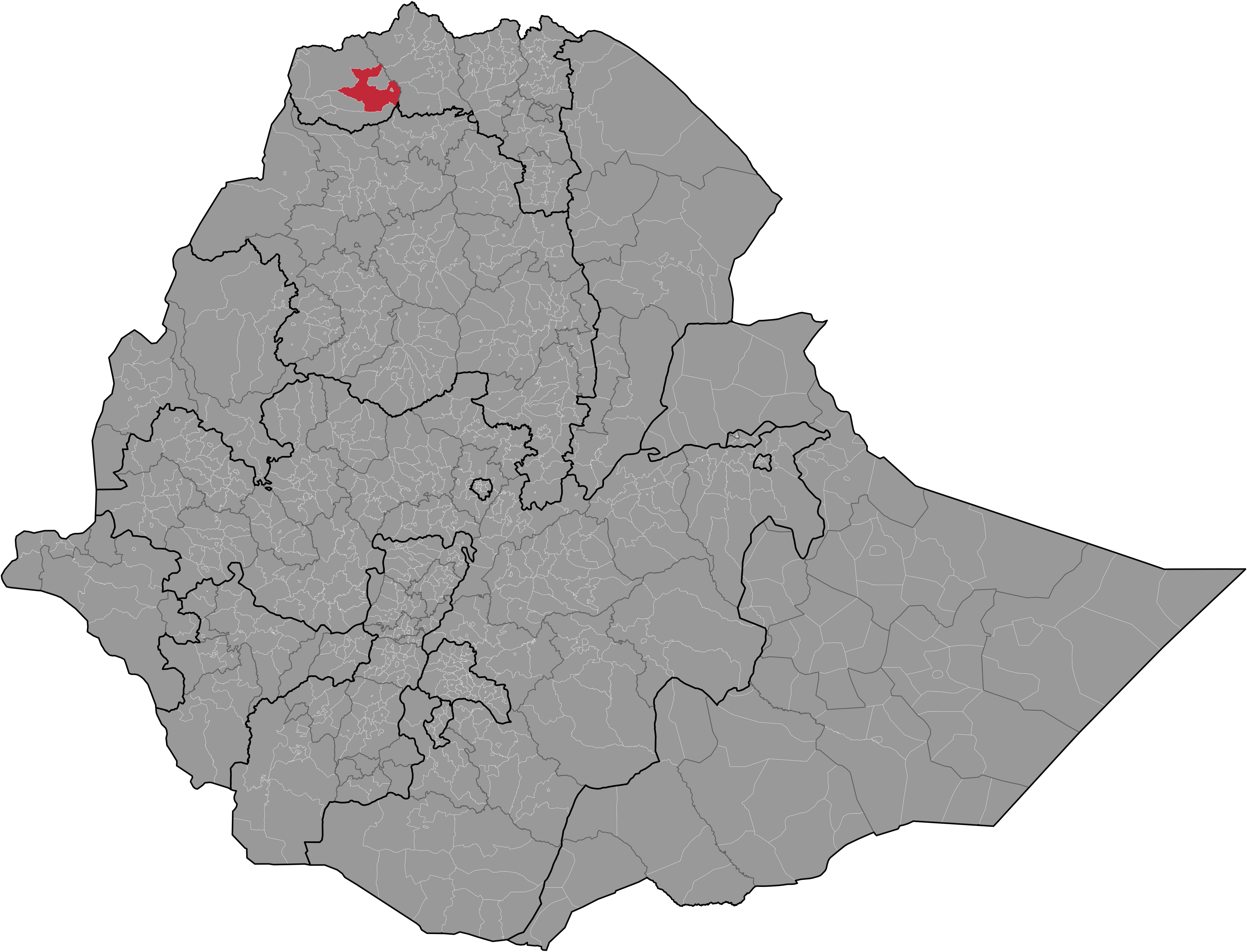
- Welkait highlighted in red
- Country: Ethiopia

Area
  - Total: 3,374.52 km^{2} (1,302.91 sq mi)

Population (2007)
  - Total: 138,926

Welkait (Amharic/Tigrinya: ወልቃይት) is a woreda in the Western Zone This woreda is bordered to the north by Humera and to the south by Tsegede. It is bordered on the east by the Semien Mi'irabawi Zone, Tigray Region, and on the south by the North Gondar Zone, Amhara Region. the woredas of Tahtay Adiyabo and Asgede Tsimbla lie to the north-east, on the other side of the Tekezé River, and Tselemti to the east. The administrative center of Welkait is Addi Remets; other towns in the woreda include Mai'gaba and Awura.

Map from 1935 with Welkait as its own region

== History ==
The toponym Welkait appears only in relatively recent sources. The archaeological evidence (presence of Muslim cemeteries), as well as local traditions, suggest that Welkait, thinly populated by non-Semitic speakers (likely the Shanqella or Agaw), was once under the Muslim domination of the Balaw or the Funj people. Under the reign of Baeda Maryam I, tradition speaks of Ras Degana of Shire, accompanied by Bolay, Tesfay (Qasta Agam), Shakkor, Zena Gabriel, and others who settled the region and divided Welkait among themselves, founding lineages and settlements. In the mid 16th century, Welkait was under the domain of a powerful Muslim queen known as Ga'ewa.

In the 17th century, Welkait appears as a separate province, said to have previously been part of Begemder but later separated from it. From the 17th to 18th centuries, the powerful governor of Welkait, and a good friend of Emperor Iyasu I, Dejazmach Ayana Egziy is well-known in the historical record. He was allegedly a descendant of Ras Degana of Shire, the first Christian settler of the region. Emperor Yostos had allowed three Capuchins to stay in Welkait under Ayana Egziy's protection, but in 1716, under Dawit III, they were brought to Gondar and stoned to death. These Capuchins may be linked to the ruins of a large structure in Welkait, near today’s May Gaba, which shows features of Gondarine architectural style. Emperor Bakaffa had a good relationship with Ayana Egziy and used Welkait as a place of exile for his enemies. However, in 1725, a break occurred when Mammo of Sallamt was appointed over Bambello Melash. He then had a conflict with Ayana Egziy and killed him in 1731, likely in a struggle for power.

In 1749, the governor of Welkait was dispatched to assist Mikael Sehul during his conflict with Dejazmach Walde of Lasta. That same year, a rebel named Késade was defeated in Welkait. The following year, Cerqin Nacco was appointed governor of both Welkait and Tegede, and in 1754, Surahe Krestos took over the role. By 1781, Emperor Tekle Giyorgis I fought the rebellious local ruler Dejazmach Gadlu and forced him into submission. When Mansfield Parkyns passed through Welkait, it was governed by Leul Hailu under Wube Haile Maryam, who had inherited the position from his father Haile Maryam Gebre. By the late 1850s, Welkait was under the control of Negue Wolde Mikael. In the 1860s, it was ruled by the rebellious Téso Gobeze until he was killed by Wagshum Gobeze. Emperor Yohannes IV asserted control over Welkait in 1873, though it fell into the hands of a rebellious leader a few years later.

Welkait was historically its own province until 1944 when it was incorporated into Begmeder. This decision by Haile Selassie aimed to punish Tigray for the Woyane rebellion. The uprising, led by Tigrayan peasants, was a response to Haile Selassie's plans to centralize power in Ethiopia around the government in Shewa, which went against the Tigrayan people's desire for self-determination. Following the fall of the communist Derg regime and ascension to power of the Tigray People's Liberation Front, the region incorporated into the Tigray Region due to its historical ties to the Tigrayan people.

== Demographics ==
The ethnic make up of the region is widely disputed. This question was intensified with its incorporation into the Tigray region by the TPLF. According to a demographic analysis done by the Derg regime about the population of the larger Begmeder province, the population of Welkait in 1984 was 221,692 residents. The same analysis stated that the Tigrayan population of Begmeder was 190,183 people, which made Tigrayans the second largest ethnicity. The American sociologist and author Donald N. Levine and the Kenyan politician Peter Anyang' Nyong'o both, prior to Welkait's incorporation into the Tigray region claimed that Welkait was ethnically and linguistically Tigrayan with their respective works.

Following the incorporation of the area into the Tigray region, a mass effort was undertaken to re-populate the area with Tigrayan ethnic migrants while displacing the local Amhara population. Various steps were taken to dramatically change the demographic make up of the region including, resettling Tigrayans from food-insecure areas of Tigray as well as Tigrayan refugees from Sudan, which led to the dispossession of land from the Amhara farming population. As a result of these efforts, this led to the rise of the Welkait Committee led by Demeke Zewdu. In the mid-2010s, small agricultural investors who did not meet the 20-hectare threshold for investor status had their land taken and redistributed to larger investors from other parts of Tigray, while some were displaced by the Welkait Sugar Factory, a major state company linked to the TPLF. This led to discontentment as many of the local "Wolqayte" landowning families expressed support for the Welkait Committee and began to distinguish themselves from the resettled Tigrayans, the nascent division between these resettled people and people who could claim ancestry in Welkait widened, and was used by Amhara nationalists.

Based on the 2007 census conducted by the Central Statistical Agency of Ethiopia (CSA), this woreda has a total population of 138,926, an increase of 90,186 over the 1994 national census, of whom 70,504 are men and 68,422 women; 10,758 or 7.74% are urban inhabitants. With an area of 3,374.52 km^{2} (1,302.91 sq mi), Wolqayt has a population density of 41.17 /km^{2}, which is greater than the Zone average of 28.94/km^{2}. A total of 30,375 households were counted in this woreda, resulting in an average of 4.57 persons in a household, and 29,336 housing units. The majority of the inhabitants said they practiced Ethiopian Orthodox Christianity, with 97.28% reporting that as their religion, while 2.71% of the population were Muslim.

The 1994 national census reported a total population for this woreda of 90,186, of whom 45,657 were men and 44,529 were women; 4,597 or 5.1% of its population were urban dwellers. The two largest ethnic groups reported in Wolqayt were the Tigrayan (96.58%), and the Amhara (3.03%); all other ethnic groups made up 0.39% of the population. Tigrinya is spoken as a first language by 97.14%, and 2.75% speak Amharic; the remaining 0.11% spoke all other primary languages reported. 96.75% of the population said they were Ethiopian Orthodox Christians, and 3.09% were Muslim. Concerning education, 3.9% of the population were considered literate, which is less than the Zone average of 9.01%; 3.36% of children aged 7–12 were in primary school, which is less than the Zone average of 11.34%; a negligible number of the children aged 13–14 were in junior secondary school, which is also less than the Zone average of 0.65%; and a negligible number of children aged 15–18 were in senior secondary school, which is less than the Zone average of 0.51%. Concerning sanitary conditions, about 1% of the urban houses and about 8% of all houses had access to safe drinking water at the time of the census; about 4% of the urban and about 4% of all houses had toilet facilities.

=== Ethnicity ===
Ethnic Group	1994 Census	2007 Census*
Tigrayan (Tigrinya) people	96.58%	93.52%
Amhara	3.03%	6.48%
Kunama	-	0.31%
Oromo	-	0.35%
Eritreans	0.21%	0.03%
Afar	0.02%	0.02%
Agaw	0.04%	0.10%
Irob	-	0.11%
Sudanese		0.07%

*Urban and Rural Mi'irabawi Zone statistics because none are available for Welkait specifically.

=== Mother Language ===
Language	1994 Census	2007 Census*
Tigrinya	97.14%	86.73%
Amharic	2.75%	12.18%
Afaan Oromo	0.01%	0.33%
Kunama	-	0.32%
Agaw	0.06%	0.09%

*Urban and Rural Mi'irabawi Zone statistics because none are available for Welkait specifically.

=== Religion ===
Religion	1994 Census	2007 Census
Orthodox Christian	96.75%	97.28%
Protestant	0.03%	-
Muslim	3.09%	2.71%

== Economy ==
=== Agriculture ===
A sample enumeration performed by the CSA in 2001 interviewed 24,417 farmers in this woreda, who held an average of 0.99 hectares of land. Of the 24,286 hectares of private land surveyed, over 86.69% was in cultivation, 1.27% pasture, 10.37% fallow, 0.03% in woodland, and 1.65% was devoted to other uses. For the land under cultivation in this woreda, 63.29% was planted in cereals, 4.19% in pulses, 18.24% in oilseeds, and 0.17% in vegetables is missing. The area planted in gesho was 25 hectares; the area in fruit trees is missing. 79.64% of the farmers both raised crops and livestock, while 10.96% only grew crops and 9.4% only raised livestock. Land tenure in this woreda is distributed amongst 73.93% owning their land, 25.09% renting, and 0.98% reported as holding their land under other forms of tenure. The intensive agriculture is necessary to feed people of the region due to the burgeoning human population, but continuing conversion of natural lands to agriculture is taking a toll on biodiversity in the area.

=== Sugar industry ===
The Ethiopian Sugar Corporation is building a sugar mill in Welkait region.

== Transportation ==
=== Ground Travel ===
In May 2010 construction was underway on a 98-kilometer road westwards from Adi Remets to Dejena Densha; construction of a road in the other direction, eastwards from Adi Remets to Dedebit in Asgede Tsimbla woreda, was awarded that month to Sur Construction for 801 million birr.

== 2020 woreda reorganisation ==
In 2020, Welkait woreda became inoperative and its territory belongs to the following new woredas:

- Welkait (new, smaller, woreda)
- Awra woreda
- Korarit woreda
- May Gaba town
