= Tsegede/Tegede =

District in Western Zone, Ethiopia

Coordinates: 13°30′N 37°10′E

Tsegede ጸገዴ or ጠገዴ
- Woreda
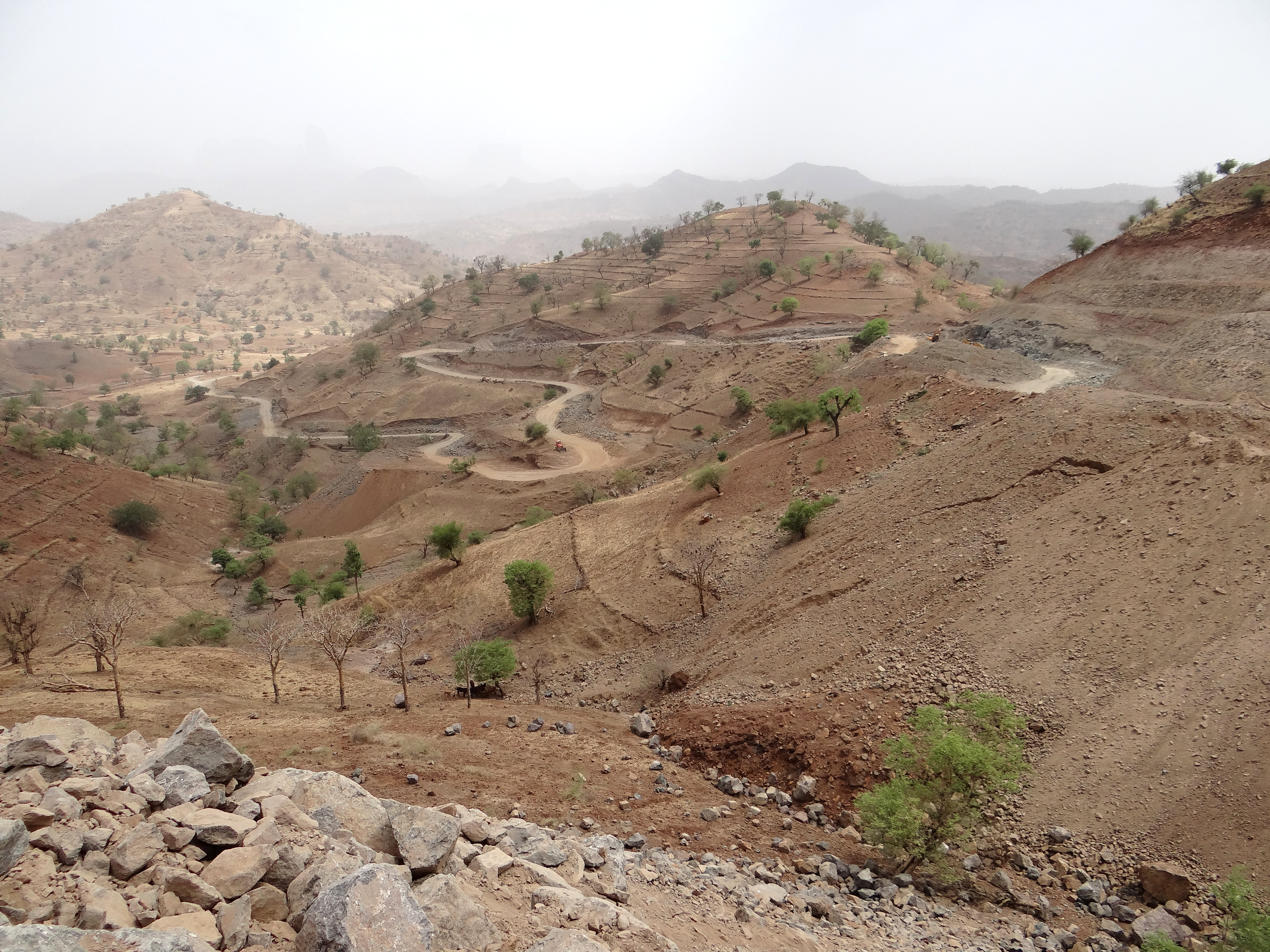

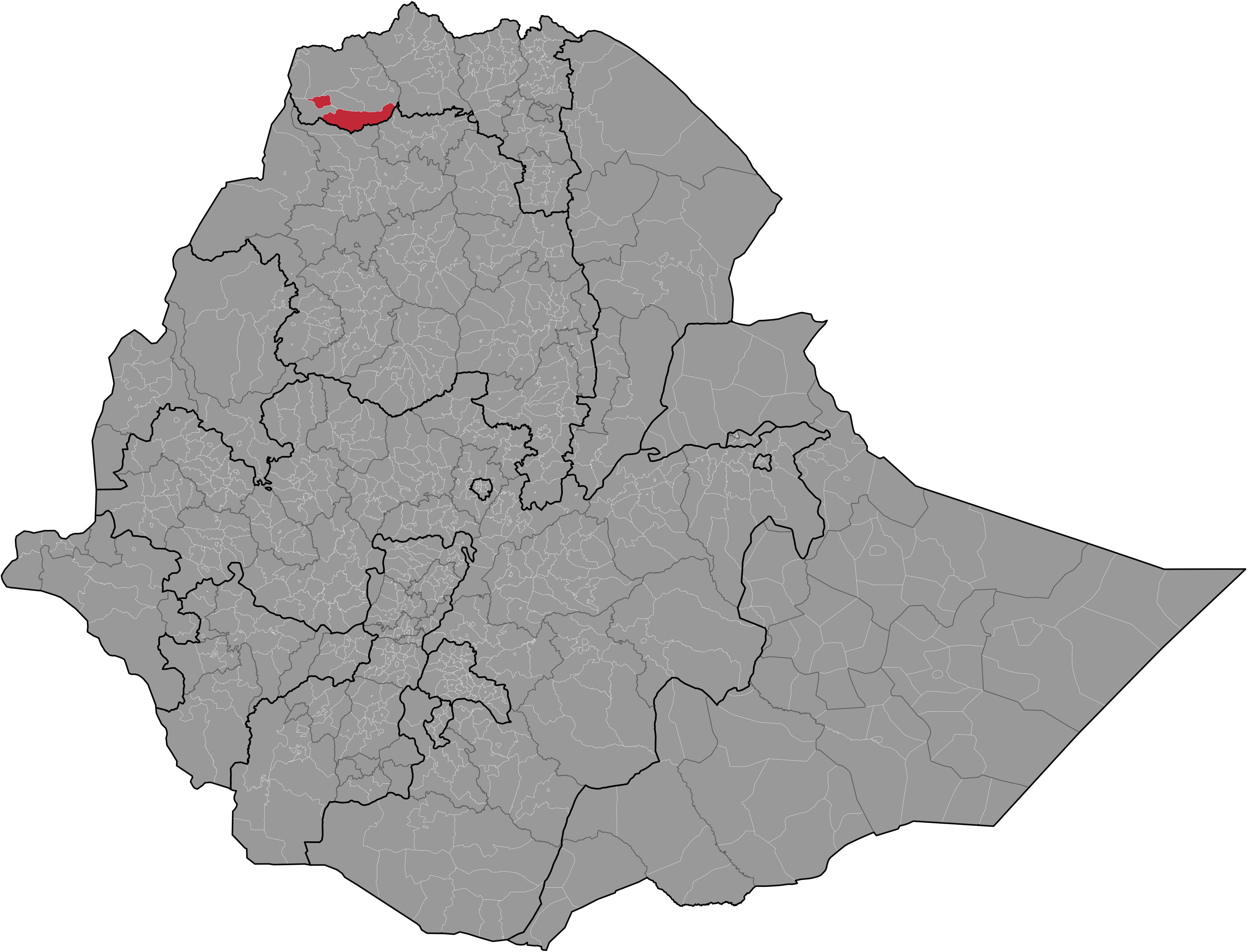
- Country: Ethiopia
- Zone: Western Zone

Area
  - Total: 4,253.48 km^{2} (1,642.28 sq mi)

Population (2007)
  - Total: 103,852

Tsegede/Tegede (Tigrinya: ጸገዴ, Amharic: ጠገዴ) is a woreda in the Western Zone. It is bordered on the south and west by the North Gondar Zone of the Amhara Region, on the northwest by Kafta Humera, and on the north by Welkait. The administrative center of this woreda is Ketema Nigus. Other towns within include Dansha and Idaga Hamus.

== Demographics ==
Based on the 2007 Census conducted by the Central Statistical Agency of Ethiopia (CSA), this woreda has a total population of 103,852, an increase of 59,846 over the 1994 national census, of whom 52,763 are men and 51,089 women. With an area of 4,253.48 square kilometers Tsegede has a population density of 24.42, which is less than the Zone average of 28.94 persons per square kilometer; 9,178 or 8.84% are urban inhabitants. A total of 23,021 households were counted in this woreda, resulting in an average of 4.51 persons to a household, and 21,785 housing units. The majority of the inhabitants said they practiced Ethiopian Orthodox Christianity, with 96.47% reporting that as their religion, while 3.49% of the population were Muslim.

The 1994 national census reported a total population for this woreda of 59,846, of whom 30,282 were men and 29,564 were women; 187 or 0.31% of its population were urban dwellers. The two largest ethnic groups reported in Tsegede were the Tigrayan (76.08%), and the Amhara (23.77%); all other ethnic groups made up 0.15% of the population. Tigrinya is spoken as a first language by 73.05%, and 26.87% speak Amharic; the remaining 0.08% spoke all other primary languages reported. 96.08% of the population said they were Ethiopian Orthodox Christianity, and 3.78% were Muslim. Concerning education, 2.64% of the population were considered literate, which is less than the Zone average of 9.01%; 3.11% of children aged 7–12 were in primary school, which is less than the Zone average of 11.34%; a negligible number of the children aged 13–14 were in junior secondary school, which is also less than the Zone average of 0.65%; and a negligible number of children aged 15–18 were in senior secondary school, which is less than the Zone average of 0.51%. Concerning sanitary conditions, none of the urban houses and about 11% of all houses had access to safe drinking water at the time of the census; none of the urban and about 4% of all houses had toilet facilities.

Tsegede was selected by the Ministry of Agriculture and Rural Development in 2003 as an area for voluntary resettlement for farmers from overpopulated areas. Along with Kafta Humera woreda, the other woreda selected in Tigray that year, this woreda became the home for a total of 7,334 heads of households and 618 total family members. The following year, along with Asgede Tsimbla, this woreda became the home of a total of 24,000 heads of household and a total of 96,000 family members. In 2006, Tsegede was once more selected for this resettlement program, along with Dangila, Lay Armachiho and Qwara in the Amhara Region, becoming the new homes for 8,671 families. This was reportedly accompanied with almost 68 million Birr in infrastructure development.

== Agriculture ==
A sample enumeration performed by the CSA in 2001 interviewed 15,632 farmers in this woreda, who held an average of 1.23 hectares of land. Of the 19,232 hectares of private land surveyed, 88.64% was under cultivation, 2.41% pasture, 7% fallow, 14 hectares in woodland, and 1.87% was devoted to other uses. For the land under cultivation in this woreda, 67% was planted in cereals, 2.74% in pulses, 18.35% in oilseeds, 0.14% in vegetables, and none in root crops. The total area planted in fruit trees is missing, while 25 hectares were planted in gesho. 87.57% of the farmers both raised crops and livestock, while 6.17% only grew crops and 6.26% only raised livestock. Land tenure in this woreda is distributed amongst 86.48% owning their land, 12.6% renting, and 0.92% holding their land under other forms of tenure.

== 2020 woreda reorganisation ==
In 2020 woreda Tsegede became inoperative and its territory belongs to the following new woredas:

- Tsegede (new, smaller, woreda)
- Dansha woreda
