= State of Emergency Inquiry Board (Tigray) =

The State of Emergency Inquiry Board for the Tigray Region is an Ethiopian governmental body created to monitor, investigate and prevent human rights violations during the state of emergency of the Tigray War that started in late November 2020.

== Creation ==
The State of Emergency Inquiry Board was established under Article 93/6 of the 1995 Constitution of Ethiopia by the Ethiopian House of Peoples' Representatives (HoPR) in November 2020 in the context of the state of emergency declared at the beginning of the Tigray War.

== Statutory role ==
Under Article 93/6, the Inquiry Board is obliged to (a) publish the names of anyone arrested under the state of emergency and the reasons for the arrest within a month; (b) investigate and prevent "inhumane" measures; (c) recommend corrective measures to the prime minister or cabinet; (d) "ensure prosecution" of people suspected of inhumane acts; (e) present its views to HoPR on any request to extend the state of emergency. On 22 January 2021, the NGO Ethiopian Human Rights Council (EHRCO) described the Inquiry Board's role as including human rights investigations during and after the war.

== Members ==
The Inquiry Board is chaired by Lemma Tesemma. The other six members are Jembernesh Kinfe, Hawa Ali, Alebachew Lakew, Zerihun Petros, Askale Tilahun and Wendimu Gizaw. In November 2020, Lemma invited complaints about the implementation of the state of emergency to contact the Inquiry Board by telephone, postal mail, email, online social networks or in person at the Parliament.

== Actions ==
In early December 2020, after onsite visits, the Inquiry Board stated that crimes by the Tigray People's Liberation Front (TPLF) against civilians and in the 4 November Northern Command attacks constituted a crime against humanity and that the TPLF would be "accountable" to the International Criminal Court (ICC). According to Ethiopian News Agency, the chairperson Lemma called for "hunting down" of suspects.

On 12 December, the Inquiry Board stated that refugees returning from Sudan accused TPLF forces of bribing Sudanese security forces to assault civilians. The Board described the events as war crimes for which the suspects would be accountable to the ICC. In relation to the Humera massacre, the Board reported on 20 civilians deliberately killed in the intensive care unit in the Humera Hospital.
