= Tigray war =

Armed conflict in Ethiopia (2020–2022)

- Part of the Ethiopian civil conflict (2018–present)
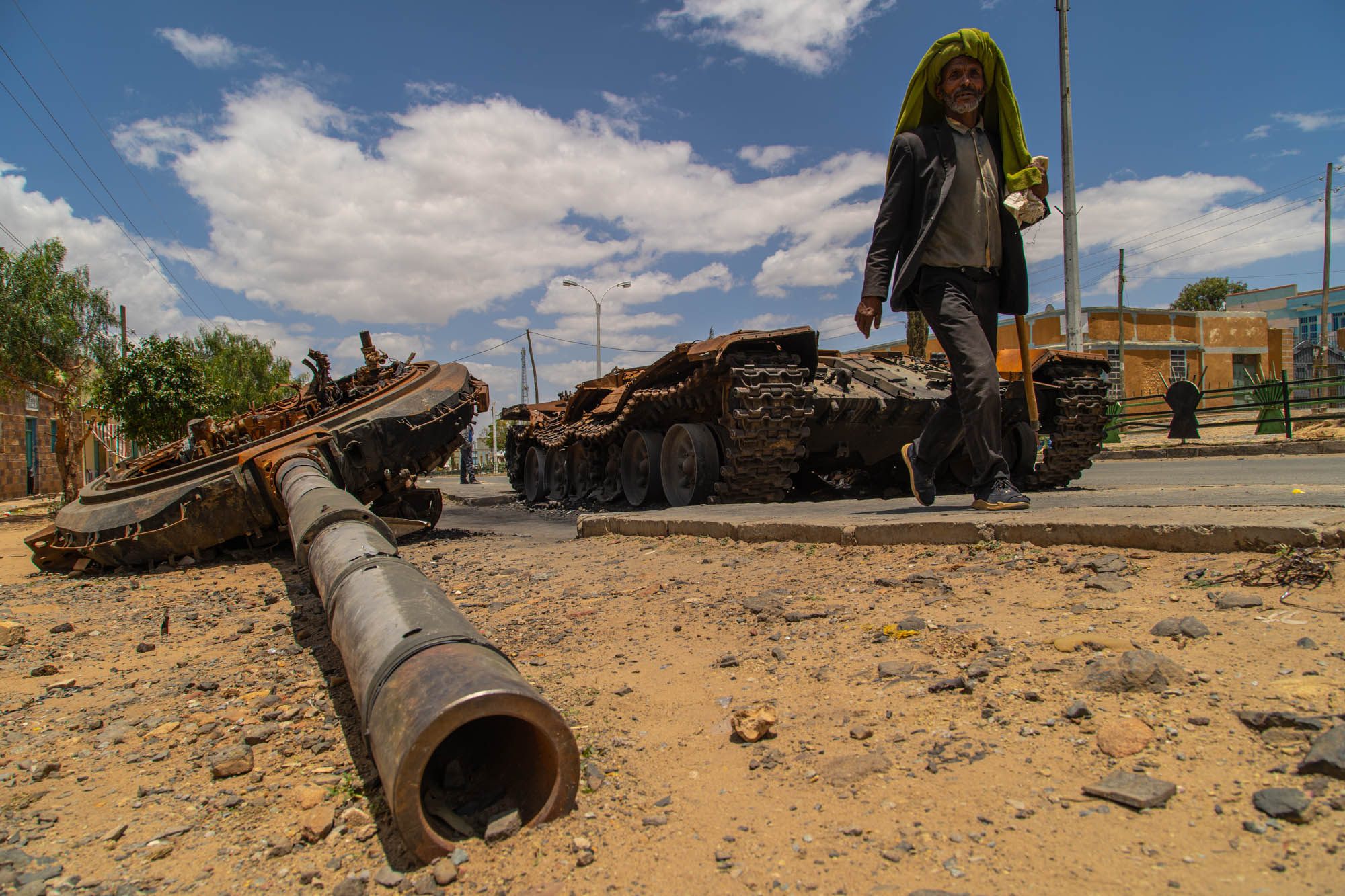
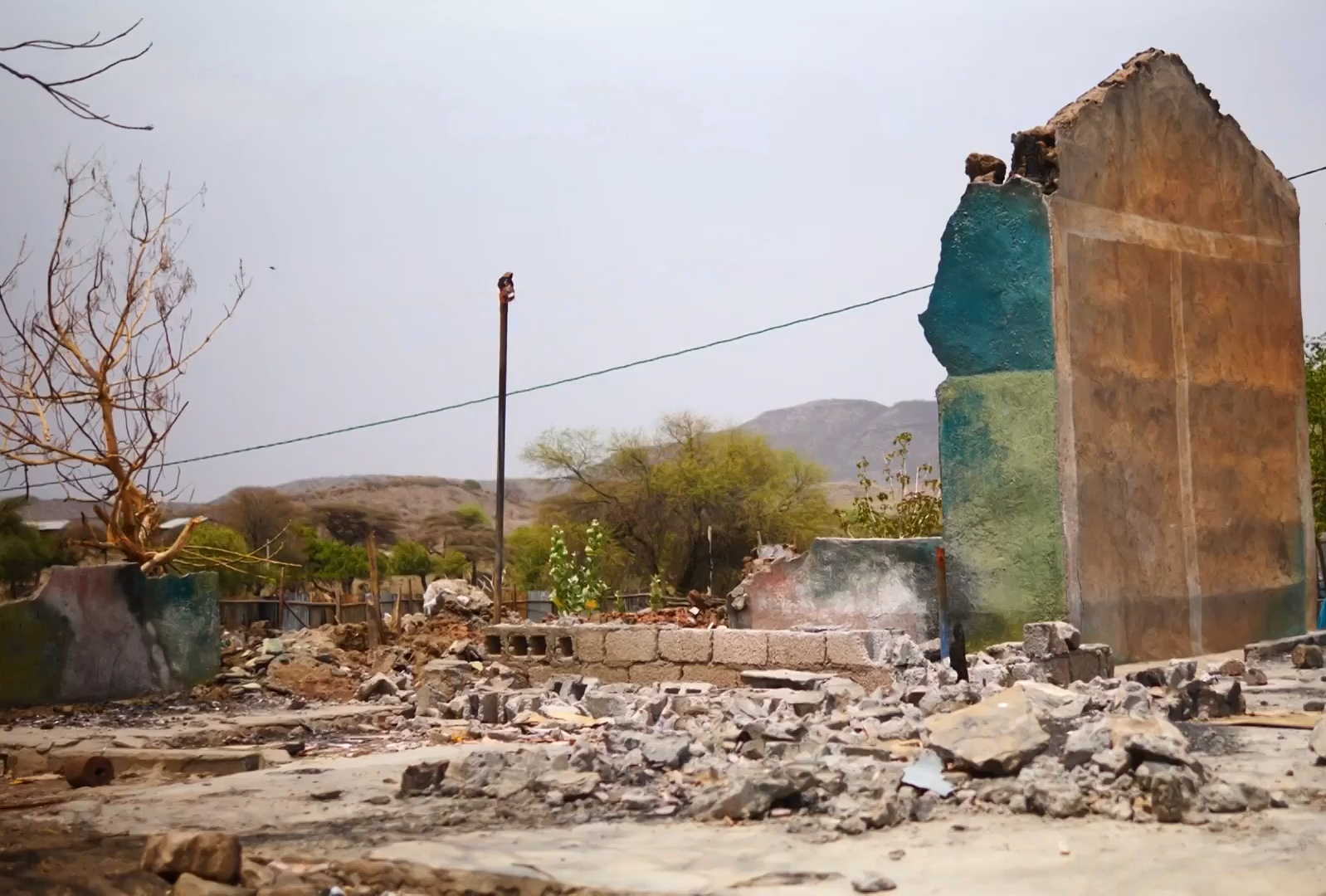
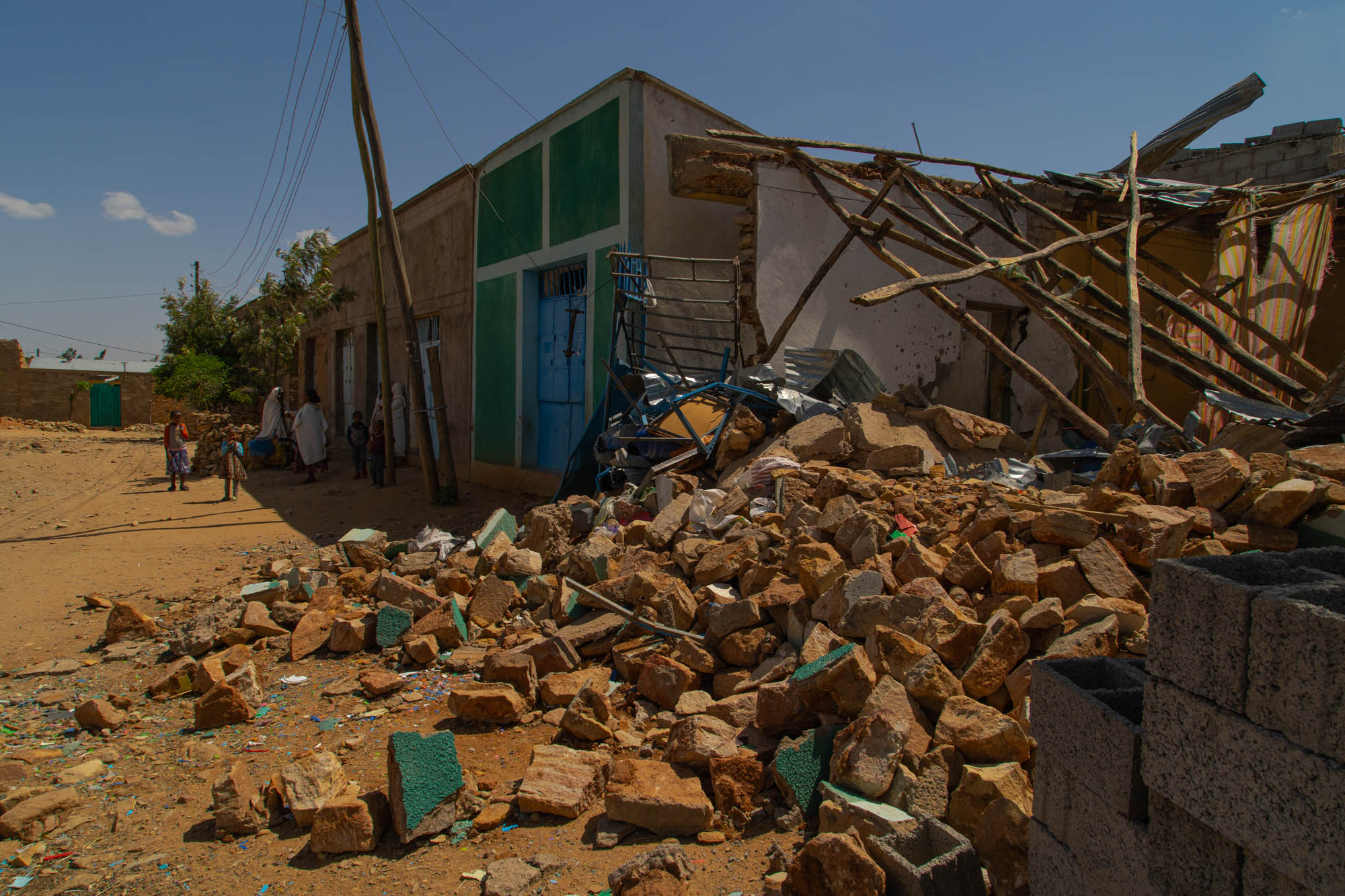
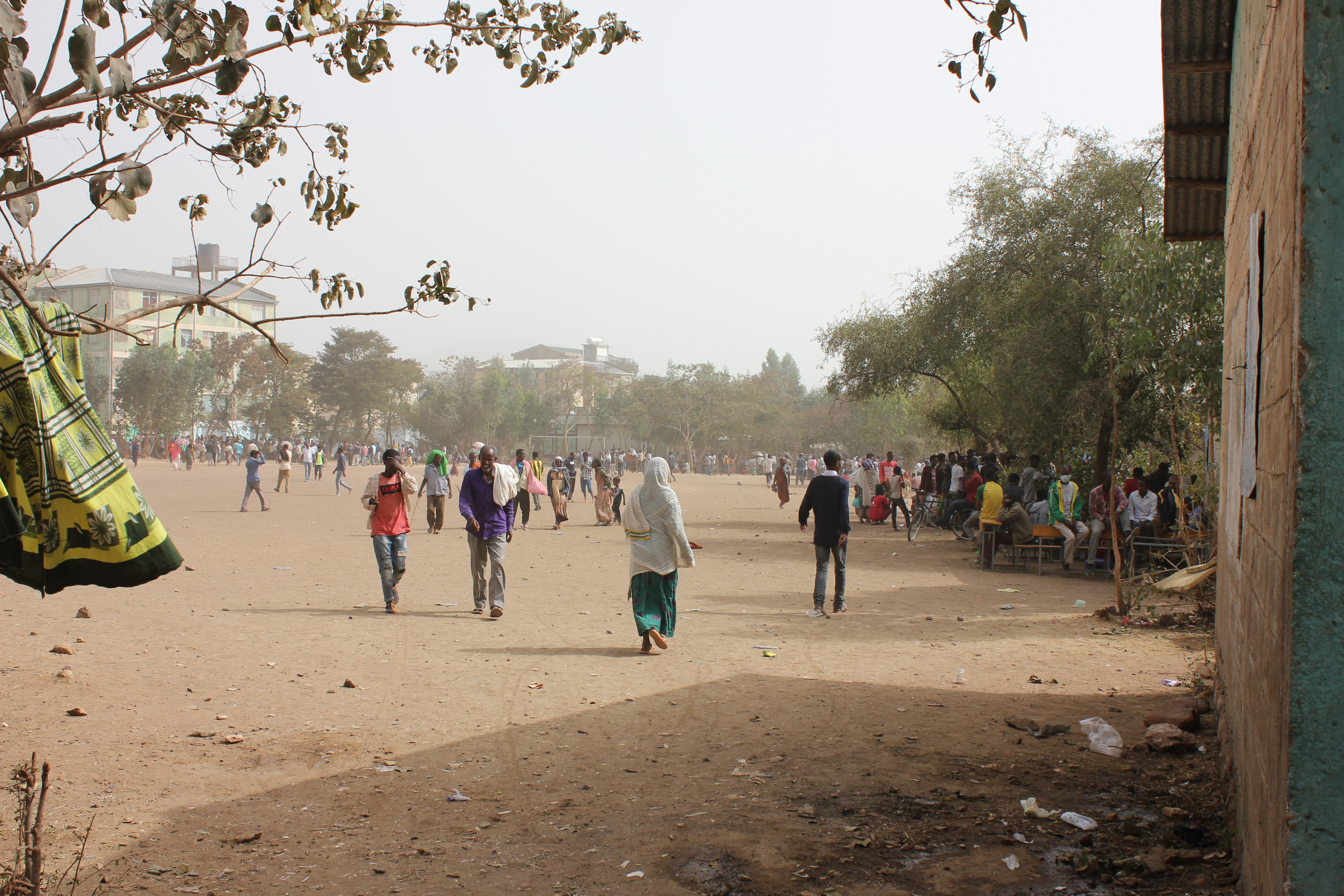
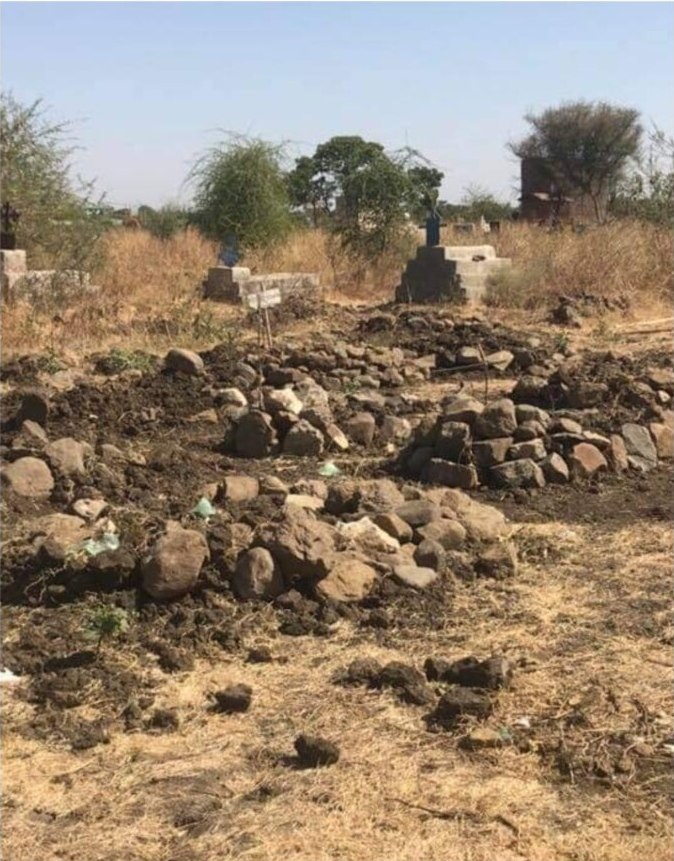
- Clockwise from top: A man passing by a destroyed T-72B tank in Idaga Hamus; destroyed building in Hawzen; cemetery for victims of the Mai Kadra massacre; an IDP camp in Shire; a house destroyed during a battle to control Hawzen
Date	3 November 2020 (Note: Some articles state that the war began on 4 November; however, the earliest instances of fighting are reported to have taken place during the very late hours of 3 November, EAT (UTC+03:00).) – 3 November 2022 (2 years)
Location	Tigray, Amhara, and Afar Regions of Ethiopia; Eritrea; Eritrea–Ethiopia border
Result	Negotiated cessation of hostilities in November 2022; renewed fighting in 2026; TPLF fails to overthrow the federal government; Cessation of hostilities agreed upon by the Ethiopian federal government and TPLF; TPLF agrees to disarm (2 November 2022); Implementation agreement signed by both parties (12 November 2022); Ethiopian federal authority in the Tigray Region reestablished; Interim Regional Administration of Tigray established on 23 March 2023; Western Tigray remained under de facto Amhara administration as of September 2023, with its status unresolved; Tigray political crisis; Fighting resumes with clashes in January–February 2026 and the 2026 Ethiopian offensive

Belligerents
Ethiopia; Transitional Government of Tigray (2020–2021) Eritrea	UFEFCF; TPLF; OLA (2021–2022); Other major rebel factions

Commanders and leaders
(Ethiopia) Abiy Ahmed; (Ethiopia) Sahle-Work Zewde; (Ethiopia) Birhanu Jula; (Ethiopia) Abebaw Tadesse; (Ethiopia) Kenea Yadeta; (Ethiopia) Abraham Belay; (Ethiopia) Agegnehu Teshager; (Eritrea) Isaias Afwerki; (Eritrea) Filipos Woldeyohannes	Debretsion Gebremichael; Fetlework Gebregziabher; Tsadkan Gebretensae; Tadesse Werede; Getachew Reda; Seyoum Mesfin †; Abay Tsehaye †; Jaal Marroo

Units involved
ENDF; Ethiopian Army; ETAF; Amhara Special Forces; Fano; Afar Special Forces; EDF; Eritrean Army; ERAF	Tigray Defense Forces; Oromo Liberation Army (2021–22)

Strength
c. 500,000 (Oct 2022); Amhara Special Forces: 60,000 troops	250,000 (Oct 2022)

Casualties and losses
3,073 killed, 4,473 injured, 600 captured (late 2021 rebel claim); 2 MiG-23 lost; 2 Mi-35 lost; 1 C-130 lost; Unknown	50,000 killed, 245,300 injured, 20,000 captured (early 2021 Ethiopian military claim)
- Exact casualty figures are disputed: 3 UN guards and 23 aid workers killed; 875,879+ refugees (20,000 missing); 2,750,000 internally displaced; 13,000,000 in need of food aid; Total deaths: 100,000+ deaths (per UCDP); 102,000 deaths (per University of London); 162,000–378,000 deaths (per Ghent University); 600,000 deaths (per Olusegun Obasanjo); Up to 800,000 deaths (per University of Manchester)

The Tigray war (Note: Tigrinya: ኲናት ትግራይ, romanized: quinat Tĭgray; Amharic: ትግራይ ጦርነት, romanized: Tigrāy t'orinet; Afar: Tigray qeebi.) (Note: Also referred to in certain academic and policy sources as the northern Ethiopia conflict.) was an armed conflict that lasted from 3 November 2020 to 3 November 2022. It was a civil war primarily fought in the Tigray Region of Ethiopia between forces allied with the Ethiopian federal government and Eritrea on one side, and the Tigray People's Liberation Front (TPLF) on the other.

After years of increased tensions and hostilities between the TPLF and the governments of Ethiopia and Eritrea, fighting began when TPLF forces attacked the Northern Command headquarters of the Ethiopian National Defense Force (ENDF), alongside a number of other bases in Tigray. The ENDF counterattacked from the south – while Eritrean Defence Forces (EDF) began launching attacks from the north – which Prime Minister Abiy Ahmed described as a "law enforcement operation". Federal allied forces captured Mekelle, the capital of the Tigray Region, on 28 November, after which Abiy declared the operation "over." However, the TPLF stated soon afterwards that it would continue fighting until the "invaders" were out, and on 28 June 2021, the Tigray Defense Forces (TDF) retook Mekelle; by July the same year, they had also advanced into the Amhara and Afar regions. In early November 2021, the TDF, together with the Oromo Liberation Army (OLA), took control of several towns on the highway south from Tigray Region towards Addis Ababa, and the TPLF stated that it considered "marching on [the capital]." Together with seven smaller rebel groups, the TPLF and OLA declared a coalition aiming to "dismantle Abiy's government by force or by negotiations, and then form a transitional authority."

After a successful government counter-offensive in response, and then a series of negotiations with the TPLF, Ethiopia declared an indefinite humanitarian truce on 24 March 2022, in order to allow the delivery of humanitarian aid into Tigray. However, fighting dramatically re-escalated in late August 2022, after peace talks broke down. Rapid mobilization of troops soon followed, with Ethiopia, Eritrea and Tigray reportedly organizing hundreds of thousands of troops against each other by October the same year. After a number of peace and mediation proposals in the intervening years, Ethiopia and the Tigrayan rebel forces agreed to a cessation of hostilities on 2 November, which went into effect the day after; Eritrea was not a party to the agreement, however, and it largely continued to occupy parts of Tigray as of 2024.

All sides, particularly the ENDF, EDF, Amhara forces and TDF, committed war crimes during the conflict. Mass extrajudicial killings of civilians took place throughout, including in Axum, Bora, Chenna, Kobo, the Hitsats refugee camp, Humera, Mai Kadra, the Mahbere Dego, and Zalambessa. Additionally, the ENDF and EDF were accused of genocide. Between 100,000 and 600,000 people were killed, and war rape became a "daily" occurrence, with girls as young as 8 and women as old as 72 being raped, often in front of their families. A major humanitarian crisis developed as a result of the war, which led to a widespread famine. It also inflicted immense economic damage on the region, with the cost of rebuilding alone estimated to be roughly $20 billion.

Large-scale fighting in the area resumed in the 2026 Ethiopian offensive, as TPLF forces declared a defensive war against Ethiopia. Tigrayan forces and Ethiopian federal forces clashed while Ethiopia accused Eritrea of supporting rebel groups. The renewed fighting occurred amid deteriorating relations between Ethiopia and Eritrea and unresolved regional tensions involving Sudan and Egypt.

== Background ==
=== Historical and political context ===
Following the end of the Ethiopian Civil War in 1991, Ethiopia became a dominant-party state under the rule of the Ethiopian People's Revolutionary Democratic Front (EPRDF), a coalition of four ethnically based parties. The founding and most influential member was the Tigray People's Liberation Front (TPLF), led by Meles Zenawi, who was the prime minister of Ethiopia until his death in 2012. He was succeeded by Deputy Prime Minister Hailemariam Desalegn, the chairman of the Southern Ethiopian People's Democratic Movement (SEPDM), a coalition member. On 15 February 2018, Hailemariam announced his resignation as both prime minister and chairman of the EPRDF, owing to a growing discontent within the public, fueled by a reaction to 27 years of repressive governance.

On 28 March 2018, in a closed-door election to chair the EPRDF, executive committee members elected the Oromo Peoples' Democratic Organisation (OPDO) chairman Abiy Ahmed. On 2 April 2018, Ethiopian parliament elected Abiy as prime minister. One of Abiy's first actions after his election was to initiate a warming of relations with Eritrea, a long-time rival of the TPLF, to end a 20-year long border conflict. While this decision was considered a cause of celebration at the time, many within the Tigray Region were heavily critical of this, seeing it as a betrayal of those who died in the 1998–2000 war. The TPLF condemned the peace initiatives, saying they were hastily made, had "fundamental flaws", and also claimed it was decided on without consulting long-time TPLF members.

On 1 December 2019, Abiy merged the ethnic and region-based parties of the EPRDF (which had governed Ethiopia for 28 years) and several opposition parties into his new Prosperity Party. The TPLF, which had long dominated Ethiopian politics, refused to join this new party. After losing the election and being ousted from the federal government, TPLF officials relocated to the Tigray Region, continuing to administer control there while frequently clashing with the federal government. In one instance, the Tigray regional government was reported to have defied the federal government and refused to allow Ethiopian Federal Police to arrest Getachew Assefa, the former chief of the National Intelligence and Security Service (NISS) of Ethiopia and executive member of the TPLF.

The Ethiopian government and its supporters accused the TPLF of trying to re-establish their rule over the country through violence and force. In turn, the TPLF accused the federal government of accumulating too much power for itself, and that it was engaging in ethnic discrimination of Tigrayans.

==== Lead-up to the war ====
Throughout 2020, tensions between the federal government and the TPLF escalated in the months leading up to November. In March, the National Election Board of Ethiopia delayed the general elections – originally scheduled for 29 August 2020 – to a then-undetermined date, due to the COVID-19 pandemic. The terms of federal and regional lawmakers, as well as the executive branch, were then extended by federal parliament beyond the October 2020 constitutional mandates.

The TPLF, led by its chairman Debretsion Gebremichael, rejected these measures, arguing that they were unconstitutional, and held its own regional election on 9 September, in defiance of the federal government. Several journalists were barred by the Ethiopian government from travelling to cover Tigray's regional election. Ethiopia considered the Tigray election to be illegal, and responded by slashing federal funding to the region, a decision the TPLF described as "tantamount to declaration of war."

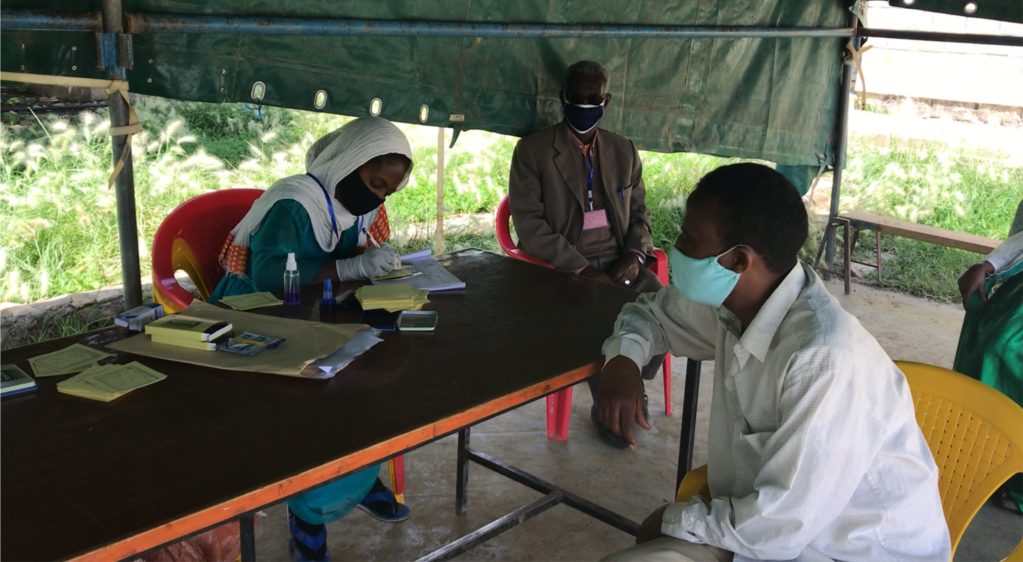
People in Tigray registering to vote in the 2020 regional election during the COVID-19 pandemic (August 2020)

In late September 2020, the TPLF stated that the constitutional term limit of the House of Federation, the House of Peoples' Representatives, the prime minister, and the Council of Ministers was 5 October 2020 and that for this reason, it would consider "the incumbent" constitutionally illegitimate after 5 October; they proposed replacing the government with a technocratic caretaker government, as detailed in a plan posted on Facebook by the Coalition of Ethiopian Federalist Forces. Ethiopian elite units were transported to Gherghera base near Asmara, as part of an alleged pact between Prime Minister Abiy and Eritrean President Isaias Afwerki to "strike out of existence the TPLF," according to former Eritrean Minister of Defence Mesfin Hagos.

In late October 2020, the Ethiopian Reconciliation Commission stated that it was trying to mediate between the federal government and the TPLF, as well as the other regional governments, but that the pre-conditions set by all sides were blocking progress. As tension continued to grow, a brigadier general appointed by Abiy was prevented by the Tigray government from taking up his military post. The same day before the Tigray forces launched the Northern Command attacks, the federal parliament of Ethiopia had suggested designating the TPLF as a terrorist organization.

=== Constitutional context ===
The 1995 Constitution of Ethiopia states in Article 39.1, "Every Nation, Nationality, and People in Ethiopia has an unconditional right to self-determination, including the right to secession." Article 62.9 grants the House of Federation the right to "order Federal intervention if any State [government], in violation of [the] Constitution, endangers the constitutional order."

== Course of the war ==
=== Initial fighting (3–28 November 2020) ===
Northern Command attacks

A map showing the Ethiopian-allied forces' Tigray offensive, 4–28 November 2020

Just before midnight on 3 November 2020, Tigray Special Forces and allied local militia attacked the Ethiopian National Defense Force (ENDF) Northern Command headquarters in Mekelle, the Fifth Battalion barracks in Dansha, and other Northern Command bases. Several people were killed and the TPLF claimed the attack was carried out in self-defense or preemptive self-defense.

In retaliation, an Ethiopian offensive was launched on 4 November, which was accompanied by the declaration of a state of emergency, the creation of the State of Emergency Inquiry Board and a shutdown of government services in the Tigray Region. During the subsequent days, skirmishes continued and the Ethiopian federal parliament declared the creation of an interim government for Tigray. Ethiopian offensives in the north were accompanied with airstrikes and several towns and cities were retaken.

Early massacres

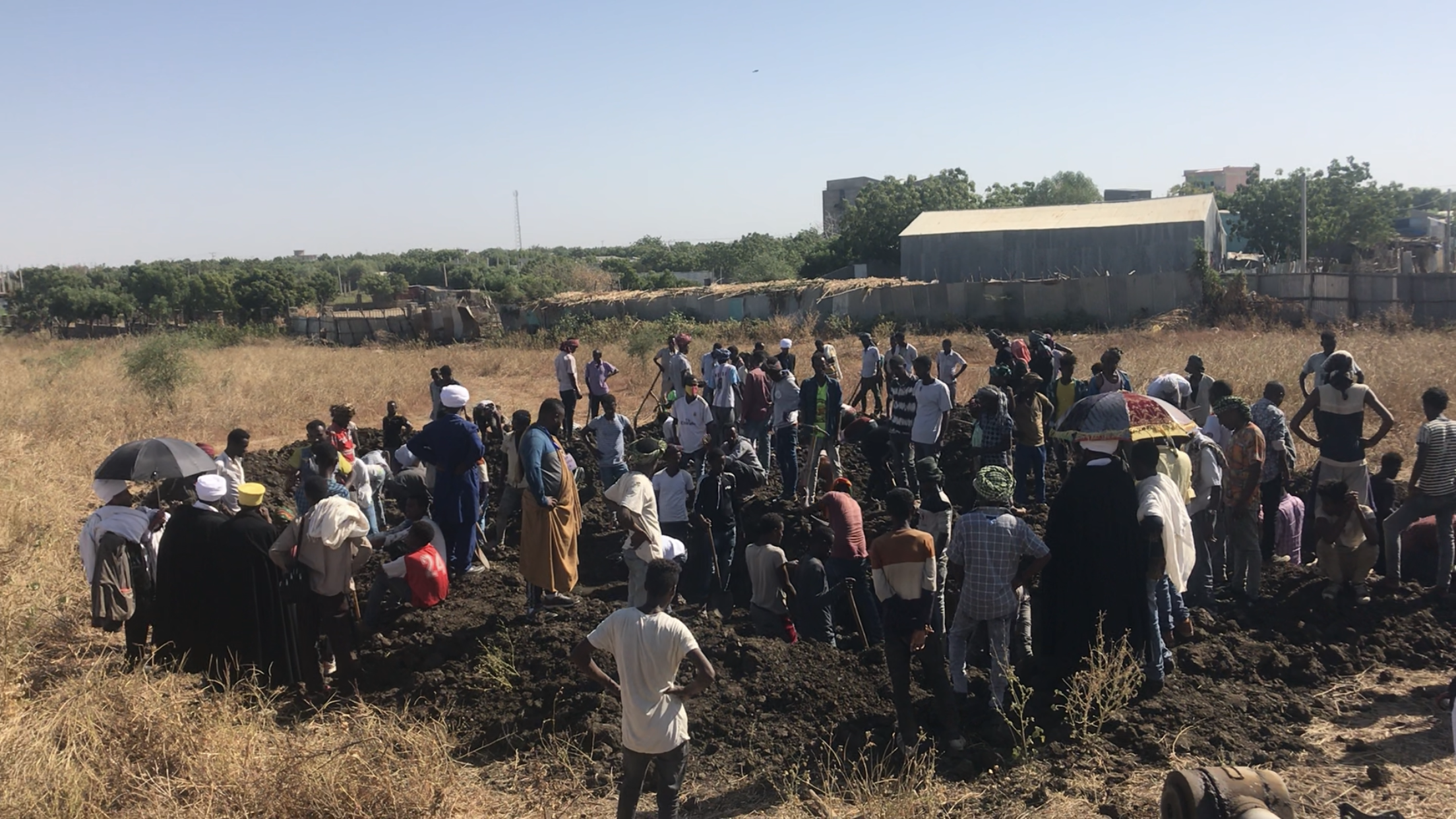
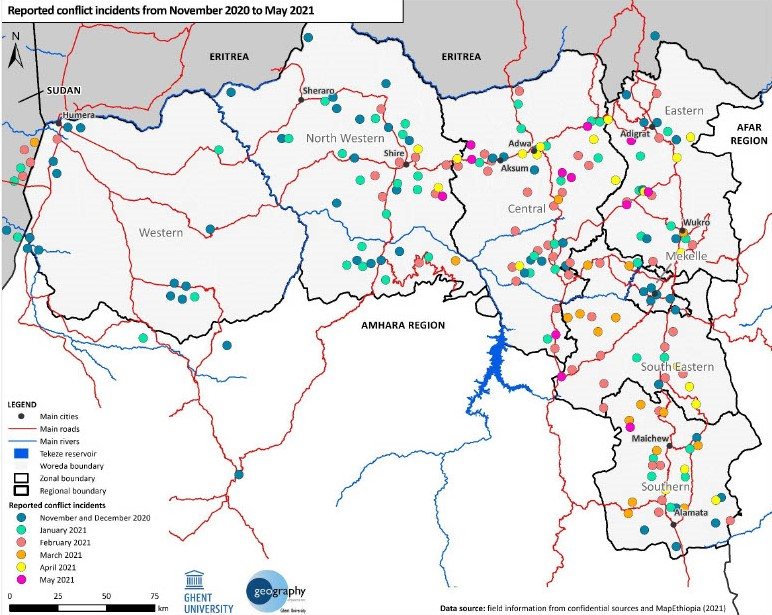
Funeral service for the victims of the Mai Kadra massacre (1); Reported conflict incidents in the first 7 months of the war, including battles, ambushes, airstrikes, drone attacks and shelling. (2)

On the night of 9 to 10 November 2020, 600 civilians, mostly Amharas and Welkait, were killed in a massacre in the town of Mai Kadra with machetes and knives used by local militias and police that were loyal to the TPLF, according to preliminary investigations by Amnesty International and the Ethiopian Human Rights Commission; other refugees, interviewed by the Financial Times and Reuters, said it was the Amhara militia who were the perpetrators and Tigrayans who were the victims. Two days later, refugees interviewed by the Daily Telegraph, The Guardian and The New York Times stated that Amhara militias, including Fano, and the ENDF carried out beatings and massacres of 92 Tigrayans in Humera. Humera was shelled from the direction of the Eritrean–Ethiopian border for two days around 9–11 November. The ENDF gained control of the town one day later. Within the same month, Amhara Region forces took over and occupied Western Tigray.

Offensives of joint ENDF-Amhara Region-Eritrean forces into Tigray were facilitated by the intervention of "Pterosaurus" drones, launched by the United Arab Emirates from its base in Assab, Eritrea. The Chinese-made, armed drones bombed Tigrayan artillery and weapons depots. (Note: A few EEPA articles begin with the following injunction: "Unconfirmed report".) In the late hours of 13 November 2020, Tigray forces fired a rocket towards the airports of Bahir Dar and Gondar in the Amhara Region. On 14 November, Tigray forces launched rockets at the Eritrean capital of Asmara, but the missiles missed. The Tigray government claimed these locations contained military terminals that served as bases to carry out airstrikes.

Mekelle offensive

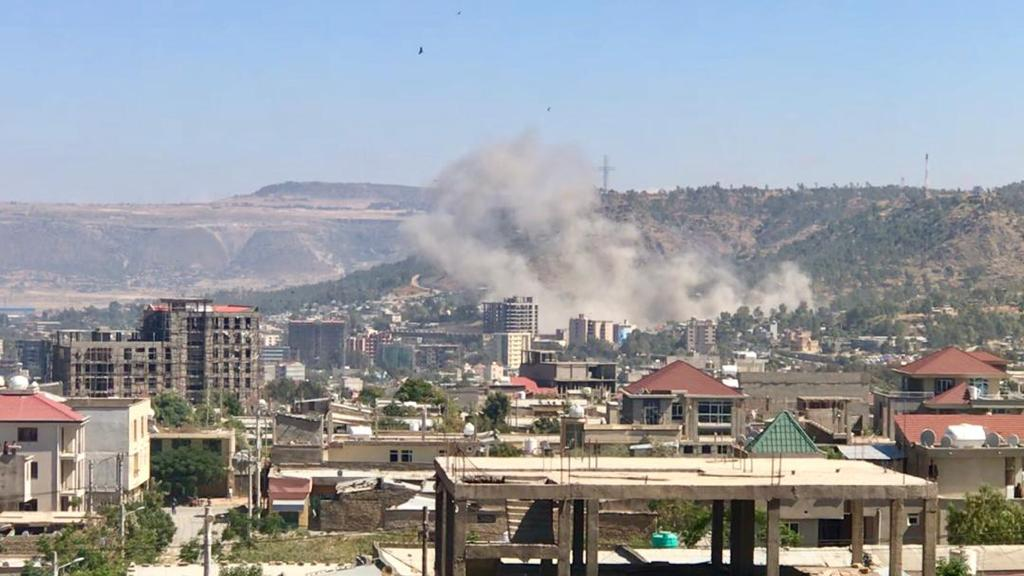
The aftermath of an airstrike on Mekelle

From 17 to 19 November, Ethiopian forces captured the Raya district and the towns of Shire, Alamata, Adwa, and Axum, and began moving towards Adigrat. Fighting between Tigray and Eritrea took place in Adi Quala, Zalambessa, Taruna, Ali Tina, Wadqomdi, and Badme. On 23 November, Ethiopian forces reached the regional capital of Mekelle and encircled it. A military spokesperson for Ethiopia South Command, Colonel Dejene Tsegaye, announced that Mekelle would be shelled, and told Tigray civilians to flee the city because Ethiopian forces would show no mercy.

Though TPLF leaders and special forces had already left the city, Ethiopian forces continued their direct assault on Mekelle on the morning of 28 November, and started heavily shelling the city. By the evening, Prime Minister Abiy declared Ethiopian forces had taken full control of the city. In total, 27 civilians were killed and 100 others were injured. The Tigray government vowed to continue fighting.

=== Tigrayan guerrilla warfare (November 2020 – June 2021) ===
Formation of the Tigray Defense Forces

After Ethiopian federal forces and their allies captured Mekelle and other major cities, forces loyal to the Tigray government began to regroup into mountainous areas of the region and reorganized under the banner of the Tigray Defense Forces (TDF). This retreat was partially caused by the fact that a large portion of the TDF's artillery had been destroyed by air strikes. The TDF also began to dig into their positions in rural Tigray, marking the start of a guerrilla campaign against Ethiopian-allied forces from the mountains.

Eritrean occupation of the northeast

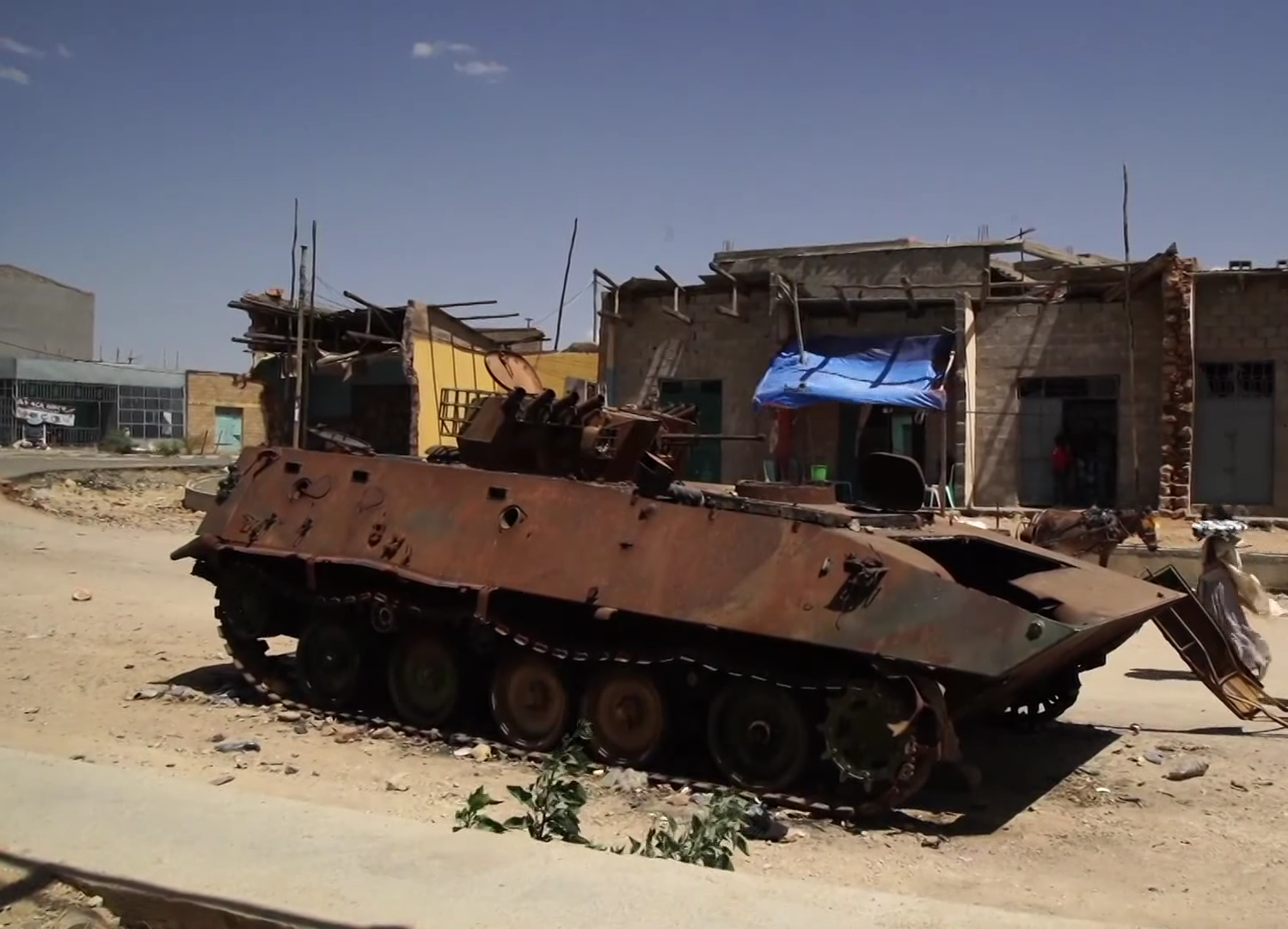
Destroyed Type 89 AFV armored personnel carrier in Axum, Tigray Region; June 2021

On 28 and 29 November, witnesses and survivors, including refugees in Sudan, reported that the Eritrean Defence Forces (EDF) carried out the Axum massacre of about 720 to 800 civilians. The Eritrean government stated that it was angered by Amnesty International's report on the massacre, calling it "transparently unprofessional" and "politically motivated" and accusing Amnesty of fabricating evidence. However, refugees also spoke of the EDF killing 80–150 people in Idaga Hamus on 30 November, as part of a larger series of extrajudicial killings known as the Adigrat massacres.

A witness told Al Jazeera that, on 4 December, Eritrean troops entered her town in southeastern Tigray and attempted to rape her; this statement is corroborated by other survivors and witnesses, who spoke of rampant sexual violence, massacres and destruction of civilian infrastructure committed by the EDF. In February 2021, the UN chief coordinator of humanitarian efforts Mark Lowcock said that up to 40% of Tigray was not controlled by Ethiopian troops. Aside from Tigrayan rebel forces, he said that much of that area was under the control of the EDF, pursuing their own objectives independent of Ethiopian command. By early March, residents said that the number of Eritrean soldiers in Tigray was in the thousands.

Continued insurgency

The Tigray insurgency, 28 November 2020 – 18 June 2021

By mid-December, fighting had reached Hagere Selam, Samre, Dogu'a, Kola Tembien, May Tsemre and localities around Maychew. During this time, a violently enforced curfew was set up by Ethiopian forces along with Eritrean soldiers. According to the Europe External Programme with Africa (EEPA), in Wukro over 200 people were killed and the town was left deserted. The Ethiopian government denied involvement in the killing.

On 9 January 2021, Ethiopian TV reported that 300 refugees in Hitsats camp were executed by the TPLF. According to refugees, pro-TPLF forces used Hitsats as a base for several weeks in November 2020, killing several refugees who wanted to leave the camp to get food and, in one incident, killed nine young Eritrean men in revenge for having lost a battle against the EDF. On 18 February, unidentified militiamen ambushed a passenger bus in Adi Mesino, killing six and injuring 10.

Ultimately, the early gains made by the ENDF and EDF against Tigrayan forces did not lead to a decisive defeat of the re-organized and invigorated TDF. In late January, the TDF had rallied and were intensifying their insurgency against Ethiopian forces despite the initial setbacks and heavy losses. During this time fighting was reported to have taken place around Mekelle, and the ENDF had retreated from rural positions towards the city. Several of these clashes took place in mid-February at Samre, a small town 45 km (28 mi) south-west of Mekelle. Thousands of Ethiopian troops supported by artillery, tanks, and airstrikes fought dug-in forces loyal to the Tigray regional government.

According to a report by Ghent University, massacres of civilians continued into March, including around 250 in Humera over the course of three days by unconfirmed perpetrators, and 13 in Grizana by the EDF. That same month, an undated video surfaced that purported to show Ethiopian troops executing 11 unarmed men before throwing their bodies off a cliff near Mahibere Dego.

TDF regains territory

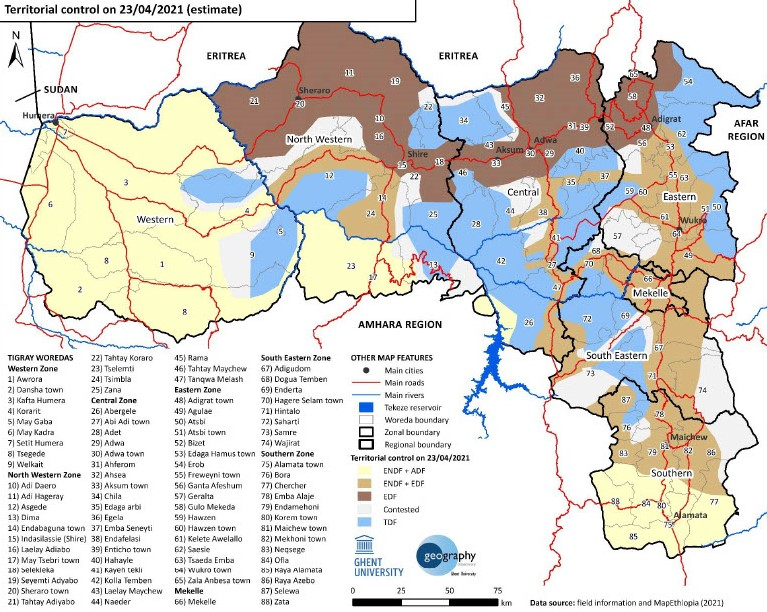
Estimated territorial control on 23 April 2021

Fighting intensified in early April; by this point, the TDF was in control of the rural areas of central and southern Tigray along with parts of eastern and south-eastern Tigray, while the ENDF was in control of the main roads and urban areas. Amhara and Eritrean forces also controlled parts of Tigray in the west and north, respectively. All sides wished to secure a military victory, but they lacked the ability to do so in the near term, and so they began to prepare for a prolonged conflict. The Tigray Defense Forces were engaged in a war of attrition with popular support from the people of Tigray, who were infuriated by war crimes committed by Eritrean and Ethiopian soldiers and worried about a potential decrease in the region's autonomy. This resulted in the TDF growing in strength and the concept of secession from Ethiopia gaining popularity in Tigray, a stance which was considered likely to inflame Amhara-Tigray territorial disputes.

On 6 May, Ethiopia's House of Peoples' Representatives declared the TPLF as a terrorist organization. On 21 May, Ethiopia's military prosecutors convicted 3 soldiers of rape, and pressed charges against more than 50 others suspected of killing or raping civilians in Tigray.

=== Tigrayan counter-offensive (June – November 2021) ===
Retaking of Mekelle

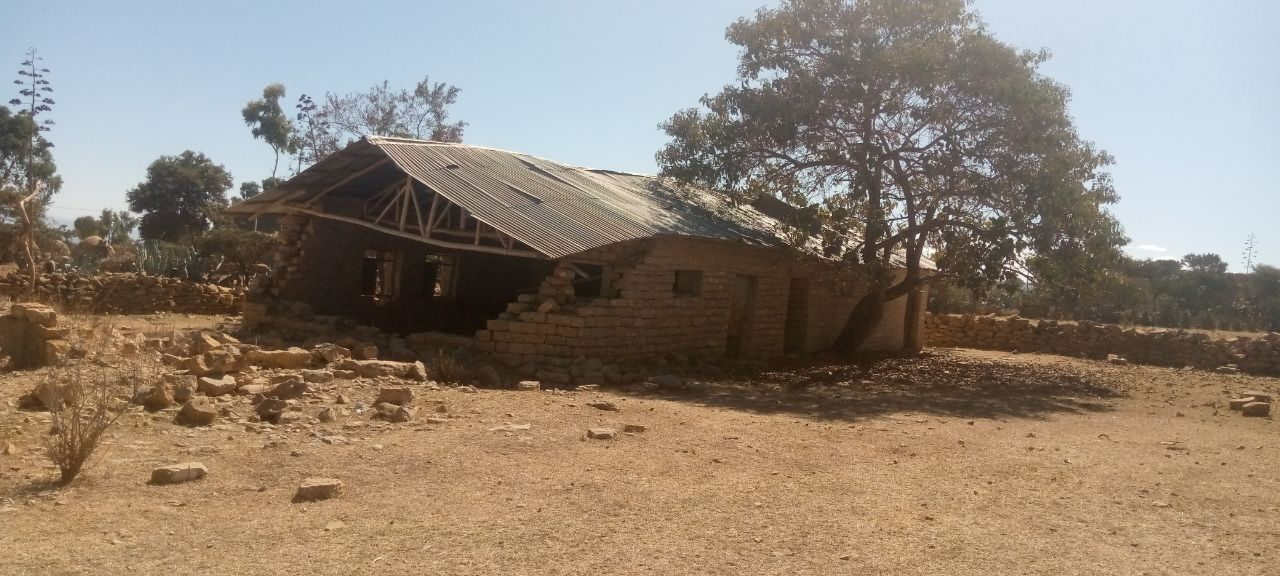
Abandoned school in Addilal, Dogu'a Tembien, partially destroyed by a bombing by the Ethiopian Air Force in June 2021

On 22 June 2021, an Ethiopian military cargo plane was shot down over Samre, marking a turn of the war in the TDF's favor. On 28 June 2021, the Tigray Defense Forces retook the city of Mekelle. People celebrated in the streets of Mekelle as the TDF took the city. Ethiopian soldiers, police and administrators were seen leaving, ahead of the occupation by the TDF. Shortly after hearing news of the TDF advance, the Ethiopian government declared an immediate unilateral ceasefire across the Tigray Region. BBC News reporter Vivienne Nunis characterised the ceasefire as an attempt by Prime Minister Abiy Ahmed to save face, the government having little other option.

On 29 June, Tigrayan forces vowed to continue their offensive and drive into Eritrea or the Amhara Region if necessary, and said that Mekelle was 100% under the control of Tigrayan forces. On 30 June 2021, the TDF had entered the town of Shire, some 140 kilometres (87 mi) northwest of Mekelle, after it had been abandoned by Eritrean troops. The International Crisis Group claimed that the TDF now controlled most of the Tigray region. The Ethiopian government claimed, on 30 June, that it could re-enter Mekelle in less than three weeks if it wanted to. In the same announcement, the Ethiopian government stated that all Eritrean forces had withdrawn from the region, though this was not confirmed by the Eritrean government.

Tigrayan push in Afar and Amhara

A map showing the TDF's Gondar-Bahir Dar offensive, 6 July – 20 August 2021

On 6 July 2021, the Tigrayan government mobilised to retake western Tigray from Amhara forces. A TDF offensive starting on 12 July resulted in Tigrayan forces capturing southern Tigray, including the towns of Alamata and Korem. The TDF subsequently crossed the Tekezé River and advanced westward, capturing the town of Mai Tsebri in the Tselemti district, and prompting Amhara officials to call on its militias to arm themselves and mobilise. Following the TDF's rapid advances, Abiy threatened to resume war with Tigray and crush the rebels, raising fears of genocide. He called on other regions of Ethiopia to mobilise their special forces. The Oromia, Sidama, and SNNPR regions answered the call and mobilised.

From 17 to 19 July, the TDF began launching attacks in the Afar Region to its east, prompting the Benishangul-Gumuz, Gambela, Harari and Somali regions to join the war. Heavy fighting in western Afar displaced over 54,000 people, and resulted in the TDF reportedly capturing three districts in the region.

While the Tigray government claimed it only entered Afar to target federal forces, experts believe their aim was to sever a portion of National Highway A1, a vital trade route for landlocked Ethiopia, linking the capital of Addis Ababa to the Port of Djibouti, from which most of its petroleum products are imported. Following the TDF's counter-attack on two districts of his region, the Amhara regional President, Agegnehu Teshager, called for the total mobilisation of all people of all ages who are armed in the region to fight against the Tigrayans. A similar call was made in Afar. Meanwhile, the city of Weldiya was captured by the TDF on 12 August 2021.

On 4 August 2021, some Agew people declared themselves independent from the Amhara Region and formed the Agew Liberation Front (ALF). The next day, Lalibela was reported to have been seized by Tigrayan forces. On 9 August, UNICEF executive director Henrietta Fore expressed concern about reports that over 200 people, including 100 children, had been killed in attacks on displaced families sheltering at a health facility and a school in the Afar Region. On 11 August, the TDF and the Oromo Liberation Army (OLA) announced an alliance to overthrow Abiy Ahmed's government, saying they were also in talks with other rebel groups to establish a "grand coalition". With the TDF advancing deeper into Amhara, various cities across the region began enforcing curfews.

On 9 September 2021, the Ethiopian government claimed Tigrayan forces had been "routed" and heavily defeated in the Afar Region. TPLF spokesperson Getachew Reda said its forces had seen no fighting in Afar and had redeployed to the adjoining Amhara Region. On 30 September, amid UN concerns about a blockade of aid deliveries to Tigray, the Ethiopian government expelled 7 top UN officials, reportedly because of "meddling" in its internal affairs, giving the officials 72 hours to leave the country.

October 2021 government-allied offensive

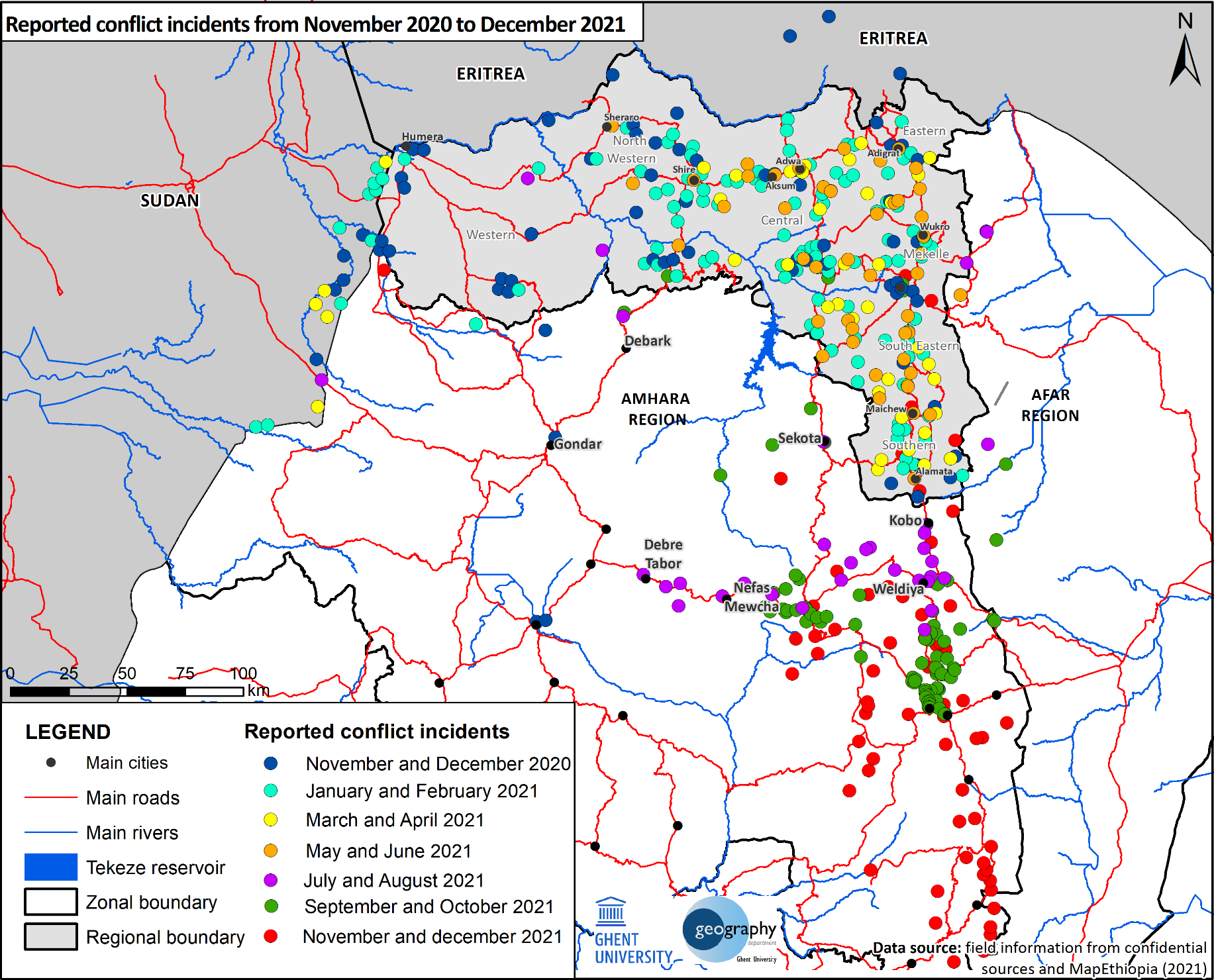
Conflict incidents reported between November 2020 and December 2021

On 8 October 2021, Getachew said that an intensive air campaign by the Ethiopian Air Force began against TDF positions in the North Wollo and North Gondar zones of the Amhara Region, mostly around the towns of Wegeltena, Wurgessa and Haro. He also stated there was a "massive build up of forces on all fronts." The federal government and Amhara regional government did not respond to the claim. On 11 October, Ethiopian-allied forces launched coordinated ground attacks "on all fronts" against the TDF with combined arms including tanks, helicopters, heavy artillery, warplanes, and drones according to the Tigrayan government. General Tsadkan Gebretensae, member of the central command of the TDF said both sides had been preparing for the offensive for months, and predicted that battle would be "decisive".

The new offensive effectively ended the unilateral ceasefire declared by the federal government in June and further deepened fears of the developing famine in Tigray, with a federal government blockade still preventing most aid from arriving. Meanwhile, the continued war prompted regional leaders, including Kenyan President Kenyatta, to voice their concerns and urge peace, while US Secretary of State Blinken met with the AU envoy to Ethiopia, former Nigerian President Olusegun Obasanjo, to discuss the crisis.

On 13 October, Getachew claimed fighting continued intensifying with "staggering" casualties. He also claimed clashes were taking place near Weldiya and that fighting had resumed in Afar, within the Awra and Chifra districts near the Amhara border. A humanitarian worker citing witnesses said the EDF were fighting the TDF in Berhale, a town in Afar 71 kilometres (44 mi) northeast of Mekelle.

==== TDF-OLA joint offensive (October – December 2021) ====
Fall of Dessie and Kombolcha

A map showing the TDF–OLA joint offensive, 16 October – 1 December 2021

On 30 October, it was reported that Dessie had fallen to the TDF. However, control over the city was not immediately certain, with the federal government denying its capture and reports of fierce fighting coming from the town. On 31 October, the TDF claimed to have captured Kombolcha, a town 21 km (13 mi) east of Dessie, and the Ethiopian government accused the TDF of massacring over 100 youths in the town. On the same day, the Amhara regional government declared a state of emergency, which included a region-wide curfew.

South of Kombolcha, the OLA claimed to have seized control over Kemise on the A2 Highway which links Mekelle to the Ethiopian capital of Addis Ababa, and later declared they were considering an offensive towards the capital. The TDF claimed they also linked up with the OLA. Meanwhile, it was reported that a new roundup of ethnic Tigrayans had occurred in Addis Ababa.

State of emergency and rebel coalition

On 2 November 2021, as the counter-offensive came deeper into federal-controlled territory, the Ethiopian government declared a six-month state of emergency, which envisages the possibility to arrest and detain critics of the government without a court warrant, impose curfews, institute censorship, restrict freedom of movement as well as to call any adult person to fight in the war, for fear of serving from three to ten years in prison. Authorities in Addis Ababa also told residents to register their weapons in order to fend off the anticipated offensive. Four other regional governments also made a call to arms. On 5 November, the TPLF, OLA and other rebel groups declared the creation of a nine-group coalition, called the United Front of Ethiopian Federalist and Confederalist Forces.

On 22 November, Prime Minister Abiy stated that he will be leading the fight against the rebels from the battlefront after the TDF claimed to have captured Shewa Robit, saying; "We are now in the final stages of saving Ethiopia." Many countries also urged citizens to leave the country.

=== Government-allied counter-offensive (November 2021 – March 2022) ===
A map showing the ENDF's National Unity offensive, 26 November – 23 December 2021

From 26 November to 6 December 2021, Ethiopian allied forces recaptured several towns in the Amhara and Afar regions including Lalibela and Shewa Robit, according to the Ethiopian government. On 6 December, government forces claimed to have recaptured the strategic cities of Dessie and Kombolcha. This was later confirmed by TPLF spokesman Getachew Reda; however, he claimed this was a strategic withdrawal, which was "part of their plan". On 12 December, Reuters reported that forces loyal to the TPLF had recaptured the town of Lalibela less than two weeks after government forces and their allies had recaptured control of the town for themselves. Nevertheless, by the end of the month, the federal government had successfully repelled the incursion towards Addis Ababa, and Tigrayan forces were pushed back to Tigray.

Fighting slows down

On 20 December 2021, the TPLF announced they had withdrawn their troops from Amhara and Afar, saying they were hoping to create, as stated by TPLF chairman Debretsion Gebremichael, "a decisive opening for peace". Debretsion also requested the establishment of a no-fly zone over Tigray, as well as a weapons embargo against Ethiopia and Eritrea. Following these developments, the ENDF stated that it would not advance any deeper into the Tigray region. However, in January 2022, the Ethiopian Air Force began launching a bombing campaign in the Tigray Region, killing 108 people, including at least 56 from an airstrike targeting an IDP camp in Dedebit.

On 7 January – the same day as the Dedebit airstrike – Ethiopia released a number of opposition leaders from prison, including some from the TPLF, and said they desired to have a dialogue with the Tigrayan leadership. On 26 January, the Ethiopian council of ministers also proposed to end the state of emergency.

=== Ceasefire period (March – August 2022) ===
On 24 March 2022, the Ethiopian government declared an indefinite humanitarian truce, in order to allow the delivery of humanitarian aid into Tigray. During the ceasefire, both Ethiopia and the TPLF agreed to have talks about an official end to the war. A number of outstanding issues – in particular, the presence of pro-government troops in Tigray's Western Zone and restoring access to basic public service to Tigray – were topics of discussion throughout. Though there were initial hopes of finding a peaceful solution to ending the war, the talks soon became characterized by steadily increasing hostilities between the negotiation parties. By August, talks started to break down, with both the Ethiopian government and the TPLF accusing each other of refusing to make peace.

=== Resurgence of fighting (August – November 2022) ===
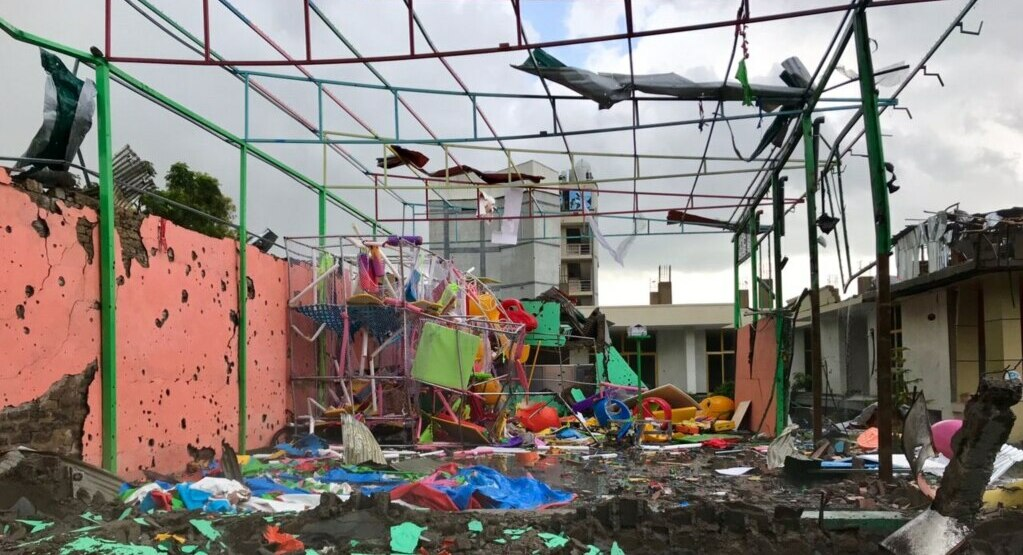
Playground in Mekelle destroyed by an airstrike (26 August 2022)

In late August 2022, after months of ceasefire, fighting resumed. Both sides blamed each other for initiating the fighting, and both also expressed frustration "for a lack of progress towards negotiations to end the 21-month conflict." The fighting itself concentrated in the border area connecting Tigray, Amhara and Afar. Allegations emerged that the Tigray were smuggling in weapons, leading to the Ethiopian Air Force shooting down a plane, claiming it was carrying weapons for the TPLF; meanwhile, the government was accused of indiscriminate air bombardments on civilian targets. Civilians reported that pro-government militias, such as Fano, had gotten involved as well. Exacerbating tensions were severe food shortages, an issue that remained unsolved have particularly affected the Tigray region.

Joint Eritrean–Ethiopian offensive

A map showing the Ethiopian-allied forces' Tigray offensive, 1 September – 3 November 2022

On 27 August, the TDF captured the town of Kobo, following the ENDF's withdrawal. Ethiopia and Eritrea subsequently announced an offensive in North Tigray on 1 September. On 13 September 2022, the TPLF said Eritrea had taken Sheraro. The town's capture by Eritrea and the fighting in nearby areas displaced around 210,000 people, most of whom fled to the city of Shire. A day later Ethiopian airstrikes on Mekelle killed at least ten people. By mid-September, reports emerged of Eritrea engaging in mass mobilization of the country's reservists to be sent to Tigray.

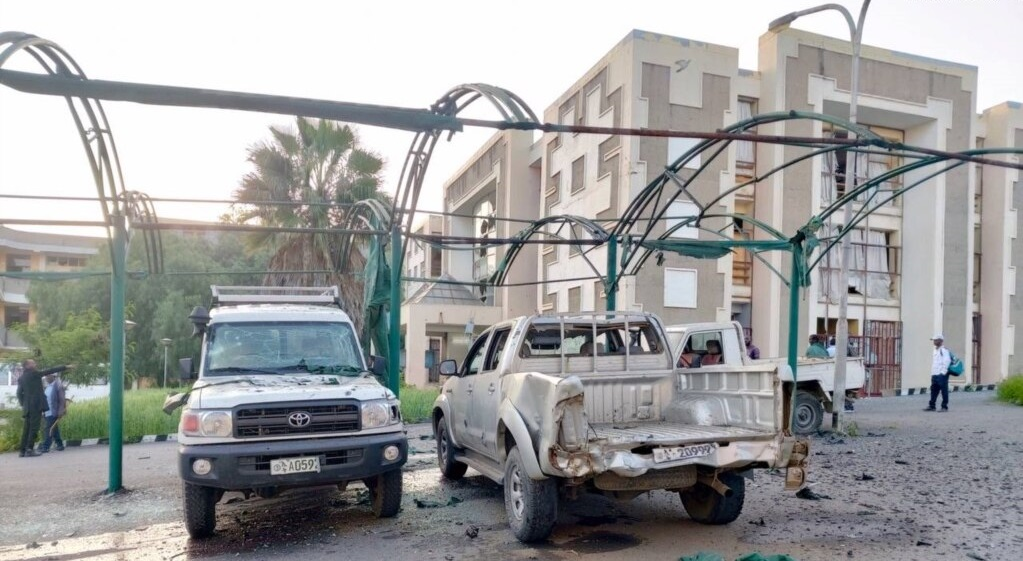
Aftermath of a drone attack on the Adi Haqi campus of Mekelle University (13 September 2022)

On 20 September, the government of Tigray said Eritrea had invaded the region, and that heavy fighting was taking place across northern Tigray. The TDF had, thus far, largely resisted the offensive, and reportedly launched a counterattack to retake Sheraro. Meanwhile, Ethiopian and Eritrean forces began massing in Abala and Berhale in the Afar Region, within striking distance of Mekelle. On 27 September, an airstrike – allegedly carried out by Eritrea – struck the northern town of Adi Dairo while it was celebrating Meskel, killing at least six civilians and injured 19 more. On 2 October, the TPLF announced it had withdrawn troops from Amhara's North Wollo Zone, including Kobo, to be redeployed north to reinforce lines under heavy Eritrean attack but warned it would return if their southern border is threatened. Three days later, a second airstrike hit Adi Dairo, killing between 50 and 65 people according to aid workers in the town.

Full-scale mobilization

On 10 October, the TPLF claimed that Eritrea was escalating its offensive, sending more forces towards Rama, Tserona, and Zalambessa in the far north, with one aid worker saying it is the heaviest fighting since hostilities resumed. Later reports confirmed that Eritrea was intensifying its efforts to mobilize more troops for the war; it detained "elderly mothers and fathers", and sought draft-dodgers. Tigray mobilized its citizens too, calling on every able-bodied person to join the fight. Amidst the three-front offensive launched by Ethiopia and Eritrea, estimates put the number of Ethiopian casualties at over 90,000 in a single month, while Tigrayan casualties were also deemed incredibly high. According to peace and conflict studies researcher Kjetil Tronvoll, it is likely that 100,000 people had been killed over the preceding few weeks, and alleged that Eritrea and Ethiopia were using human wave attacks to overwhelm Tigrayan defenses.

On 17 October, Ethiopia said that it would seize every airport and other key infrastructure in the region; that same day, the strategic city of Shire was taken by Eritrea and Ethiopia, leading to the evacuation of thousands of its inhabitants. Ethiopian forces then took Alamata and Korem in the south. By 22 October, ENDF and EDF-allied forces had also captured Adwa and Axum, even as peace talks with the TPLF were about to commence in South Africa. Witnesses from a number of towns told the Associated Press that Eritrean forces were regularly killing civilians between 23 and 29 October.

=== Second ceasefire (November 2022) ===
On 25 October 2022, AU Commission Chairperson, Moussa Faki, announced that peace talks involving the Ethiopian government and the TPLF had commenced in Pretoria, South Africa. Hopes that these talks could definitively stop the war, however, remained low, as fighting did not appear to slow down, and Ethiopia vocalized their distrust about the peace process. Still, negotiations continued onward, and on 2 November, Ethiopia and the TPLF announced that they had signed an agreement for a cessation of hostilities (made effective the next day on 3 November, marking the second anniversary of the war); however, Eritrea and other warring parties were not involved in the agreement, leaving their status ambiguous. On 12 November, both parties signed a deal to allow humanitarian aid into Tigray. By 29 December, federal police were reported to have returned to Tigray, while flights and internet access had also been restored.

Despite important steps towards peace and deescalation being made between the government and the TPLF, Amhara and Eritrean forces continued to launch attacks on Tigrayans in the months after the agreement was signed.

== Spillover ==
The intensity of the war led to spillover effects on the surrounding countries in the region, particularly in Sudan.

=== Sudan ===
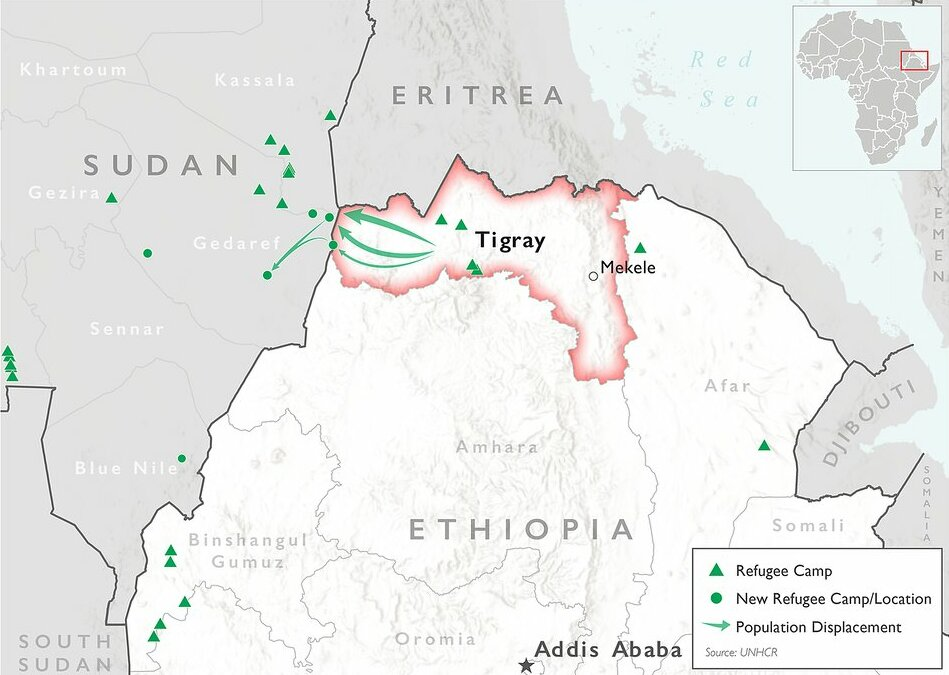
Map showing refugee camp locations. Thousands of people fled across the Ethiopia–Sudan border.

By the end of November 2020, around 44,000 Ethiopian refugees fled to Sudan, with the number rising to over 60,000 by early 2021. Humanitarian concerns intensified as refugee camps in Sudan, such as Um Rakuba and Tunaydbah, faced increasing shortages in food, shelter and other essential services.

On 15 December 2020, a deadly clash occurred near the Ethiopia–Sudan border, where four Sudanese soldiers were killed, and 27 others were injured. Sudan blamed Ethiopian forces and Amhara militias for the ambush, while Ethiopia claimed they were attempting to prevent a Sudanese militia from seizing Ethiopian farmlands.

In response, Sudan increased its military presence along the border, further heightening tensions between the two countries over the Al-Fashaga region, a fertile and disputed borderland territory claimed by both Sudan and Ethiopia, setting the scene for further clashes in 2021 and 2022.

=== Al-Shabaab invasion ===
In late July 2022, the Islamist militant group al-Shabaab launched a coordinated invasion of Ethiopia from Somalia. Multiple observers, including political analyst Matthew Bryden and CNRS researcher Roland Marchal, have speculated that the political instability caused by the Tigray war, the perceived weakening of the Ethiopian state, and the movement of federal troops away from Somalia and towards Tigray, gave al-Shabaab an "opportune time" to launch an offensive.

== International involvement ==
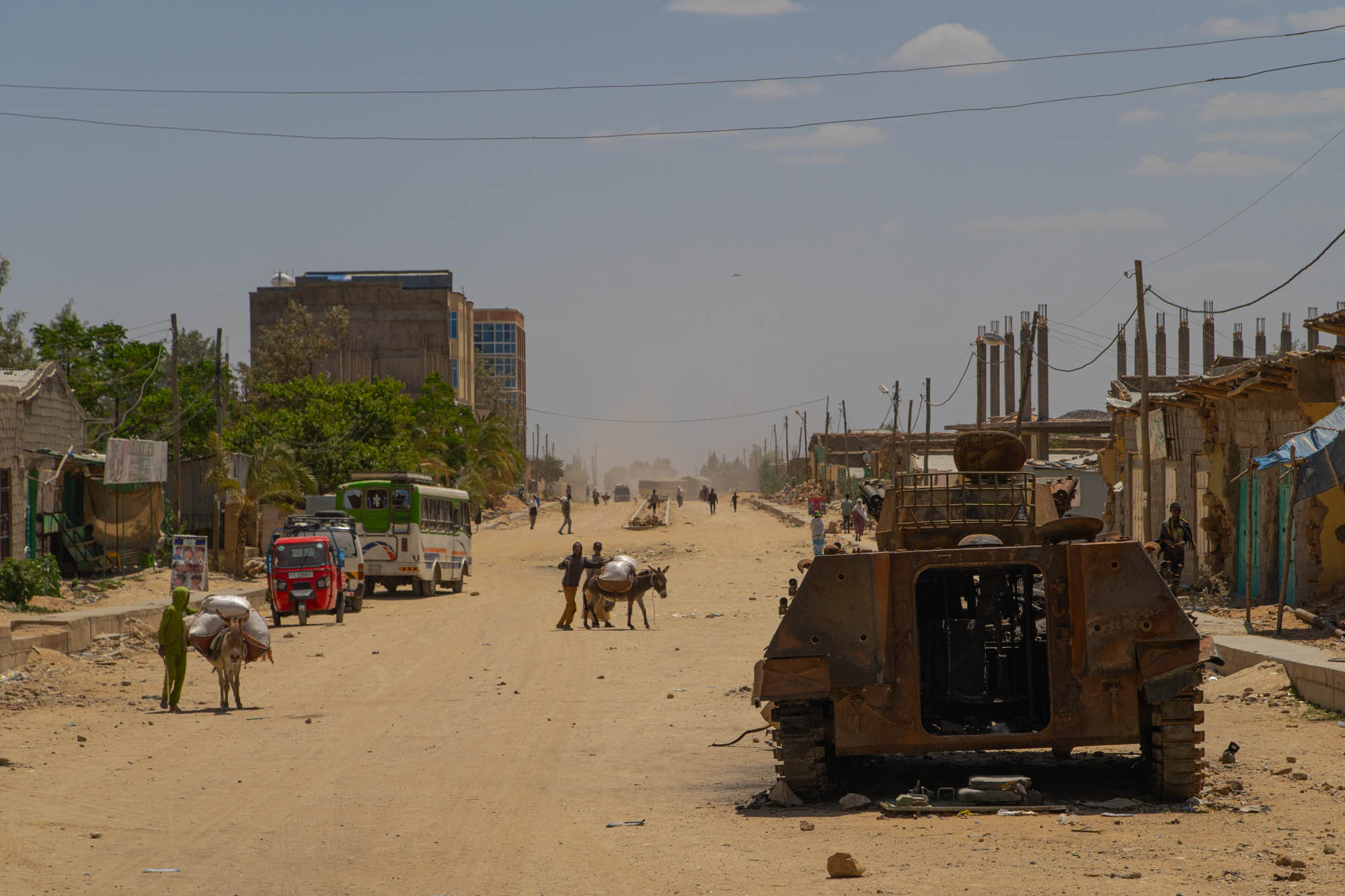
A Chinese-built Type 89 AFV, destroyed by fighting in Hawzen

Since the war began, both regional and international powers have been actively involved in the conflict. A number of reports have been made alleging that China, Turkey and the United Arab Emirates were all providing military support for the Ethiopian government via the sale of weaponized drones. As early as December 2020, there were unconfirmed rumors that Emirati drones were being stationed in the Eritrean port city of Assab. The victory of Ethiopian forces over Dessie and Kombolcha in December 2021 was partly attributed to the drones supplied by Ethiopia's allies. In Debretsion Gebremichael's order to withdraw all his forces from Tigray borders in December 2021, he mentioned "the drones provided by foreign powers" as a major factor that prompted his decision.

=== Alleged Somali involvement ===
Since 2019, Eritrea has been helping the reestablishment of the Somali National Army. There have been unconfirmed reports of Somali troops being sent from a secret training base in Eritrea run by the National Intelligence and Security Agency to fight against the newly formed TDF, though DW News was unable to find evidence of a link between the Somali army and the fighting in Tigray. The first allegations came in January 2021 from unverified social media accounts. The same month, Somalia's information minister, Osman Abukar Dubbe, confirmed Somali soldiers were training in Eritrea, but denied any of these troops had been sent to Tigray.

A small group of parents protested in Mogadishu to demand information on their loved ones who they say they haven't seen in a year. The head of Somalia's parliamentary committee on foreign affairs asked the Somali president to investigate claims by family members that their sons had gone off to fight in Ethiopia and are now missing. In January 2021, the former deputy chief of the Somali National Intelligence and Security Agency, Abdilsalan Guld, claimed based on sources in the Ethiopian military that Somali troops were sent to Tigray. Guld stated that the soldiers, aged from 20 to 30 years old, were secretly taken from Mogadishu and sent to Asmara for military training and that 370 had been killed. Garowe Online reported it could not verify the claims. On 19 January 2021, the Somali government denied the claim that Somali troops had fought in Tigray Region of Ethiopia.

An article in The Globe and Mail published in January 2022 claimed Somali troops were involved and they had committed atrocities in Tigray. It was alleged that before the war began, Somali forces under the leadership of the Eritrean Army had been stationed in trenches along the border. In December 2022, Somali National Army troops began returning from Eritrea back to Somalia. Voice of America reported that it was not able to find any evidence that the soldiers had been ever deployed to Tigray. Various sources have vindicated the Somali governments position that no evidence exists of SNA involvement. In January 2023, the National Security Advisor reiterated that Somali troops training in Eritrea had never participated in the Tigray war and observed that all troops had returned to Somalia.

== Casualties and human rights violations ==
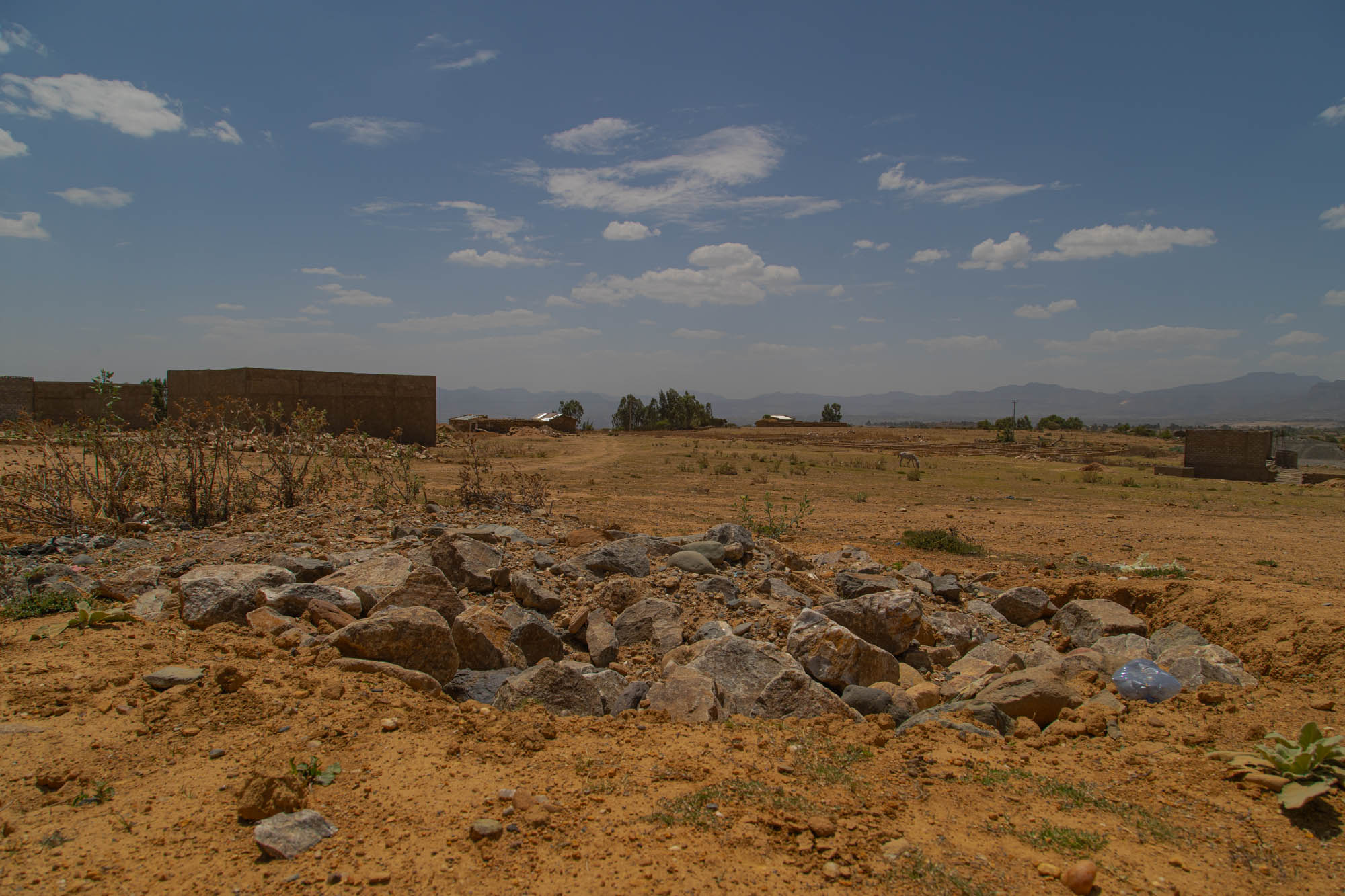
A mass grave of civilian victims in Hawzen, Tigray.

As of May 2023, the combined impact of wartime violence, famine and a lack of medical access had killed an estimated 162,000–378,000 people according to researchers from Ghent University, with other reported estimates reaching numbers as high as 600,000 killed. The Uppsala Conflict Data Program recorded over 100,000 battle-related fatalities to the Tigray conflict in 2022 alone, primarily military but including some civilians. A peer-reviewed study by researchers from the University of London calculated over 102,000 excess deaths in Tigray from November 2020 to mid-2022, of which 72% are from violence and the rest from lack of healthcare and famine. The African Union mediator, Olusegun Obasanjo, publicly stated that the war likely killed around 600,000 people. All sides in the conflict have been accused of committing war crimes and violating international human rights law, with evidence of unlawful killings, torture and sexual violence being widely reported.

=== Crimes against humanity and genocide allegations ===
Many sources have accused the Ethiopian and Eritrean governments of engaging in crimes against humanity via ethnic cleansing of Tigrayans. The Ethiopian and Eritrean governments have also been accused of genocide. According to the EU's special envoy to Ethiopia, Pekka Haavisto, senior members of the Ethiopian government called for "wip[ing] out" all Tigrayans for 100 years. The Ethiopian Government denied the allegations. Similarly, the Tigray Defence Force committed murder and rape of Amhara girls as young as 14 years old.

On 4 June 2021, the non-profit Genocide Watch classified the events in Tigray as step 9 of genocide (eradication), as well as step 10 (denial). They issued another emergency alert on 20 November 2021, stating that "both sides are committing genocide", referring to detentions of thousands of people based on Oromo or Tigrayan ethnic identity, and arguing that "Prime Minister Abiy Ahmed's hate speech and calls for war" together with attacks by the ENDF and TPLF put Ethiopia into stages 4 (dehumanization), 6 (polarization), 8 (persecution), and 9 (extermination) of the ten stages of genocide.

The practice of inserting foreign bodies, including 'nails, screws, plastic rubbish, sand, gravel and letters', into reproductive organs of woman, in what was seen as part of a wider effort to destroy fertility of women in Tigray, would be a genocidal act.

==== Ethnic profiling of Tigrayans ====
Ethnic profiling against Tigrayans occurred during the Tigray war, with Ethiopians of Tigrayan ethnicity being put on indefinite leave from Ethiopian Airlines or refused permission to board, prevented from overseas travel, and an "order of identifying ethnic Tigrayans from all government agencies and NGOs" being used by federal police to request a list of ethnic Tigrayans from an office of the World Food Programme. Tigrayans' houses were arbitrarily searched and Tigrayans' bank accounts suspended. During the conflict, many Tigrayans were profiled both professionally and socially, with many fired or called names when out in public as a result of the conflict, such as Tigrayan military members having their weapons confiscated or dismissed from duty. A hotspot for this form of profiling took place in Addis Ababa, including disappearances of major Ethiopian officials and arrests of Tigrayans on the grounds that they supported the TPLF, which was designated as a terrorist organisation in May 2021 by Ethiopian parliament.

Ethnic Tigrayan members of Ethiopian components of United Nations peacekeeping missions were disarmed and some forcibly flown back to Ethiopia, at the risk of torture or execution, according to United Nations officials. The State of Emergency Taskforce stated that the Tigrayan peacekeepers were returned to Ethiopia because of "infiltration of TPLF elements in various entities." On 1 November 2021, Prime Minister Abiy Ahmed stated that "we should closely follow those who work for the enemy and live amongst us," as reports of a new roundup of ethnic Tigrayans came out of Addis Ababa.

=== Sexual violence ===
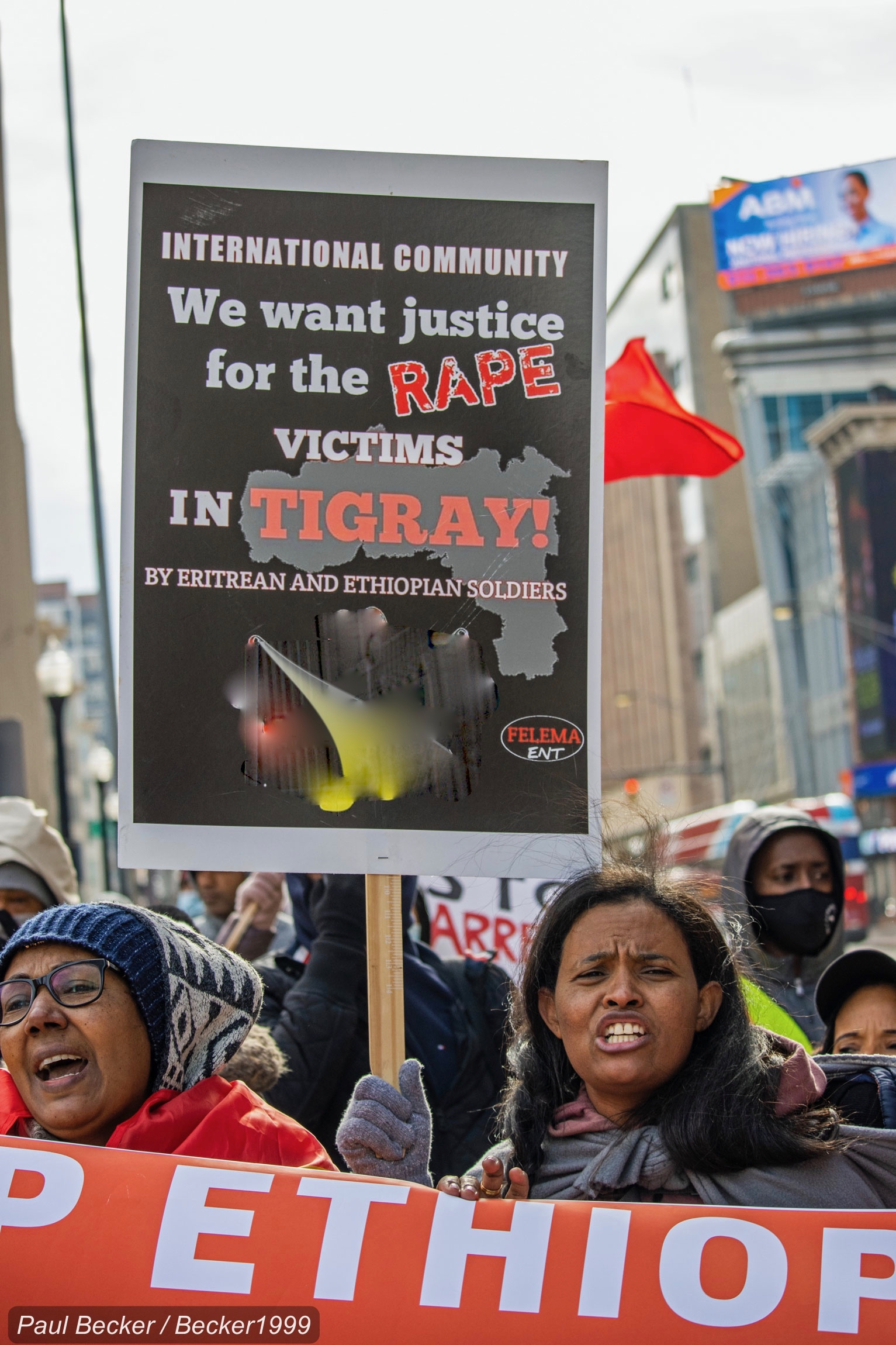
Protest against rape and sexual violence in Tigray

Wartime rape and sexual violence was also widespread, being perpetrated by virtually all sides. There were "deeply distressing reports of sexual and gender-based violence, extrajudicial killings, [and the] widespread destruction and looting of public and private property by all parties" according to the UN High Commissioner for Human Rights. More than 136 cases of rape were reported in hospitals in Mekelle, Ayder, Adigrat and Wukro in eastern Tigray between December 2020 and January 2021, with indications that there are many more such unreported cases. As of August 2021, there were 512 to 514 rape victims registered with Ethiopian hospitals; however, the real number is probably much larger than that and can be as large as 120,000 by some estimations, and many sources believe the sexual violence in Tigray was intentionally committed with the purpose of destroying the morale of the enemy, to genocide and genetically cleanse certain populations, and to spread STIs as a form of biological warfare.

Often, soldiers, and militias subjected Tigrayan women and girls, including pregnant women and young girls, to rape, gang rape, sexual slavery, sexual mutilation, and other forms of sexual torture. Such sexual violence is often accompanied with other forms of physical and mental abuse, including burning their victims with hot iron or cigarettes, forcing metal rods or nails into their victim's genitals, raping their victim in front of their family members, forcing their victims to rape their family members, calling their victims by derogatory words and ethnic slurs, etc. There were also reports that Tigrayan forces had gang-raped dozens of women and underage girls in at least two towns in the Amhara Region, and girls – some as young as 14 – were identified as victims of rape in the towns of Chenna and Kobo in August and September 2021.

After being subjected to sexual violence, many women become infected with STIs like HIV, who face difficulty getting treatment due to a sense of shame, as well as the collapse of medical infrastructure caused by the war.

A survey estimated that, over the course of the conflict, around 1 in 10 women in Tigray were subjected to sexual violence, 8 in 100 were subjected to rape, and 4 in 100 were subjected to gang rape. Nails, screws, plastic rubbish and other foreign bodies were forced into reproductive organs of woman, in what was seen as part of a wider effort to destroy fertility of women in Tigray.

=== Investigations ===
Investigations into the war crimes include the Ethiopian Human Rights Commission (EHRC) and Office of the United Nations High Commissioner for Human Rights (OHCHR) joint investigation, and the ACHPR Tigray investigation by the African Commission on Human and Peoples' Rights (ACHPR).

== Humanitarian crisis ==
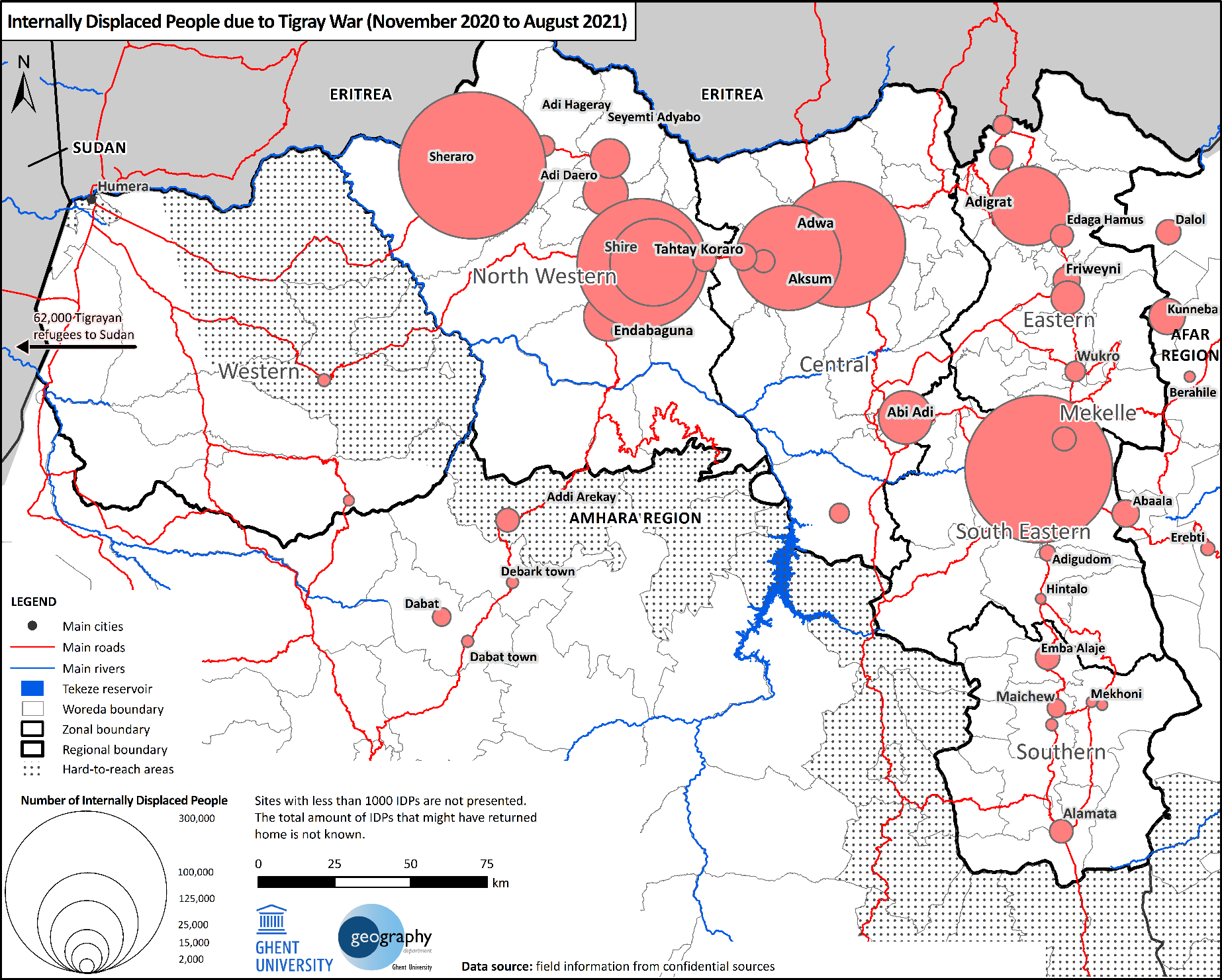
Distribution of internally displaced persons in Tigray (August 2021)

In February 2021, GOAL Ethiopia, the International Rescue Committee (IRC), MCMDO, MSF-Spain, and World Vision, found that nearly one in seven children in 16 woredas and town administrations across Tigray were acutely malnourished. While in Enderta, Abi Adi and Shire, GOAL and IRC reported that 16.6% of children screened had acute malnutrition with 3.5% suffering from severe acute malnutrition.

There was limited access to clean water due to hygiene and sanitation services largely being disrupted across Tigray. The Tigray Regional Water Bureau reported that out of 36 villages it assessed, only 4 had partially functioning water sources. Along with that, an estimated 250 motorized water pumping systems have been out of order, and the status of 11,000 hand pumps in rural areas was unknown. Because of this, there was a heightened risk of outbreaks of waterborne diseases and COVID-19.

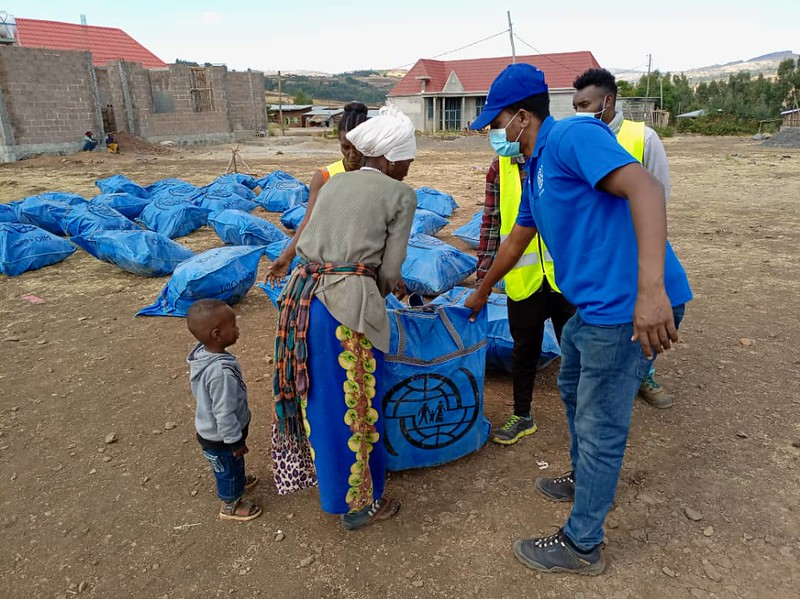
Aid workers providing shelter kits in Tigray, wearing masks to protect themselves from COVID-19 (March 2021)

According to the UN, in March 2021, out of more than 260 health centres in Tigray before the war, only 31 were fully functional, while 7 were partially functional. According to the World Health Organization (WHO), all of the functioning hospitals and health centres in Tigray had a lack of medical supplies, drugs, and equipment. UN partners reported continued looting of health facilities. Only 16% of the health facilities had vaccination services and only 17% had maternal services (antenatal care, birth delivery, etc.).

In late October 2022, it was revealed that the Tigray Region was running out of medical supplies, with the CEO of their largest hospital saying it was "doomed to collapse soon". WHO officials stated that childhood vaccination rates had plummeted from 90% (before the war) to under 10%.

=== Humanitarian aid ===
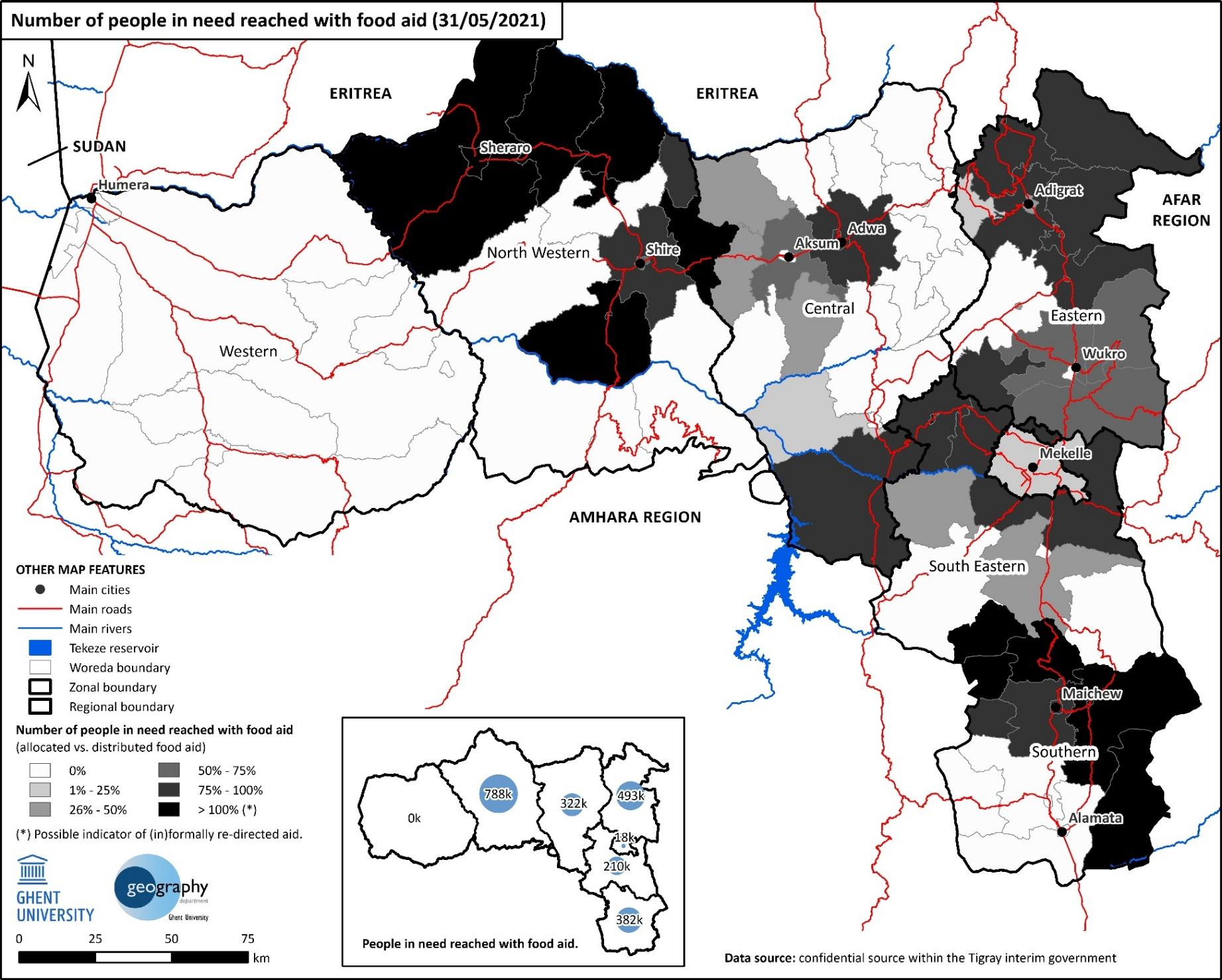
The percentage of people in need who had been reached with food aid as of 31 May 2021. White=0% and Black=100%.

According to the United Nations (UN), some 2.3 million children have been cut off from desperately needed aid and humanitarian assistance. Since the start of the conflict, the Ethiopian federal government has strictly controlled access to the Tigray Region, and the UN has said it is frustrated that talks with the Ethiopian government had not yet secured adequate humanitarian access for "food, including ready-to-use therapeutic food for the treatment of child malnutrition, medicines, water, fuel, and other essentials that are running low" said UNICEF. By 13 March 2021, the UN and its partners reached about 900,000 people with complete food baskets, and 700,000 people with clean water. Despite the progress made, many are still hard to reach due to ongoing fighting. About 4.5 million people of are still in need of aid and about 1 million of that are not in accessible areas due to ongoing fighting.

On 31 August 2021, USAID's mission director in Ethiopia, Sean Jones said: "We do have proof that several of our warehouses have been looted and completely emptied in the areas, particularly in Amhara, where TPLF soldiers have gone into, I do believe that the TPLF has been very opportunistic," in a televised interview with state broadcaster EBC in Addis Ababa. All parties to the conflict have been accused by USAID of looting aid shipments.

By the summer of 2022, the government blockade of essential services to Tigray was still in place, and the humanitarian situation remained severe, with roughly 13 million people being in need of food aid. According to the World Food Programme, while international aid had technically been allowed into the region during the 2022 ceasefire, in practice, very little aid was reaching the people that needed it most, largely due to fuel not being made available in these areas. On 25 August (one day after the war resumed), the WFP accused the TPLF of stealing 570,000 liters of fuel meant to transport humanitarian aid. On 29 October the same year, UNICEF reported that around 29.7 million people in Ethiopia were in need of humanitarian assistance.

=== Internal and forced displacement ===
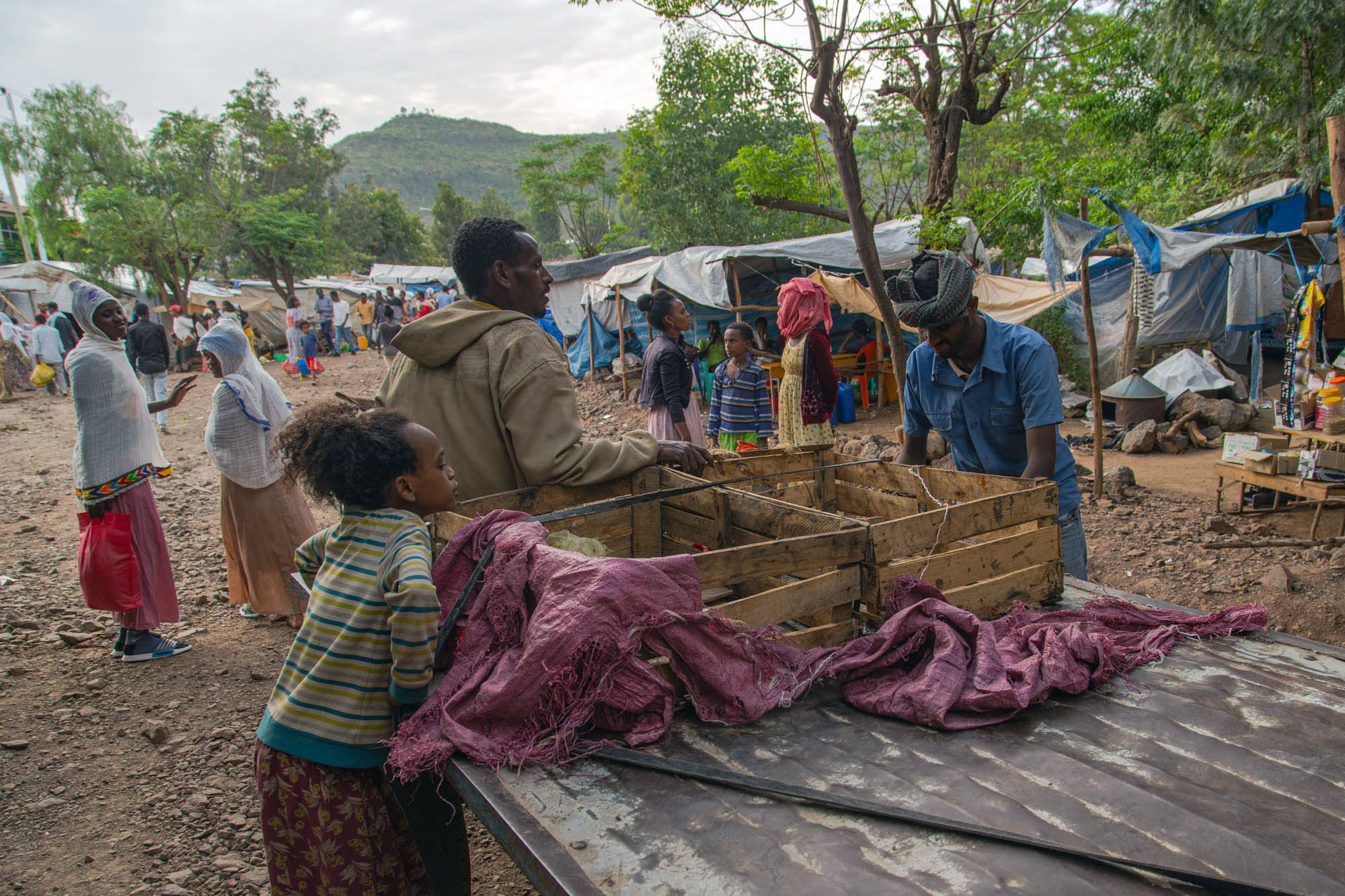
Family in a crowded IDP camp in Shire, Tigray (June 2021)

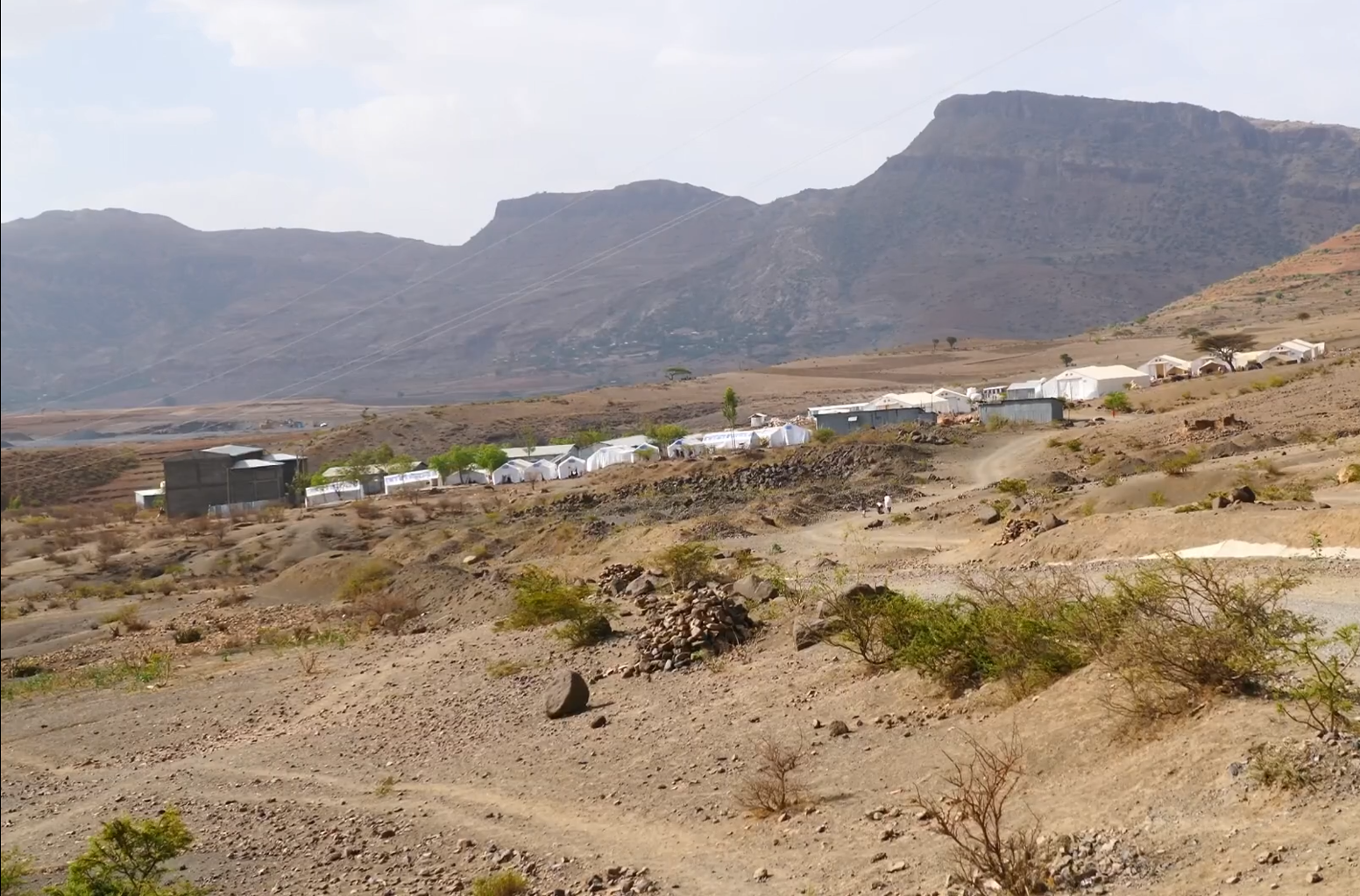
IDP camp in Soqota, Amhara (May 2022)

In December 2020, the UN estimated more than one million people had been internally displaced by the fighting. More than 50,000 people have fled to Sudan due to the conflict. Communications and travel links were still blocked, and Human Rights Watch warned that "actions that deliberately impede relief supplies" would violate international humanitarian law. Possible COVID-19 outbreaks were feared as refugees fleeing the Tigray conflict sheltered in crowded camps. By March 2021, Shire had become a major centre for internally displaced people and humanitarian aid distribution.

In September 2021, the humanitarian situation continued to worsen in Tigray, Afar and Amhara Regions, due both to the armed conflict itself and due to bureaucratic obstruction. Two thousand displaced people returned to the Fantí Rasu zone in Afar Region after the ENDF and Afar Special Forces regained control and OCHA partner organisations' access to improved.

UNICEF stated that by the end of September 2022, around 574,000 more people in Afar, Amhara and Tigray were left displaced after fighting resumed in August 2022; they also reported that over 870,000 had become refugees.

==== Western Zone of Tigray ====
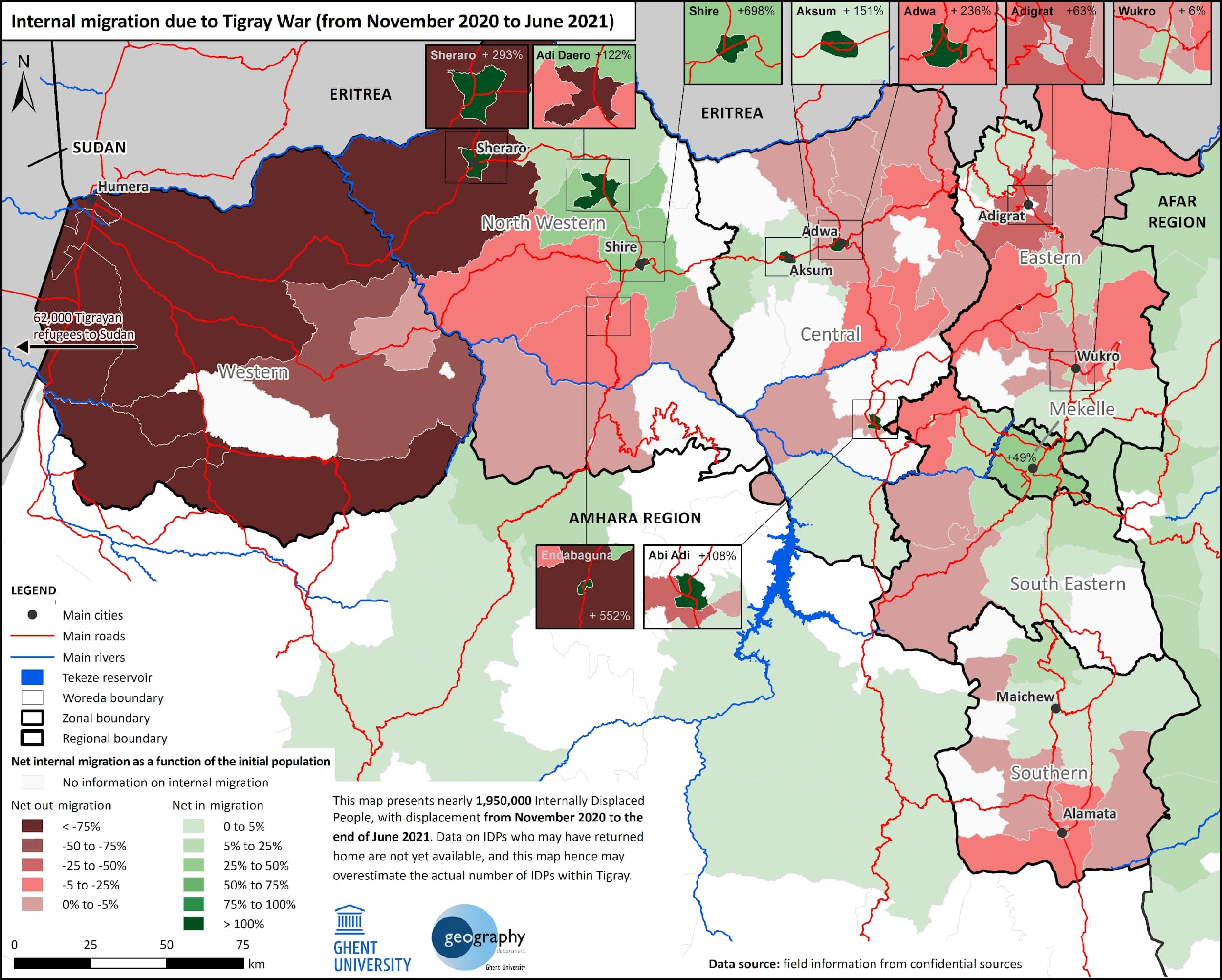
Internal migration due to the Tigray war. Red is a decrease in population while green is an increase.

In November 2020, Amhara Region Special Forces and Amhara militias loyal to the Amhara regional government took control of the western zone of Tigray in order to settle a decades-old land dispute. They claim the area was taken from them by force in 1992 after TPLF forces overthrew the communist PDRE government and divided the country into ethnic regional states. They have also claimed the woredas (districts) of Welkait, Tsegede, Kafta Humera, Tselemti, and Raya Azebo to be theirs.

Since then, the area has been under the de facto control of Amhara regional authorities. Their control has been marked by reports of ethnically motivated violence and forced displacement. By February 2021, about 45,000 civilians had been forced to leave the zone due to extrajudicial killings, arbitrary detentions, and the disappearances of people, especially young men. One refugee interviewed by Reuters said that if they didn't leave when they did, they would have been killed by Amhara forces. 41 other refugees interviewed have also described attacks, looting, and threats by Amhara forces.

In March 2021, Mulu Nega, then leader of the federal-government-appointed Transitional Government of Tigray, stated that Amhara de facto administrators of Western Tigray used violence against ethnic Tigrayans and forcibly displaced them. Yabsira Eshetie, the administrator of the area, denied the claims. The Amhara government also denied the reports of forced displacement and asked the Ethiopian government to modify the border between the Amhara and Tigray regions. US Secretary of State Antony Blinken stated that there had been acts of ethnic cleansing in Tigray.

==== Refugees in Sudan ====
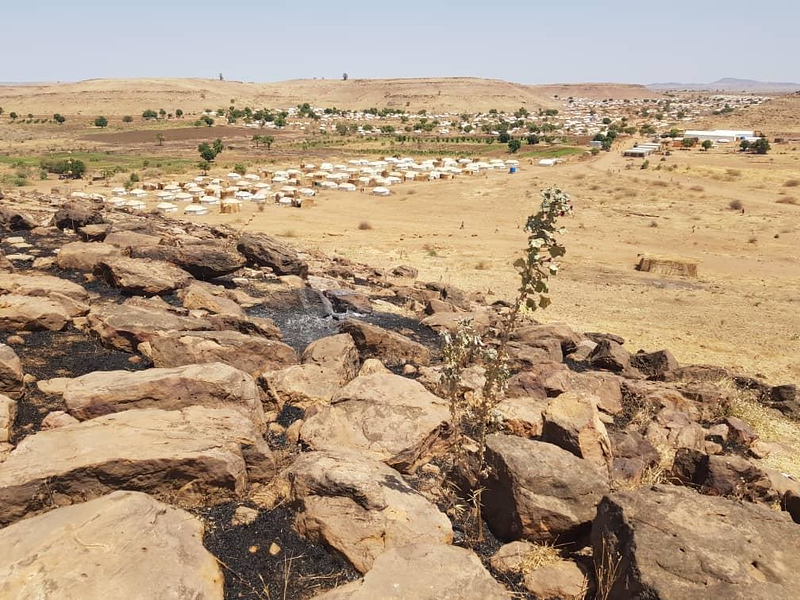
Ethiopian refugee camp in Sudan

Some Tigrayans who fled to Sudan as refugees would later find themselves victimized again by human traffickers upon arrival. Many refugees had testified being kidnapped, regularly tortured, and transported to warehouses in Libya, where many would die due to poor living conditions. Eritrean refugees faced similar risks, as, in addition to the traffickers, they also risked getting kidnapped by the Eritrean government. This situation worsened further after Sudan descended into violence in 2023, placing refugees at further risk of being kidnapped.

==== Eritrean refugees ====
In November 2020, the UN warned of "very critical" supply shortages for the nearly 100,000 Eritrean refugees who, prior to the war, were registered in four camps in Tigray region. Later that same month, the UN reported that people in Tigray were fleeing Mekelle. The federal government had warned of "no mercy" if Tigray forces and residents remained intermingled. As of 2 February 2021, 20,000 of the Eritrean refugees in Tigray, mostly from the Hitsats and Shimelba camps, remained unaccounted for, according to the United Nations High Commissioner for Refugees.

== Internet and media ==
Internationally the Tigray war received less coverage compared to other conflicts taking place at the time.

=== Role of online social networks ===
Claire Wilmot, writing in The Washington Post, found that a significant number of new, single-issue Twitter accounts were opened in the immediate aftermath of the Northern Command attacks. Most appeared to be authentic accounts from people seeking to raise international awareness of the conflict in the midst of a communications blackout in Tigray. The Ethiopian government cited disinformation and hate speech to justify communications blackouts. Researchers suggested that reducing access to information could help to create contexts where misinformation can thrive because it reduces the ability to verify information. In late July 2021, a report emerged that there was coordination in social media messaging and media reportage of the conflict in Ethiopia, to an extent it mirrored an earlier Syrian hybrid information campaign designated as Project Basma.

The Ethiopian government tried to control the information environment by positioning itself as the sole provider of reliable information. In February, pro-government groups called on their supporters in Ethiopia and the diaspora to combat what they called "TPLF fake news" online. Pro-government groups used tactics similar to those of pro-Tigray groups to push their narrative of the conflict, though as of 5 February, pro-government campaigns had produced fewer Tweets overall. Both Agence France-Presse and BBC News have documented examples of old or manipulated photos, which misleadingly endorsed either the federal Ethiopian government or the TPLF.

Researchers found that groups use tactics such as "copy and paste" campaigns hosted on websites, which include instructions for opening new accounts, copying and pasting pre-written tweets, and tagging influencers. Both campaigns produced disinformation and misinformation, though the majority of content produced was activist in nature. Wilmot suggested that the lines between authentic political activity and deliberate manipulation of online content during the conflict were increasingly blurred.

==== Facebook ====
Facebook has been heavily criticized for its perceived role in fuelling ethnic tensions during the war, and has faced accusations that, in choosing not to crack down on hate speech being spread by Ethiopian users, it is complicit in cases of ethnic cleansing in the country.

=== Restriction of media coverage ===
The Ethiopian government had engaged in repeated crackdowns on media coverage throughout the war. In November 2021 (during the 2021–2022 state of emergency), the Ethiopian Media Authority (EMA) threatened to cancel the media licences of BBC News, Reuters, CNN and Associated Press, accusing the news organisations of having "consistently disseminated news that sowed seeds of animosity among people and compromised the sovereignty of the country." The EMA cited "reporting the Law enforcement operation as a genocidal campaign" as an example of misleading information aiming to "undermin[e] the [federal] government's efforts to address the humanitarian crisis in the Tigray region."

On 20 May 2022, Ethiopian law enforcement began arresting journalists en masse, with 4,500 people in the Amhara Region alone being taken into custody. One Amhara law enforcement official described this as a way to maintain "law and order" and "get rid of outside enemies".

The media restrictions resulted in what has been described as an "information blackout". Many journalists, both local and international, have noted the difficulty they face in trying to report on the war, as they risk the possibility of getting either killed or imprisoned by government forces. By December 2021, the Committee to Protect Journalists described both Ethiopia and Eritrea as the worst "jailers of journalists" in sub-Saharan Africa.

== Peace process ==
Several proposals for peace negotiations and mediation were made involving some of the main groups involved in the war. Of these, this includes: an emergency Intergovernmental Authority on Development summit in December 2020; a joint statement by the National Congress of Great Tigray, the Tigray Independence Party, and Salsay Weyane Tigray describing their eight pre-conditions for peace in February 2021; a mediation group called "A3+1", (consisting of three African countries, Kenya, Niger and Tunisia, and one non-African country, Saint Vincent and the Grenadines) in July–August 2021; and a March–August 2022 ceasefire wherein Ethiopian and Tigrayan officials attempted to negotiate a peaceful end to the conflict.

On 2 November 2022, the Ethiopian government and Tigrayan leaders signed a peace accord, with the African Union as a mediator, and agreed on "orderly, smooth and coordinated disarmament". The agreement was made effective the next day on 3 November, marking the second anniversary of the war.

As part of this process, Prime Minister Abiy Ahmed appointed TPLF's Getachew Reda as head of the Interim Regional Administration of Tigray, and the Ethiopian parliament removed the TPLF from its terrorism list.

== Reactions ==
The Tigray war has been the subject of numerous reactions and protests, both locally and worldwide.

The Commission of Inquiry on Tigray Genocide was established by Tigrayan authorities in May 2022 to document the conflict. A report was released in October 2025, documenting their findings.

== Aftermath ==
=== Health impacts ===
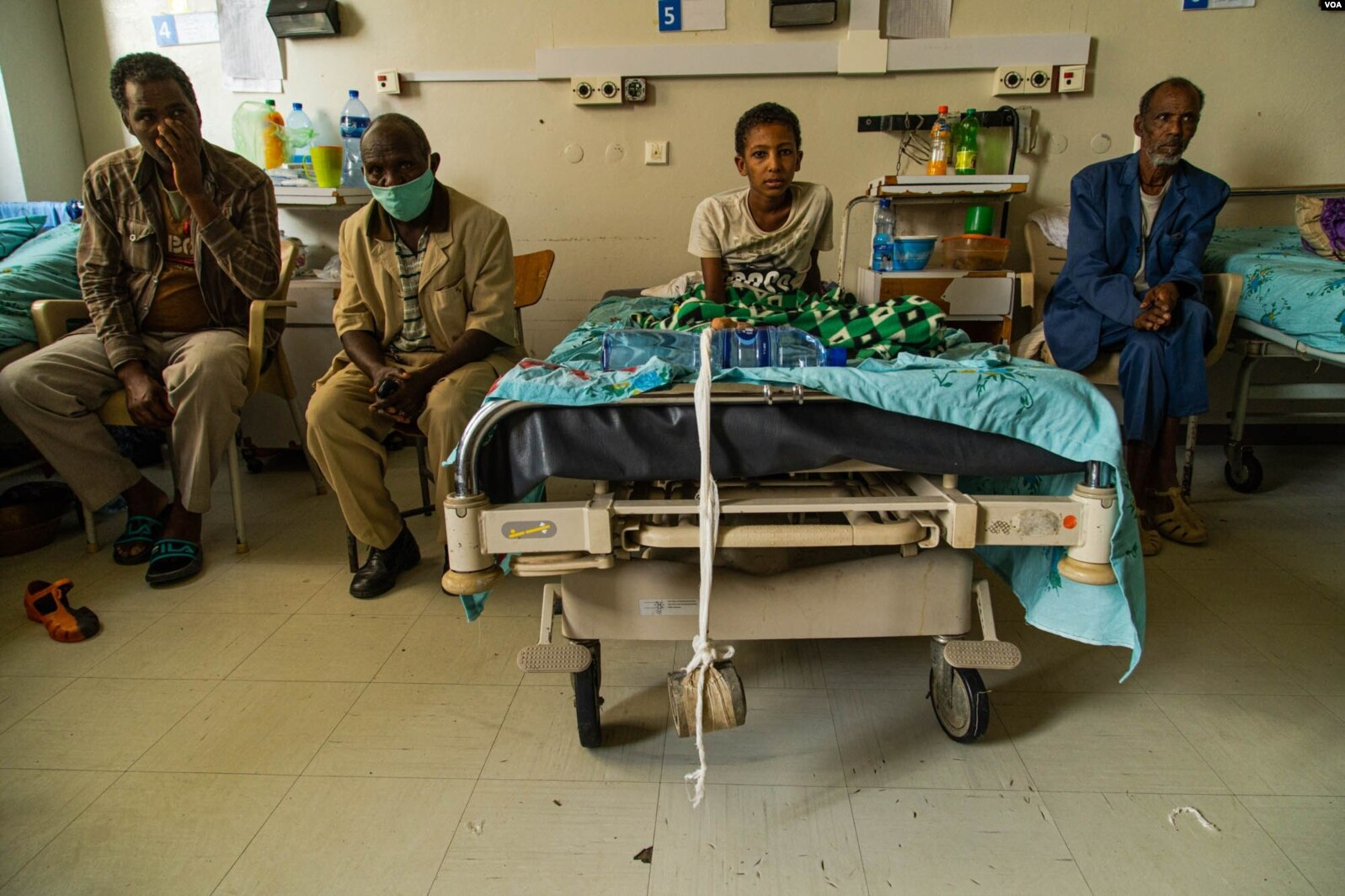
A wounded child at Ayder Hospital in Mekelle, Tigray

The war had a devastating impact on the healthcare system of Tigray; of the 853 health facilities in the region, 86% were at least partially damaged; 232 of them were left "completely unusable", and 28 were destroyed entirely.

It also led to a higher rate of maternal and infant mortality in the Tigray Region. In a study funded by UNFPA Ethiopia and UNICEF Ethiopia, it was estimated that maternal mortality rates had increased from 186 deaths per 100,000 people pre-war to 840 deaths per 100,000 people post-war. A health coordinator at the Tigray Health Bureau said to Addis Standard in June 2023, that, according to their research, both maternal and infant mortality rates had regressed to the levels they were at in 2001.

According to Tigrayan health official Tsegay Gidey, 81% of mothers in the Seharti Samre woreda had birth defects, and 32 newborn infants had died between January and June 2023.

=== Economic impact ===
Destroyed residential buildings and military hardware in Werkamba, Tigray (December 2020).

The war had a costly impact on the Ethiopian economy. In late November 2022, the cost of rebuilding was estimated to be around $20 billion. The cost of rebuilding healthcare facilities in the Tigray, Afar and Amhara Regions was at least $1.4 billion, being devastated by the war. Between June 2022 and March 2023, government debt had increased by 6%, reaching a debt total of roughly $60.6 billion (3.3 trillion birr).

The Tigray war also damaged the country's relationship with foreign creditors. Shortly after it began in November 2020, the European Union suspended budget support to Ethiopia (citing reports of human rights abuses), a decision they would maintain until the end of the war. The credit agency Fitch Ratings downgraded Ethiopia's credit rating in January 2023, expressing lower confidence that the Ethiopian government would be able to pay off their external debt.

Inflation hit the country hard in the months following the war. Ethiopia had an average inflation rate of 30% in 2022, largely driven by food prices; in February 2023, the overall inflation rate reached 32%; by 12 September 2023 (Enkutatash), Ethiopia continued to experience high inflation, with commonly purchased food items becoming more expensive. Although the war has not been considered the sole reason for these economic struggles, it has still been described as a contributing factor.

=== Continued Eritrean occupation ===
Although the war largely came to a halt after the peace agreement was signed, Eritrea continues to occupy parts of Tigray as of late-2024. The EDF has been responsible for the deaths of thousands of people in northern Ethiopia since November 2022; from 17 to 25 November alone, Eritrea was reported to have destroyed 241 houses and killed at least 111 people. by 30 December, it was estimated that Eritrean and Amhara forces killed 3,700 since the signing of the peace deal.

The Tigray Health Bureau noted that 852 cases of rape and sexual assault were reported between November and December 2022; according to aid workers and interviews with survivors, most of these were committed by Eritrean forces.

As of January 2023, over half of Irob district was occupied by Eritrea. Irob advocacy groups and former residents have described it as a "de-facto annexation" of the area. A religious Irob leader told The Guardian in August 2023 that Eritrea was blocking off international aid to the area, and lamented that "there has been no improvement for us since the peace."

According to a report published in June 2025 by United States based group The Sentry, the EDF have continued this practice of occupation of the Tigray region. This practice has been aided by the lifting of sanctions unilaterally by the United Nations, which has also created conditions for the EDF and TPLF to fund and train Fano militias.

=== Renewed conflict ===
In late January 2026, clashes erupted in the Tigray region. Fighting involved Tigrayan forces and Ethiopian federal troops supported by Amhara militias in parts of western Tigray that Amhara forces had not withdrawn from despite the 2022 Pretoria peace agreement. Diplomatic sources confirmed the clashes but said the situation on the ground remained unclear. The TPLF said its central committee "has decided to reinstate the Tigray Government Assembly (parliament), which had been suspended in the name of peace". The statement accused the federal government of violating the 2022 Pretoria Agreement, which ended the war, and of provoking armed conflict within the Tigray region. It also accused the government of withholding funds to pay local civil servants.

Large-scale fighting in northern Ethiopia eventually resumed by late 2026, as TPLF forces (now part of a larger coaliton of rebel groups) declared a defensive war against Ethiopia in September that year. Eritrea also got involved militarily, with Ethiopia accusing Eritrea of supporting rebel groups; In the years since 2022, relations between Ethiopia and Eritrea had rapidly deteriorated, and unresolved regional tensions involving Sudan and Egypt began to emerge as well.

== See also ==
- 2020 in Eritrea
- 2020 in Ethiopia
- Eritrean–Ethiopian War
  - Eritrean–Ethiopian border conflict
- Ethiopian Civil War (1974–1991)
- List of civil wars
- Fano insurgency
- Ethiopian feminists facing digital gender-based violence
