= Reinstatement of the Tigray Regional Council =

Political crisis in Ethiopia starting in 2026

- Part of the Tigray political crisis
- Date: April 15, 2026 – present
- Location: Tigray Region, Ethiopia
- Caused by: Stalled implementation of the 2022 Pretoria Agreement; Unilateral federal extension of the Tigray Interim Administration (TIA) mandate; Exclusion of Tigray from the June 2026 Ethiopian national elections; Escalating internal TPLF leadership divisions
- Goals: Re-establishment of pre-war regional sovereignty and administrative control by the TPLF
- Methods: Unilateral legislative reconvening, parallel executive appointments, high-level military alignment ("Corps and Above"), local administrative endorsements
- Status: Ongoing dual-power deadlock; fragmentation of regional authority with federal budgetary and fuel restrictions implemented by Addis Ababa; controversy over alleged forced recruitment campaigns and proposed compulsory mobilization legislation

Parties
Tigray People's Liberation Front (TPLF): Reinstated Tigray State Council (Baito); Supporting "Corps and Above" military structures	Interim Regional Administration of Tigray (TIA): Federal government of Ethiopia; Tigray Peace and Change Council	Opposition factions: Salsay Weyane Tigray (Sawet)

Lead figures
Debretsion Gebremichael; Amanuel Assefa; Kiros Hagos	Lt. Gen. Tadesse Werede; Getachew Reda; Abiy Ahmed
- Security measures in Mekelle tightened following an explosion near the Regional President's Office on May 4, 2026.

The Reinstatement of the Tigray Regional Council is an ongoing constitutional and political crisis in the Tigray Region of Ethiopia that began in April 2026. The crisis erupted when the Tigray People's Liberation Front (TPLF) unilaterally reconstituted the 2020 pre-war regional legislature (the Baito), declaring it the sole sovereign authority in the region.

The move effectively created a parallel governance structure, directly challenging the authority of the federally recognized Tigray Interim Administration (TIA) led by Lieutenant General Tadesse Worede.

The crisis later expanded to include disputes over military mobilization, allegations of forced recruitment, and debate surrounding a proposed wartime mobilization law drafted by the reinstated council.

== Background ==
Following the signing of the Pretoria Agreement in November 2022, the Interim Regional Administration of Tigray was established as a transitional governing body intended to stabilize the war-torn region. However, implementation of the peace deal stagnated over unresolved constitutional territories (such as Western Tigray), delays in disarming and reintegrating forces, and the failure to return nearly one million internally displaced persons (IDPs).

Tensions escalated dramatically in early 2026 when the federal government under Prime Minister Abiy Ahmed unilaterally extended the mandate of the TIA by one year and suspended voting in 30 Tigrayan constituencies, excluding the region from the June 2026 national elections. Concurrently, a severe political fracture emerged within Tigray between TPLF officials and TIA leadership regarding the pace and direction of the post-war transition.

== Timeline of Reconstitution ==
=== The Axum Mobilization (April 15–19, 2026) ===
From April 15 to 19, 2026, the TPLF Central Committee convened an emergency session in Axum. The pivotal turning point occurred when senior party elites secured explicit backing from high-level military commanders within the "Corps and Above" structures of the Tigray forces. On April 20, the TPLF issued a formal declaration stating that the regional council elected by 2.8 million voters in 2020 remained the only valid democratic mandate, labeling the federal extension of the TIA unconstitutional. Following this announcement, multiple local district administrations (including Wukro, Enticho, and Shiraro) issued public endorsements, which the TPLF cited as a bottom-up mandate.

=== Reassembly and Leadership Changes (May 5, 2026) ===
On May 5, 2026, the Tigray State Council reconvened in Mekelle for its "sixth term, sixth regular session" after a three-and-a-half-year suspension. Security in the capital was heavily fortified following an unexplained explosion near the Regional President's Office the previous evening, alongside reported overhead maneuvers by federal military aircraft.

The council executed several immediate structural measures:

- Approved a motion to resume permanent legislative activities.
- Elected Kiros Hagos as Speaker and Mihret Berhe as Deputy Speaker, with the oath administered by the President of the Tigray Supreme Court.
- Elected TPLF Chairman Debretsion Gebremichael as President of the regional government.

In his inauguration address, Debretsion explicitly rejected federal control, stating: "The people of Tigray did not struggle for a temporary appointment from Addis Ababa... We are restoring the institutional dignity of our region."

=== Executive Overhaul (June 1–2, 2026) ===
Following a week-long emergency meeting that resulted in severe disciplinary measures against internal dissenters, the council held its 4th Extraordinary Session on June 1, 2026. The assembly unanimously approved an entirely restructured organizational layout for regional bureaus. Debretsion submitted a slate of senior appointments, highlighted by swearing in TPLF Vice Chairperson Amanuel Assefa as Deputy President and Head of the Justice Bureau.

=== Escalating Security Tensions (June 2026) ===
Following the reinstatement of the pre-war regional council and the formation of a parallel executive structure, political tensions in Tigray continued to intensify throughout June 2026.

Reports of military recruitment campaigns emerged from multiple parts of the region, while growing concerns were raised regarding the possibility of renewed armed confrontation between regional and federal actors.

At the same time, the Legal Standing Committee of the reinstated council prepared a draft wartime mobilization proclamation that would establish a legal framework for compulsory military mobilization and wartime administration. The proposal generated debate among legal experts, journalists, opposition figures, and human-rights organizations regarding its implications for civil liberties and freedom of expression.

== Military Mobilization Controversy ==
=== Allegations of Forced Recruitment ===
Amid the political dispute between the TPLF-reinstated regional council and the federally recognized Tigray Interim Administration (TIA), reports emerged in 2026 alleging widespread forced military recruitment across parts of Tigray.

On 4 June 2026, Human Rights First Ethiopia (HRFE) released an investigative report claiming that coercive recruitment campaigns and mass roundups (afesa) had occurred in several areas of Tigray, including the Northwestern, Central, and Eastern zones. The report documented testimonies from 27 witnesses, including family members, local officials, former recruits, and individuals who allegedly escaped conscription.

According to the report, recruitment efforts targeted former Tigray Defense Forces members, households that had not previously contributed family members during the 2020–2022 conflict, and groups of young people gathered in public locations such as markets, mining sites, entertainment venues, and religious sites. HRFE alleged that some individuals were detained, transported to military facilities, or compelled to join military units against their will.

The organization argued that such practices violated provisions of the Ethiopian Constitution, the African Charter on Human and Peoples' Rights, and international human rights instruments concerning arbitrary detention and forced labor.

=== Draft National Mobilization Proclamation ===
On 9 June 2026, Addis Standard reported that the Legal Standing Committee of the reinstated pre-war Tigray State Council had prepared a draft proclamation intended to establish a legal framework for wartime mobilization and administration.

According to the draft, citizens called for national mobilization would be legally required to comply with recruitment orders. The proposed legislation would impose criminal penalties on individuals who evade military service, assist others in avoiding recruitment, or obstruct mobilization efforts.

The draft would also criminalize speech or activities deemed to discourage recruitment, undermine military operations, or support hostile actors. Addis Standard reported that the proposal included penalties ranging from imprisonment to, in the most serious cases, life imprisonment or capital punishment.

Media organizations could additionally face fines, suspension, or revocation of operating licenses for publishing information authorities consider harmful to mobilization efforts or national security.

The proposal generated debate among journalists, legal analysts, and rights advocates, who expressed concern that the provisions could restrict freedom of expression and reporting on recruitment practices. Supporters argued that the measures were necessary to address growing security concerns and organize society for collective defense.

=== Reactions ===
The draft proclamation emerged amid increasing allegations of forced recruitment and heightened political tensions following the TPLF's reactivation of the pre-war regional council.

Human rights organizations and opposition actors called for independent investigations into recruitment practices and urged authorities to comply with human rights standards and the provisions of the Pretoria Agreement.

== Domestic and International Responses ==
=== The Tigray Interim Administration (TIA) ===
Interim President Lt. Gen. Tadesse Worede vehemently condemned the TPLF's maneuvers, labeling the reactivation of the pre-war council an explicit violation of the Pretoria Peace Agreement. Tadesse rejected all demands for his resignation, stating that leadership transitions must be guided strictly by legal procedures rather than "informal pressure or social media campaigns." He warned that establishing parallel executive structures was forcing Tigray down a "dangerous course of action" that threatened fragile post-war stability. Tadesse also noted acute frictions with federal authorities, who had justified fuel and budget restrictions by accusing regional actors of hoarding supplies to prepare for renewed hostilities.

=== Tigrayan Opposition Parties ===
Opposition groups inside Tigray strongly rebuked the TPLF's actions. On May 11, Salsay Weyane Tigray (Sawet) issued an official statement rejecting the council's return, characterizing the assembly as a "theatrical performance" disconnected from legality and morality. The party accused the TPLF of treating the historical suffering of Tigrayans as a political tool to retain a three-decade monopoly on power. Sawet demanded an immediate halt to the political gamble and called for the creation of an all-inclusive Interim Transitional Government representing alternative civil and political stakeholders.

=== Federal Government of Ethiopia ===
The federal government maintained strict recognition of Tadesse Worede's interim setup as the sole legitimate authority in Tigray. While Addis Ababa refrained from immediate ground force deployments to Mekelle, it implemented severe economic measures, freezing Tigray's federal budgetary allocations and tightening fuel corridors.

=== International Community ===
The escalating deadlock sparked international anxiety over a potential collapse of the 2022 peace framework. On April 30, 2026, the European Union issued a formal warning expressing "great concern" over the unilateral developments. The EU spokesperson demanded an "immediate de-escalation" of political tensions, warning that a return to armed conflict would have catastrophic humanitarian consequences for a population already suffering from widespread food insecurity and institutional collapse.

== See also ==
- Tigray People's Liberation Front
- Interim Regional Administration of Tigray
- Ethiopia–Tigray peace agreement
- Tigray War
- Debretsion Gebremichael
- Tadesse Werede
- Getachew Reda
- Politics of Ethiopia
