= Tigray political crisis =

Political turmoil in Ethiopia (2024–2025)

- Part of the Ethiopian civil conflict (2018–present) and the aftermath of the Tigray War
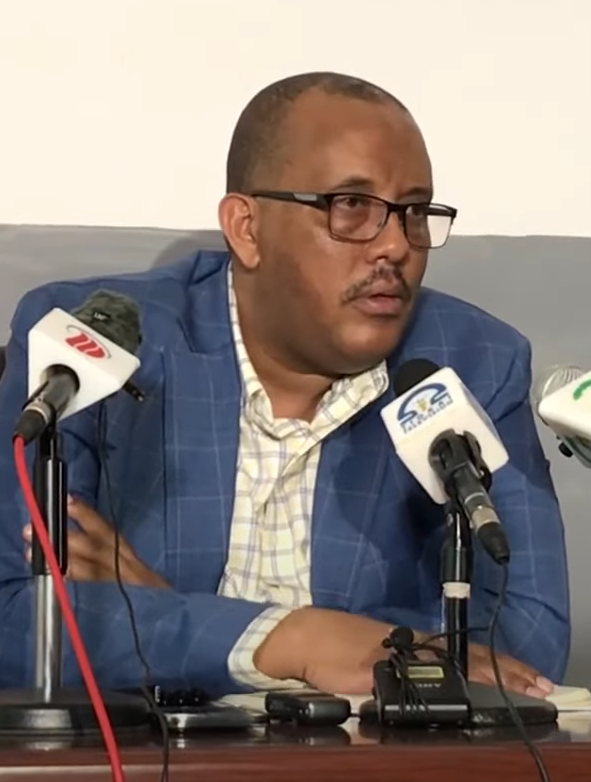
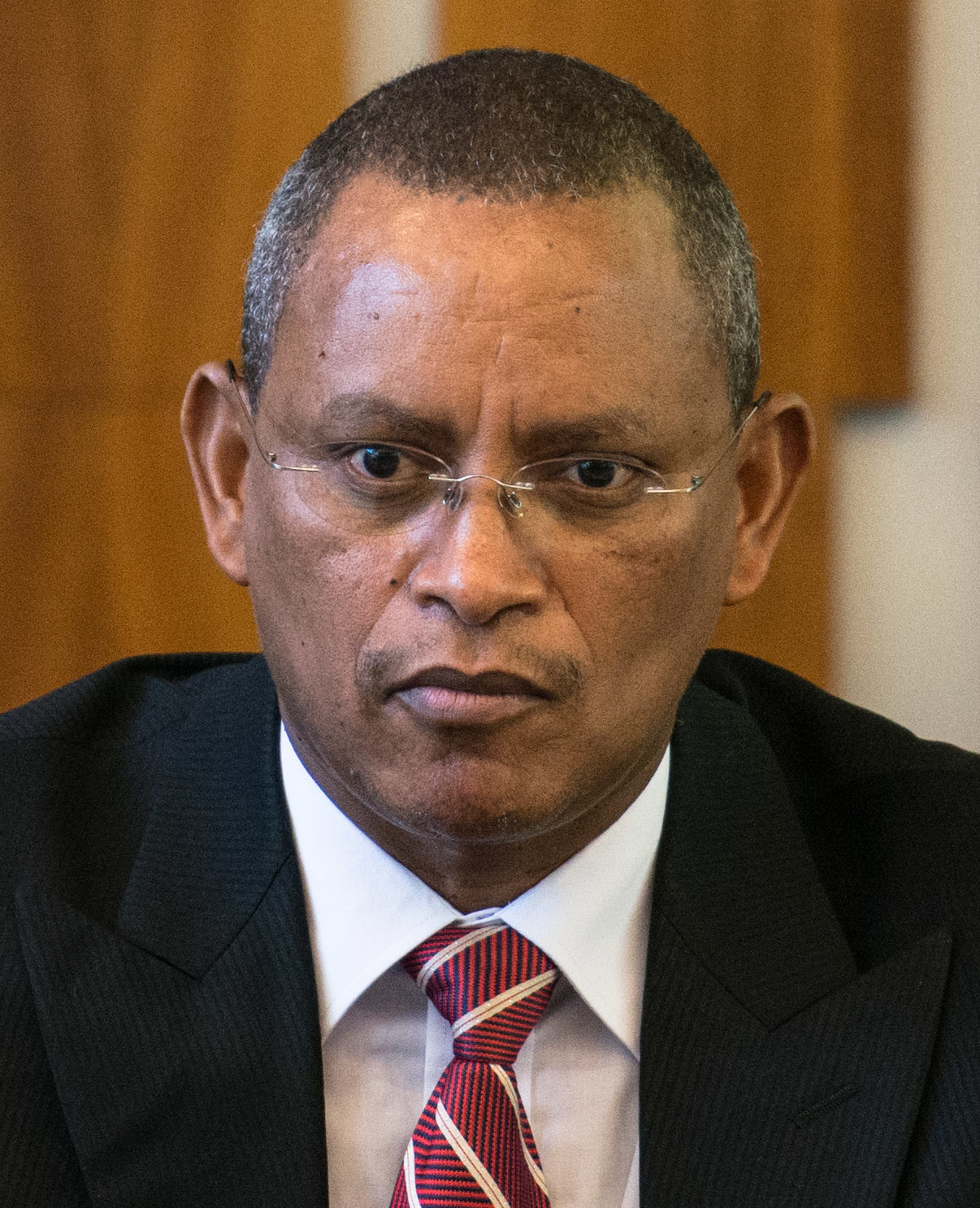
- Getachew Reda (left) and Debretsion Gebremichael (right)
- Date: 13 August 2024 – present
- Location: Tigray Region, Ethiopia
- Caused by: National Election Board of Ethiopia (NEBE) decision of not accepting TPLF as legal party in Ethiopia
- Status: Getachew aligned with the federal government, appointed as the Minister Advisor for East African Affairs on 11 April 2025.

Parties
TPLF: Tigray Defense Forces; Tigray Regional Council; Supported by Eritrea (accused)	Interim Regional Administration of Tigray: Tigray Peace and Change Council; Tigray Peace Force

Lead figures
Debretsion Gebremichael	Getachew Reda; Tadesse Werede

In August 2024, the Tigray People's Liberation Front (TPLF) internal administration was disputed between the chief administrator of the Interim Regional Administration of Tigray (IRAT) Getachew Reda and the chairman of TPLF Debretsion Gebremichael after the National Election Board of Ethiopia (NEBE) refused to accept the legal status of TPLF as a political party in Ethiopia. On 13 August 2024, the controversial 14th Congress of TPLF was held in Tigray's capital city Mekelle, drawing criticism from the public and NEBE for its irregularity and absence of TPLF officials in the conference. Getachew criticized the meeting for its informality and alleged the meeting designated to "oust certain leaders", and the minister of the Government Communication Service Legesse Tulu stated that holding the Congress "threatens the fragile peace that the people of Tigray have managed to achieve".

The division created fear in northern Ethiopia and escalated diplomatic tensions between Egypt, Somalia, Eritrea and Ethiopia. In April 2025, Getachew was appointed by Prime Minister Abiy Ahmed as the Minister Advisor for East African Affairs.

== Background ==
The Tigray People's Liberation Front (TPLF) internal division led by Getachew Reda led faction and TPLF chair Debretsion Gebremichael. On 18 September 2024, Getachew Reda accused TPLF members of alleging "coup against the interim Tigray Administration". After two years end conflict in the Tigray Region and Pretoria Agreement in 2022, the National Election Board of Ethiopia (NEBE) removed TPLF from terrorist database list. However, NEBE challenged TPLF status in fully-fledged political party in Ethiopia in August 2024. Debretsion denounced NEBE decision as "violation of the Pretoria Agreement". In 2023, Debretsion also filed complaint against NEBE decision to the African Union stating that the internal administration of TPLF should not be left to the Interim Administration.

== 2024 ==
The division is feared to heighten violence in northern Ethiopia and provide opportunities for Egypt, Somalia and Eritrea to exert diplomatic pressure on the Ethiopian government. On 13 August, the 14th Congress of TPLF was held in the Tigray's capital city Mekelle amidst leadership crisis and public outrage. Fourteen members of the Central Committee, including Getachew Reda, were absent from the congress. Attended by thousands of party members, the meeting took place in the Martyrs Monument Assembly Hall. Getachew, who initially decided to boycott the conference, criticized the meeting as being "hastily organized without reaching a consensus" by claiming it was designed to "oust certain leaders".

On 7 October, TPLF announced the removal of President Getachew Reda, and several other key officials from their positions. IRAT released a statement in which they called the removal a "public coup". On 17 November, there was a failed assassination attempt on Central Tigray administrator Solomon Measho. Measho is a high ranking member of the interim government and a supporter of Getachew's faction. While the culprit is unclear, many have blamed Debretsion's faction.

== 2025 ==
In late January 2025, Tigray politics plunged into a severe crisis as senior commanders of the Tigray armed forces loyal to Debretsion accused the Interim Administration, established under the Pretoria Treaty, of betrayal. They demanded its restructuring in line with the resolutions of the 14th party congress held in August 2024. The interim government labeled these actions a "coup d'état," while other Tigrayan political factions accused the commanders of risking the resurgence of war in Tigray.

On 11 April 2025, Getachew appointed by Prime Minister Abiy Ahmed as the Minister Advisor for East African Affairs, succeeded by General Tadesse Werede.
