= Next Tigray regional election =

- 2027

190 seats in the Council of Tigray Regional State Representatives

The next Tigrayan regional election is scheduled to be held by April 2027 by the National Election Board of Ethiopia with administrative support from the Interim Administration of Tigray.

== Background ==
The 2020 Tigray regional election was held by the Tigray People's Liberation Front (TPLF) against the wishes of the federal government of Ethiopia led by prime minister Abiy Ahmed, and was seen as one of the key events in the lead-up to the November 2020 to November 2022 Tigray war and genocide. During the 2026 Ethiopian offensive in late 2026, the Ethiopian National Defense Force (ENDF) and Tigray Peace Forces took control of Mekelle and other major Tigray towns, including Adigrat, from the TPLF. In early October 2026, the federal government declared a new Interim Administration of Tigray, with a key aim of holding Tigrayan elections within six months.

=== Local elections during October–November 2026 ===
During late October and through to 1 November 2026, woreda and city level elections had taken place in much of Southern Tigray, and in parts of Eastern Tigray, Central Tigray, and Northwestern Tigray. Redae Hailuom described the elections as a grassroots process that had been started prior to the interim administration taking power.

== Organisation of election ==
According to Getachew Reda, responsibility for organising the election would be held by the National Election Board of Ethiopia (NEBE). The Interim Administration of Tigray, established in October 2026 under Article 62(9) of the 1995 Constitution of Ethiopia, was expected to be a caretaker government that "would not undertake decisions with long-term strategic implications beyond routine governance and election preparations". Federal authorities stated that implementing conditions for a free and fair election was one of the main goals of the Interim Administration. Two members of the Interim Administration appointed on 16 October, Redae Hailuom Woldeselassie, chief executive for political affairs and public organization, and Shishay Amare, Mayor of Mekelle, are affiliated with the political party Tigray Democratic Solidarity (Simret).

The federal Ethiopian government expected the election to be held by April 2027.

== Results ==
Party
ADP
Arena
Baytona
SAWET
TDP or Simret
TIP
TPLF
Total

== See also ==
- Elections in Ethiopia
