= Tigray clashes (January–February 2026) =

2026 clashes in the Tigray Region of Ethiopia

2026 Tigray clashes
- Part of the Ethiopian civil conflict (2018–present) and the prelude to the 2026 Ethiopian offensive
Date	29 January 2026 – 1 February 2026 (3 days)
Location	Tigray Region, Ethiopia
Result	Status quo ante bellum; Both ENDF and TDF withdrew from the contested areas; Resumed fighting in September 2026

Belligerents
Ethiopia	Tigray Region

Commanders and leaders
(Ethiopia) Abiy Ahmed; (Ethiopia) Birhanu Jula	(Tigray People's Liberation Front) Debretsion Gebremichael

Units involved
Ethiopian National Defense Force; pro-government Amhara militias; Tigray Peace Force	Tigray People's Liberation Front; Tigray Defense Forces

Casualties and losses
- Per Tigray: 1 TDF soldier killed 1 TDF soldier injured

On 29 January 2026, clashes erupted in the Tigray Region of Ethiopia between the Tigray People's Liberation Front (TPLF) and Ethiopian government forces. On 1 February, the Tigray Defense Force (TDF) withdrew from Tselemti district as its commander Tadesse Werede demanded peaceful resolution and dialogue.

== Background ==
In November 2020, the TPLF and Tigray Defense Forces (TDF) launched attacks on Ethiopian Army bases in the Tigray region after tensions regarding the parliamentary elections to be held the next year, and over accusations of Ethiopian government corruption. This ultimately culminated into the subsequent Tigray War. By March 2022, the war had come to a virtual standstill and on 2 November 2022, the Pretoria Peace Agreement was signed, ending the Tigray War. Despite the agreement stipulating it, the TPLF/TDF did not demobilise, and still controlled much of the Tigray region. Alongside that, as of February 2026, much of Western remains occupied by Amhara militias who claim the territory.

In March 2025, tensions intensified again when a faction of the TPLF, led by Debretsion Gebremichael, took over several offices in Mekelle in a coup against the Interim Regional Administration of Tigray. Armed men belonging to the faction patrolled the streets of the city at night, checking people's identification. The Guardian reported that some accounts suggested that Eritrean intelligence had helped Debretsion's faction assume power, while Getachew Reda, the interim leader of Tigray, had fled to Addis Ababa.

These tensions continued in late 2025 when the TPLF accused the Ethiopian government of funding and aiding multiple anti-TPLF groups—particularly the Tigray Peace Forces (TPF), a splinter group of former TPLF/TDF members—active on Tigray's border with the neighboring Afar Region, which launched attacks on Tigrayan forces, killing several. Furthermore, in November, the Afar Regional government accused elements of the TPLF of crossing over the Tigray-Afar border and attacking civilians, and warned that it would retaliate if the TPLF did not withdraw. The TPLF denied the allegations, accusing Ethiopian-backed militants of orchestrating the attack. The day after, the TPLF accused Ethiopian forces of launching a drone strike on Raya Azebo, killing Tigrayan forces and civilians in violation of the Pretoria ceasefire.

== Clashes ==
On 29 January, these tensions erupted into clashes between Tigrayan fighters and Federal Forces (aided by Amharan militias) in Mai Degusha, a contested area of Tselemti district in western Tigray. Ethiopian Airlines cancelled its flights from Addis Ababa to cities in Tigray in response. Getachew Reda, former Tigrayan interim president deposed in the March 2025 coup, accused "Power-hungry individuals within the TPLF" of "trying to drag Tigray into another round of war."

On 30 January, Tigrayan forces captured the towns of Alamata and Korem in Southern Tigray after Ethiopian forces withdrew, leading to fears that clashes would spread to the region.

On 31 January, a Tigrayan official reported drone strikes that hit two Isuzu trucks near Enticho and Gendebta in Tigray, which were claimed to have been transporting weapons, killing one person and injuring another. The official accused the Ethiopian Armed Forces of the strikes without providing evidence.

On 1 February, Tigrayan forces withdrew from the Tselemti district after several days of intense clashes. Tadesse Werede described the withdrawal as a demonstration of their readiness for dialogue and a peaceful resolution to the current tensions.

On 3 February, Ethiopian Airlines reinstated air services to destinations in northern Tigray.

== Aftermath ==
On 1 August 2026, the TPLF reportedly clashed with the ENDF forces near the border of Sudan. On 20 August 2026, the TPLF launched drone strikes in the neighbourhood of Daero, Mekelle, wounding 13 civilians. On the same day, it hit Quiha, a town near Mekelle Airport, with drones. No casualties were reported following the attacks.

On 23 September 2026, the TPLF, as part of a rebel group alliance called the Ethiopian Peoples' Forces Coalition for Survival, launched an offensive against the Federal Government of Ethiopia.
