= Assefa Abraha Hagos =

Ethiopian engineer and government official

Assefa Abraha Hagos, also known as Assefa Abraha, is an Ethiopian engineer, businessman and government official. On 16 October 2026, the federal government appointed him chief executive for administration and public service in a new caretaker administration for the Tigray Region.

Assefa previously headed Ethiopia's Public Enterprises Supervising Authority and chaired the Ethiopian Privatization Agency. He was imprisoned between 2001 and 2008 following a split in the ruling party; the United States Department of State described him as a political prisoner. In 2022, he was a member of the Tigrayan delegation to peace negotiations in South Africa.

== Background and education ==
Assefa is a brother of Siye Abraha, a former Ethiopian defence minister. He studied mechanical engineering at Addis Ababa University. He subsequently graduated from the Harvard Kennedy School's Mid-Career Master in Public Administration programme in 2011.

== Government career ==
From 1994 to 2001, Assefa headed the Public Enterprises Supervising Authority in the Office of the Prime Minister. He held ministerial rank and also chaired the board of the Ethiopian Privatization Agency.

In a 1999 interview, Assefa described reforms under which state enterprises were reorganised as commercially operated businesses accountable to boards rather than directly to sector ministries. He said the privatisation programme had initially concentrated on retail outlets and smaller enterprises before moving towards larger businesses. He also described plans to sell company equity rather than individual assets, and argued that some enterprises should remain publicly owned until private-sector capacity and competition had developed sufficiently.

=== Arrest, conviction and release ===
Assefa was arrested with four of his siblings in May 2001 following a split within the ruling party. In October 2001, Sapa-AFP reported that he was among former officials and businessmen charged with corruption. Those charged included his brother Siye, whom the report identified as a political opponent of Prime Minister Meles Zenawi and a dissident within the Tigray People's Liberation Front.

In July 2007, Assefa was convicted of corruption and sentenced to nine years' imprisonment. He was released on parole on 31 July 2008, after more than seven years in detention. The United States Department of State's report on human rights in Ethiopia for 2008 classified him as a political prisoner.

== Business career ==
Assefa later worked with Welleba Business & Consultancy Services and Rahdan Engineering & Supply. Welleba was involved in the development and management of Raya Brewery, while Rahdan supplied industrial products and construction materials. He also served as chief executive of Kush & Key Consulting, which advised the government of South Sudan on policy.

== Peace negotiations and Tigray administration ==
In October 2022, Assefa was one of seven members of the Tigrayan delegation sent to African Union-mediated peace negotiations in South Africa during the Tigray War. Other delegates included Getachew Reda and Tsadkan Gebretensae. The talks began on 25 October and concluded with the Pretoria cessation-of-hostilities agreement on 2 November 2022.

On 16 October 2026, the federal government announced Assefa's appointment as chief executive for administration and public service in a new caretaker administration for Tigray. The administration was given a six-month mandate, with responsibilities including restoring essential services, facilitating the return of displaced people and preparing elections. According to the government's announcement, it would operate under federal direction and concentrate on day-to-day administration and election preparations rather than decisions with long-term strategic implications.
