= Siege of Tigray =

The siege of Tigray was part of the Tigray war and Tigray Genocide, the government-led siege on its people in northern Ethiopia's Tigray Region.

After Tigray Defense Forces (TDF) retook most parts of Tigray including the city of Mekelle on 28 June 2021, after eight months since the outbreak of the Tigray war in November 2020, the Government of Ethiopia began to siege all parts of Tigray under control of TDF.

== See also ==
- Tigray Genocide
- Timeline of the Tigray War
- War crimes in the Tigray War
- Casualties of the Tigray War
- Sexual violence in the Tigray War
- Ethiopia–Tigray peace agreement
- Tigray People's Liberation Front
