= Tigray Peace and Change Council =

Ethiopian coalition

The Tigray Peace and Change Council is a coalition of forces in the Tigray Region, created in May 2026, led by former head of the Interim Regional Administration of Tigray Getachew Reda aiming at removing the Tigray People's Liberation Front (TPLF) from power.

== Creation, aim and composition ==
The council was announced at a meeting in mid-May 2026. Attendees at the founding meeting included Getachew Reda and Tsadkan Gebretensae.

The aim was described as "creating an enabling, peaceful environment through an organized approach to remove the TPLF faction and, once removed, to bring sustainable peace and security to the region".

The council was stated to include Tigray Democratic Solidarity (Simret), National Congress of Great Tigray (Baytona), Arena Tigray For Democracy and Sovereignty (Arena Tigray), Tinsae 70 Enderta, Qanchi Haqi and the Tigray Peace Force. Tigray Independence Party denied joining the council.
