= Tigray Peace Force =

Rebel splinter group and political movement in the Tigray Region, Ethiopia

- ሓይሊ ሰላም ትግራይ
- Dates active: 2025–present
- Split from: (Tigray People's Liberation Front) Tigray Defense Forces
- Headquarters: Afar Region, Ethiopia
- Active regions: Afar Region, Tigray Region
- Ideology: Anti-TPLF
- Part of: Tigray Peace and Change Council

The Tigray Peace Force (TPF; Tigrinya: ሓይሊ ሰላም ትግራይ, romanized: Ḥayli Selam Təgray) is an armed group operating mainly in the Tigray Region of Ethiopia. It emerged as a rebel splinter group made up of former members of the Tigray Defense Forces (TDF) and the Tigray People's Liberation Front (TPLF), following internal divisions after the Pretoria Agreement, which ended the Tigray War in 2022. TPF has demanded reform, opposing the existing political order in Tigray, and the separation of party and state in post-war Tigray as central to its political outlook.

== Background and formation ==
TPF emerged after political fragmentation within Tigray following the signing of the Cessation of Hostilities Agreement (CoHA) in Pretoria in November 2022. During this period, a pronounced power struggle developed between two main factions within the TPLF:

- The Reform Faction: Associated with the former president of the Interim Regional Administration of Tigray (IRAT), Getachew Reda, who advocated democratic reforms, closer engagement with the Federal Government, and a separation between the party and the state.
- The Old Guard: Associated with TPLF Chairman Debretsion Gebremichael and senior military commanders, who sought to preserve the TPLF's established political influence and authority.

== Ideological stance and conflict ==
TPF primarily operates as an ideological resistance movement that challenges the political dominance of the pre-war elite, rather than seeking to replace the TDF as a conventional military force.

== Military and political clashes ==
The rivalry has periodically turned into armed clashes, particularly in southern Tigray near the border with the Afar Region, where the TPF is reported to have organized.

- Violent Engagements: Fighting between the TDF and TPF was reported from July 2025 in areas including Alasa in the Wajra zone. According to reports, the TDF used heavy weapons, including mortars and machine guns, against TPF fighters who entered Tigray from Afar.
- Accusations of Incursion: In a November 2025 letter to the international community, TPLF Chairman Debretsion Gebremichael claimed that TPF fighters had carried out incursions into southern Tigray, allegedly at the same time as a visit by the IRA president. The TPLF also accused the Federal Government of supporting the group and of carrying out drone strikes against targets in Tigray.
- Political Response: As tensions increased, figures such as Mulugeta Gebrehiwet (Chaltu) called on the commanders of both TDF and TPF to commit themselves to avoiding further conflict, warning that continued fighting could lead to a damaging internal war.

In December 2025, The Africa Report described TPF as a rebel group formed by former TDF members and mid-level TPLF commanders who were dissatisfied with the political settlement reached after the Pretoria Agreement, operating along the Tigray–Afar borderlands and carrying out armed operations that contributed to renewed insecurity in Afar and southern Tigray.

== See also ==
- Tigray Defense Forces
- Tigray People's Liberation Front
- Tigray War
- Tigray Genocide
- Tigray Interim Council
- Tigray Peace and Change Council
- Interim Regional Administration of Tigray
