= African Union–Ethiopia relations =

Bilateral relations

Ethiopia within the African Union

Ethiopia is one of founding African states of the Organization of African Unity (OAU) (now the African Union) on 25 May 1963 under Emperor Haile Selassie, headquartered in Addis Ababa. At the time the organization evolved up to 54 African states, except Morocco.

Ethiopia played strong stable power in the AU as a driving force of joint UN-AU peacekeeping mission in the regional affairs, particularly in the Horn of Africa. The AU as independent organ, allows Ethiopia to influence its policies, shape and impact continental policies that have bearings internally and regionally. Today, Ethiopian capital Addis Ababa is home of major organizations such as African Union, Pan African Chamber of Commerce and Industry, United Nations Economic Commission for Africa and African Standby Force.

== History ==
Members of the Organization of African Unity until 1990s

In 1961, the Africa Hall was officially inaugurated by Emperor Haile Selassie, designated by architect Arturo Mezzedimi. On 25 May 1963, Haile Selassie invited the heads of the 32 independent African states at the time to convene in Addis Ababa. The conference resulted formation of the Organization of African Unity (OAU), which evolved membership to 54 of 55 member state at the time. Morocco was the only state to decline membership. Haile Selassie delivered speech in the conference:

Only a few years ago, meetings to consider African problems were held outside Africa, and the fate of its peoples were decided by non-Africans. Today, … thanks to the conference of Accra and now of Addis Ababa, the peoples of Africa can, at long last, deliberate on their own problems and future.

In 1994, the OAU committed anti-apartheid measure against the white people in South Africa, who joined he organization in that year—the Pan-African Parliament alternatively has headquarter in Johannesburg and Midrand. Recognizing many shortcomings, the OAU in September 1999 issued the Sirte Declaration, calling for a new body to take its place. In 2000 and 2001, there was discussion regarding the headquarters of newly renamed African Union. On 9 July 2002, the proposal passed and resulted the creation of the African Union, which continue upholding the OAU policy to this date.

== Missions ==
Ethiopia occupies strategic missions as a host of the African Union, becoming great power on the continent. Its counterpart, the European Union, sees Ethiopia as a major ally in its attempt to keep African migrants from fleeing to Europe.

Several AU executive bodies, such as Pan-African Parliament, the African Peer Review Mechanism and the New Partnership for Africa's Development secretariat, are based in South Africa; while the African Court on Human and People's Rights based in Gambia; and the African Centre for the Study and Research on Terrorism based on Algiers, Ethiopia arguably maintain headquarter of the organization in Addis Ababa.

Apart from historical birthplace of OAU, Ethiopia also plays frontal role in military policy in the Horn of Africa and as a host to almost 850,000 refugees, mostly from South Sudan, Somalia, Sudan and Eritrea. Ethiopia also one of the largest contributor to UN and AU peacekeeping missions around the world, notably in Abyei (bordering Sudan and South Sudan), Darfur, South Sudan and Eritrea.

Ethiopia's policies in the Horn of Africa and to the matter in Africa are not constituting the policy of the AU as well as the AU does not readily aggregate the preference of each member states. Therefore, every AU norms, institution and overlaps as consensus stated in the AU Constitution Act and its various decision and policy making, and implementation organs. As such, the AU offers for member states like Ethiopia to influence and impact on policy internally and regionally.

The special responsibility of the organization worded in FANSPS, which states that "Ethiopia all along steadfastly championed the cause of Africa and Africans dating back to a time when it stood virtually alone." Accordingly, the Ethiopian government sometimes failed to support the Union and lacks self-conprehensive policy toward the AU that clearly articulates the national and regional interests in the AU. Despite failure of these criteria, Ethiopia's commitment, overall direction and contribution have been that of continuity and consistency.

During the 2014–2016 protests, the African Union Commission chief Moussa Faki Mahamat offered his services to he Government of Ethiopia during series political unrest. After resignation of Prime Minister Hailemariam Desalegn in February 2018, Mahamat told that his government sought to "address the challenge that necessarily arise in any endeavor to deepen democracy and advance development.

== Major organizations ==
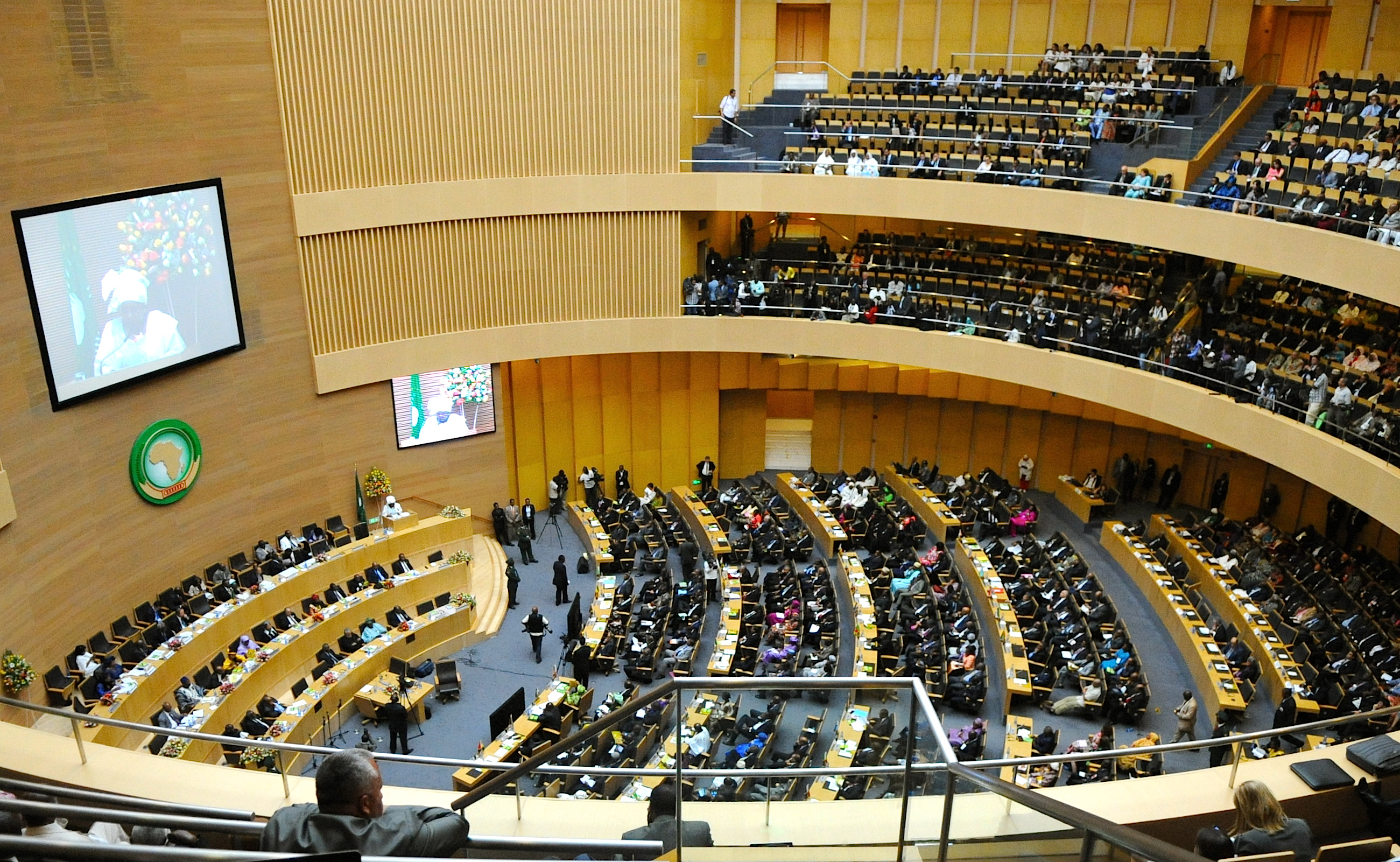
50th anniversary of African Union Summit at Africa Hall in Addis Ababa, 2013

- African Union
- Pan African Chamber of Commerce and Industry
- United Nations Economic Commission for Africa
- African Standby Force

== See also ==
- Foreign relations of Ethiopia
- Foreign relations of the African Union
