= Tigray Democratic Solidarity =

Political party in Ethiopia

Tigray Democratic Solidarity Tigrinya: ዲሞክራስያዊ ስምረት ትግራይ
- Abbreviation: Simret
- Leader: Getachew Reda
- Founded: 26 May 2025
- Split from: Tigray People's Liberation Front
- Membership: 5,600+
- Ideology: Liberalism
- Regional affiliation: Tigray Peace and Change Council

The Tigray Democratic Solidarity, commonly known as Simret ("Solidarity"), is a liberal political party in the Tigray Region of Ethiopia. The party received provisional registration from the National Election Board of Ethiopia on 26 May 2025. The party was formed after a split within the Tigray People's Liberation Front and is led by Getachew Reda.

== History and formation ==
The Tigray Democratic Solidarity (Simret) was granted provisional registration by the National Election Board of Ethiopia (NEBE) on 26 May 2025.

The party's formation follows a major internal rift within the long-dominant Tigray People's Liberation Front (TPLF) and the NEBE's subsequent revocation of the TPLF's legal status as a political party on 13 May 2025. Simret's leadership is drawn from a faction of former TPLF senior officials and allies who were expelled from the party in 2024 after a public split.

== Leadership and structure ==
On 24 October 2025, the party held its constituent assembly in Addis Ababa, attended by 256 members. The assembly formally elected the party's first leadership structure.

The elected leadership positions include:

- President: Getachew Reda
- First Vice President: Nega Assefa
- Vice President: Haftu Kiros
- Head of the Secretariat: Seble Assefa
- Chairman of the Control and Inspection Commission: Gebrehiwot Gebreselassie
- Deputy Chairman of the Control and Inspection Commission: Abrehaley Abera

In addition to the main posts, seven executive committee members and 31 council members were appointed. The party reported having over 5,600 registered members, though security concerns prevented many from attending the assembly.

== Ideology and political platform ==
Simret's stated ideology is liberalism. Its platform is centered on democratic principles, the rule of law, and civil political struggle.

=== Core policies and principles ===
- Anti-Oppression Stance: The party was established to "peacefully counter the oppression faced by the Tigray people" under the TPLF.
- TPLF Opposition: President Getachew Reda stated that the TPLF continues to undermine peace in the region and across the country by coordinating with external actors.
- Civil and Peaceful Struggle: Commitment to achieving political change through peaceful, civil, and democratic means, explicitly rejecting armed struggle or military affiliation.
- Self-Determination and Autonomy: Upholding the right to self-determination and constitutional autonomy for the people of Tigray.
- Inclusive Governance: Advocating for inclusive leadership, cooperation with other political parties, and rejecting the historical "one-party state" model in Tigray.
- National Prosperity: A representative of the federal Prosperity Party attended the inaugural assembly, stating that Simret would contribute to strengthening Ethiopia's capacity for sustainable development and future prosperity.

=== Political context ===
Due to its origins, the party is viewed by some analysts and opposition figures as a splinter group of the TPLF, while the leadership has sought to distance itself from the TPLF's historical vanguardist and military-political model. Simret has been accused by critics of being backed by the Ethiopian federal government to challenge TPLF dominance in Tigray, an accusation the party has denied, stressing its independence. Lt. Gen. Tsedkan Gebretnisae, a military figure at the assembly, praised the party's founding as a reflection of the Tigray people's commitment to peaceful, idea-driven political engagement, criticizing the TPLF for politically exploiting the population.
