= Tigray genocide =

Genocide against Tigrayans in Ethiopia from 2020 to 2022

Tigray Genocide
- Part of the Tigray war
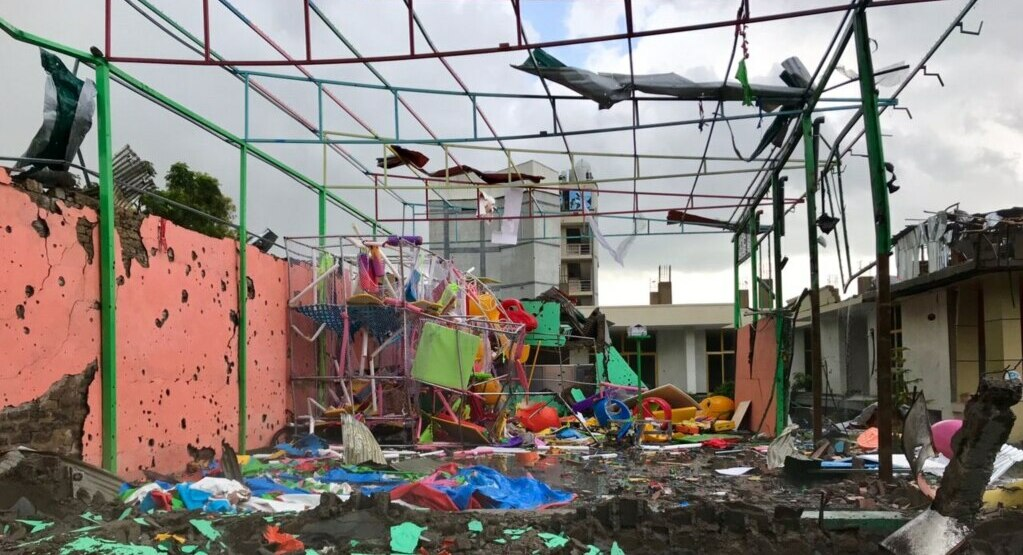
- Playground in Mekelle destroyed by an airstrike on 26 August 2022
- Location: Tigray region, Ethiopia
- Date: 2020–2022
- Target: Tigrayans, Kunama and Irob ethnic groups
- Attack type: Genocide, mass murder, wartime rape, summary execution, ethnic cleansing, mass shooting, blocking of humanitarian aid
- Deaths: 162,000–600,000 civilians (per Ghent University)
- Injuries: Unknown
- Victim: 120,000 women raped (per Tigrayan regional authorities)
- Motive: Ethnonationalism; Centralisation; Political repression; Territorial expansion
- Accused: Ethiopian Government Forces; Eritrean Government Forces; Amhara Special Forces; Afar Special Forces

The Tigray genocide is the genocide committed during the Tigray war in Ethiopia, which began in November 2020 and formally ended in November 2022 when the Pretoria Peace Agreement was agreed to. The conflict started when the regional government of Tigray sought greater autonomy, prompting a military intervention by the Ethiopian National Defense Force (ENDF) and its allies, including the Eritrean Defence Forces (EDF) and regional militias.

The Tigray war erupted in November 2020 following a dispute between the Ethiopian federal government and the Tigray People's Liberation Front (TPLF), the ruling party of the Tigray Region, over the region's autonomy. The conflict resulted in thousands of deaths and a humanitarian crisis.

== New Lines Institute Report ==
On June 4, 2024, the United States-based New Lines Institute released a comprehensive 120-page report concluding that there is strong evidence of genocidal acts committed by Ethiopian forces and their allies during the Tigray war. The report calls for Ethiopia to be prosecuted at the International Court of Justice (ICJ). Before the release of the New Lines Institute report, the Ethiopian and Eritrean governments were repeatedly accused of committing genocide in Tigray.

The New Lines Institute report provides evidence that Ethiopian and allied forces committed acts constituting genocide, which include:

- Killing Tigrayans: Systematic mass killings of Tigrayan civilians.
- Causing serious bodily or mental harm: Widespread incidents of torture, rape, and other forms of severe physical and psychological abuse.
- Deliberately inflicting conditions to destroy: Imposing starvation tactics and other measures aimed at destroying Tigrayan communities.
- Preventing births: Actions intended to prevent births within the Tigrayan population.
- Destruction and looting of heritage.

The report also highlights the role of social media in inciting violence, with certain individuals allegedly using online platforms to promote genocidal actions against Tigrayans.

== Designating genocide ==
The 1946 United Nations General Assembly (UNGA) declared the Genocide Convention, outlining the definition of genocide and listing associated crimes. Though the declaration defined genocide, it was other UN organs that interpreted the law, the final arbiter being the International Court of Justice (ICJ). The ICJ and other international tribunals, such as the International Criminal Court (ICC), have established the conditions that need to be fulfilled for a crime to be designated a genocide. Those conditions are broadly classified into three: targeting of a protected group, acts that target the group in whole or in part, and intent to destroy.

== Tigrayans as a protected group ==
The UN Genocide Convention stipulates that a targeted group can be defined based on ethnicity, nation, race, or religion. As such, Tigrayans are mainly categorized under ethnic or subnational grouping. Tigrayans have long played a key role in Ethiopian history, starting from the Axumite empire in the 1st–7th century which was situated in the current-day Tigrayan highlands and the city of Axum, the Battle of Adwa to defeat the Italian invasion in 1896, and the many rebellions of the 20th century against central Ethiopian governments. This long history has created a distinct ethnic identity with a unique language, Tigrinya, and culture.

== Genocide ==
=== Genocidal rape ===
The earliest reports on sexual- and gender-based violence emerged in March and April of 2021. One of those reports came from The New York Times after interviewing Mona Lisa, a survivor of an attempted assault. She detailed that after her resistance, the soldier shot her, leading to an amputated arm; similar testimonies started coming from other outlets as well. In addition, another report came from CNN, whose reporters interviewed victims who had fled to neighboring Sudan. The victims' testimonies indicated that sexual violence was used to "change the identity" of the women. In addition, UN Aid Chief Mark Lowcock stated that "sexual violence is being used as a weapon of war in Ethiopia's Tigray" and urged the UN to issue a statement. Abiy Ahmed's own cabinet member resigned her position as Minister of Women, Children, and Youth in protest of how the investigation into those crimes was handled; she claimed her report was blocked by the government.

Academic research also indicates the presence of genocidal rape. A 2023 study by Mengistu Welday Gebremichael of the College of Health Sciences at Mekelle University explored the impact of sexual violence on women and girls in the Tigray region. The authors highlight the long-lasting trauma, the challenges faced in escaping rape and killings, and the urgent need for coordinated efforts to heal, support, and rehabilitate survivors. A 2024 article published in the Journal of BRICS Studies provides a comprehensive analysis of the sexual violence perpetrated against Tigrayan civilians during the conflict. The authors detail the extent and nature of the abuse, presenting evidence suggesting an intent to sterilize and inflict maximum damage. By comparing the sexual violence in Tigray with similar cases from other conflicts, the authors conclude that it constitutes genocide.

=== Destruction of the healthcare system ===
Different studies indicate that Tigray's healthcare facilities were systematically and intentionally targeted, with close to 90% of the region's healthcare system being destroyed. A Médecins Sans Frontières report showed that less than 1 in 10 facilities were functioning, with 73% looted and 87% not fully or partially functioning. This destruction had a detrimental impact on the maternal mortality rate, which quadrupled from 186 per 100,000 in the pre-war period to 840 per 100,000 by May 2022.

=== Cultural genocide ===
Policies in the region have enforced the Amharic language on the indigenous Tigray population, a process which scholars Merih Welay Welesilassie and Berhane Gerencheal named "linguistic genocide" in a 2025 paper.

=== Airstrikes on civilians ===
A 2025 study found that of 1,143 airstrike casualties reported in Tigray over 17 months, nearly a third of the victims were children and half were women. The strikes occurred predominantly in civilian areas, such as internally displaced people's camps, marketplaces, churches, public transport, and children's playgrounds.

== International response ==
The New Lines Institute report urges the international community to exert diplomatic pressure on Ethiopia and to pursue legal action through the ICJ.

In 2024, the Australian Greens expressed deep concern over the humanitarian crisis in Tigray, citing the New Lines Institute genocide report. They believe the actions of Ethiopian and Eritrean forces may constitute genocide and urge the Australian government to support accountability.

== Ethiopian and Eritrean denials ==
Both the Ethiopian and Eritrean governments have consistently denied allegations of war crimes and genocide. Ethiopia has been accused of attempting to block international investigations, while Eritrea has labeled the accusations as defamatory.

== Notable statements and reactions ==
=== Norwegian Nobel Peace Prize Committee ===
The Nobel Peace Prize committee released a statement on January 13, 2022 condemning the restriction of aid to the population in need, and put the onus to end the conflict on the Ethiopian prime minister Abiy Ahmed Ali, stating, "Abiy Ahmed has a special responsibility to end the conflict and help to create peace." Abiy had received a Nobel Peace Prize in 2019 "for his efforts to achieve peace and international cooperation, and in particular for his decisive initiative to resolve the border conflict with neighbouring Eritrea".

=== Ethiopian Orthodox Christian Church ===
The sixth patriarch of the Ethiopian Orthodox Tewahedo Church, Abune Mathias, decried what is happening in Tigray as genocide and alleged his voice was being censored not to speak on the issue. The patriarch is an ethnic Tigrayan himself.

=== World Health Organization ===
World Health Organization Director General Dr. Tedros Adhanom Ghebreyesus, an Ethiopian citizen, stated in his remarks on October 19, 2022 that "There is a narrow window to prevent genocide in Tigray." Tedros criticized the Ethiopian government for its handling of the war and the use of siege tactics to prevent humanitarian aid from reaching its intended recipients.

=== United States ===
- Secretary of State Antony Blinken used the term "ethnic cleansing" for the first time in March 2021 to describe what was happening in western Tigray.
- Senate Foreign Relations Committee Chairman Senator Bob Menedez claimed in a letter to President Biden that Ethiopian officials have committed genocide in Tigray and asked the president to direct the Department of State to continue its work to determine the nature of the crimes committed.

=== United States Holocaust Memorial Museum ===
The Holocaust Memorial Museum issued statements in December 2021 and October 2022, warning of a heightened risk of genocide in Ethiopia. The museum cited vitriolic rhetoric against Tigrayans and the actions taken against the group.
