= Interim Regional Administration of Tigray =

Interim administration in Ethiopia from 2023

- ግዝያዊ ምምሕዳር ክልል ትግራይ

Overview
- Established: 23 March 2023
- Dissolved: 1 May 2026
- Polity: Tigray Region
- Leader: Chief Administrator
- Appointed by: Abiy Ahmed
- Responsible to: House of Federation

Two interim regional administrations of Tigray Region in Ethiopia were established in the 2020s. A first Interim Regional Administration of Tigray (Tigrinya: ግዝያዊ ምምሕዳር ክልል ትግራይ; Amharic: የትግራይ ክልል ግዝያዊ አስተዳደር) was announced by the Office of the Prime Minister of Ethiopia on 23 March 2023. This appointment was based on Article 10(1) of the Permanent Cessation of Hostilities Agreement (CoHA) signed in Pretoria between the Federal Government and the TPLF to end the conflict on 2 November 2022, which called for the establishment of an inclusive Interim Regional Administration, and a decision by the House of Federation (HoF) to establish the interim administration of the Tigray regional state, as per Article 62(9) of the 1995 Constitution of Ethiopia, proclamation 359/1995, article 14/2/B. On the same day, Getachew Reda was appointed as IRA head for undisclosed terms.

A second Interim Regional Administration of Tigray was established in October 2026, again under Article 62(9) of the Constitution. following the 2026 Ethiopian offensive.

== First interim administration (March 2023–May 2026) ==
=== Leadership ===
On 23 March 2023, following the November 2022 Ethiopia–Tigray peace agreement (Pretoria agreement) that established a ceasefire to end the Tigray war, the Ethiopian federal government nominated Getachew Reda as head of the first interim administration in Tigray Region.

In April 2025, Tadesse Werede, a military commander, took over the role of head of the administration. Debretsion Gebremichael and other TPLF members expressed their willingness to cooperate with the administration under Tadesse's leadership.

=== Interim Council ===
On 2 February 2025, the Tigray Interim Administration established the Tigray Interim Council to provide guidance and oversight. Moges Tafere was appointed chairperson, and Dejene Mezgebu (PhD), president of the Tigray Independence Party, was appointed deputy chairperson. The council comprises representatives from the administration, civil society organizations, political parties operating in the region, the Tigray diaspora, local experts, and security bodies.

=== Disestablishment ===
On 1 May 2026, the Central Committee of the Tigray People's Liberation Front restored the pre-war government and effectively dismantled the interim administration. On 5 May, Debretsion Gebremichael was elected as president by the TPLF and approved a new cabinet. This move was strongly condemned by Tadesse Werede, who claimed that it violated the Pretoria Agreement.

== Second interim administration (October 2026–present) ==
The October 2026 interim administration was established after the Ethiopian National Defense Force and Tigray Peace Force took control of Mekelle and other major Tigrayan towns during the 2026 Ethiopian offensive.

Five leaders of the October 2026 Interim Administration were appointed on 16 October:

- Asefa (or Assefa) Abraha Hagos, chief executive for administration and public services;
- Tewodros Aregay Woldeselassie, chief executive for the economy and reconstruction;
- Gebre Egziabher Beyene Hailu, chief executive for security and peace;
- Redae Hailuom (or Halefom) Woldeselassie, chief executive for political affairs and public organization;
- Shishay Amare, Mayor of Mekelle.

The administration was intended to act in a caretaker role, with a major aim being to enable a new Tigray regional election to be held by the National Election Board of Ethiopia by April 2027.

Redae and Shishay are affiliated with the political party Tigray Democratic Solidarity (Simret).

== See also ==
- Transitional Government of Tigray, the federally approved government located in Tigray from November 2020 to June 2021, prior to the March 2023 interim administration
