= Tigray People's Liberation Front =

Tigrayan nationalist political party in Ethiopia

Tigray People's Liberation Front ሕዝባዊ ወያነ ሓርነት ትግራይ
- Abbreviation: TPLF
- Chairman: Debretsion Gebremichael
- Deputy Chairman: Fetlework Gebregziabher
- Spokesman: Amanuel Assefa
- Founded: 18 February 1975; 51 years ago
- Headquarters: Mekelle (until Oct. 3, 2026)
- Newspaper: Weyin (ወይን)
- Paramilitary wing: Tigray Defense Forces
- Membership (1991): 100,000
- Ideology: Tigrayan nationalism; Revolutionary democracy; Marxism; Socialism; Ethnic federalism; Left-wing nationalism; Populism; Regionalism; Under Meles Zenawi: Third Way; 1975–1991: Communism; Marxism–Leninism; Hoxhaism; Tigrayan separatism (until late 1980s)
- Political position: Left-wing; 1975–1991: Far-left
- National affiliation: EPFCS; Formerly: EPRDF (1988–2019); CEFF (2019–2020); UFEFCF (2021–2022)
- Colors: Red; Gold
- House of Peoples' Representatives: 0 / 547 (0%)
- Council of Tigray Regional State' Representatives: 152 / 190 (80%)

Party flag

The Tigray People's Liberation Front (TPLF; Tigrinya: ሕዝባዊ ወያነ ሓርነት ትግራይ, romanized: Həzbawi Wäyyanä Ḥarənnät Təgray, lit. 'Popular Struggle for the Freedom of Tigray'), also referred as the Tigrayan People's Liberation Front, is a left-wing ethnic nationalist, paramilitary group, and a former ruling party of Ethiopia. It was classified as a terrorist organization by the Ethiopian government during the Tigray War until its removal from the list in 2023. The organization is colloquially known as Woyane (Tigrinya: ወያነ, lit. 'Revolutionary') or Weyané (Amharic: ወያኔ).

The TPLF was founded in February 1975, in Dedebit, Tigray. It grew to become the most powerful armed liberation movement in Ethiopia during the Ethiopian Civil War. Unlike the Eritrean or ethnic Somali separatists based in Ethiopia at the time, the TPLF did not seek independence from the Ethiopian state; instead, it aimed to overthrow the central government and implement its own version of the Ethiopian revolution. From 1988 to 2018, it led a political coalition, the Ethiopian People's Revolutionary Democratic Front (EPRDF). After fighting for over a decade, the TPLF, with the military support of the Eritrean People's Liberation Front (EPLF), overthrew the ruling People's Democratic Republic of Ethiopia (PDRE) on 28 May 1991, and installed a new government that remained in power for 27 years.

The new ruling EPRDF government, was dominated by the TPLF, who gradually consolidated control over Ethiopia's federal administrations, the ENDF, and key economic resources such as foreign aid, loans, and land leases, amassing billions. The TPLF's restructuring of Ethiopia into an ethnic federal state further fueled civil conflicts in the ensuing decades.

The TPLF lost control of the Ethiopian federal government in 2018. During the Tigray War that began in 2020, the National Election Board of Ethiopia terminated the party's legal status. In 2021, the Ethiopian parliament designated the TPLF as a terrorist organization. On 2 November 2022, the African Union brokered a deal in Pretoria, South Africa, between the federal government and the TPLF to end the Tigray War. As per the peace agreement, the TPLF began disarming in January 2023.

Following the Pretoria peace agreement in 2022, the TPLF began experiencing severe internal divisions. This has seen the rise of a hardline faction within the front. Fighting resumed in September 2026 when the TPLF initiated an offensive against the Ethiopian government.

== History ==
=== Origins ===
The TPLF is considered to be the product of the marginalization of Tigrayans within Ethiopia after Menelik II of Shewa became emperor in 1889, following the death of Yohannes IV at the Battle of Gallabat that same year. The Tigrayan traditional elite and peasantry had a strong regional identity and a resentment due to their own perception of the decline of Tigray. It was popularly referred to as Woyane, for evoking memories of the armed revolt of 1942–43 (the First Woyane) against the re-establishment of imperial rule after Italian occupation remained alive and provided an important reference for the new generations of educated Tigrayan nationalists.

At Haile Selassie I University (now Addis Ababa University), Tigrayan students had formed the Political Association of Tigrayans (PAT) in 1972 and the Tigrayan University Students' Association (TUSA) beginning in the early 1960s. These student groups evolved into a radical nationalist group that operated in Tigray after the start of the Ethiopian Revolution in 1974, and began calling for Tigrayan independence, forming the Tigray Liberation Front (TLF) by a seasoned school teacher Yohannes Teklehaymanot. Meanwhile, a Marxist current emerged in TUSA that advocated national self-determination for Tigray within a revolutionary, democratic Ethiopia.

While the multinational leftist movements prioritized class struggle over national self-determination for the Ethiopian nationalities, the Marxists of the TUSA argued for self-determination as the starting point for the final socialist revolution because of the existing inequalities among the Ethiopian nationalities.

=== 1974–1977 ===
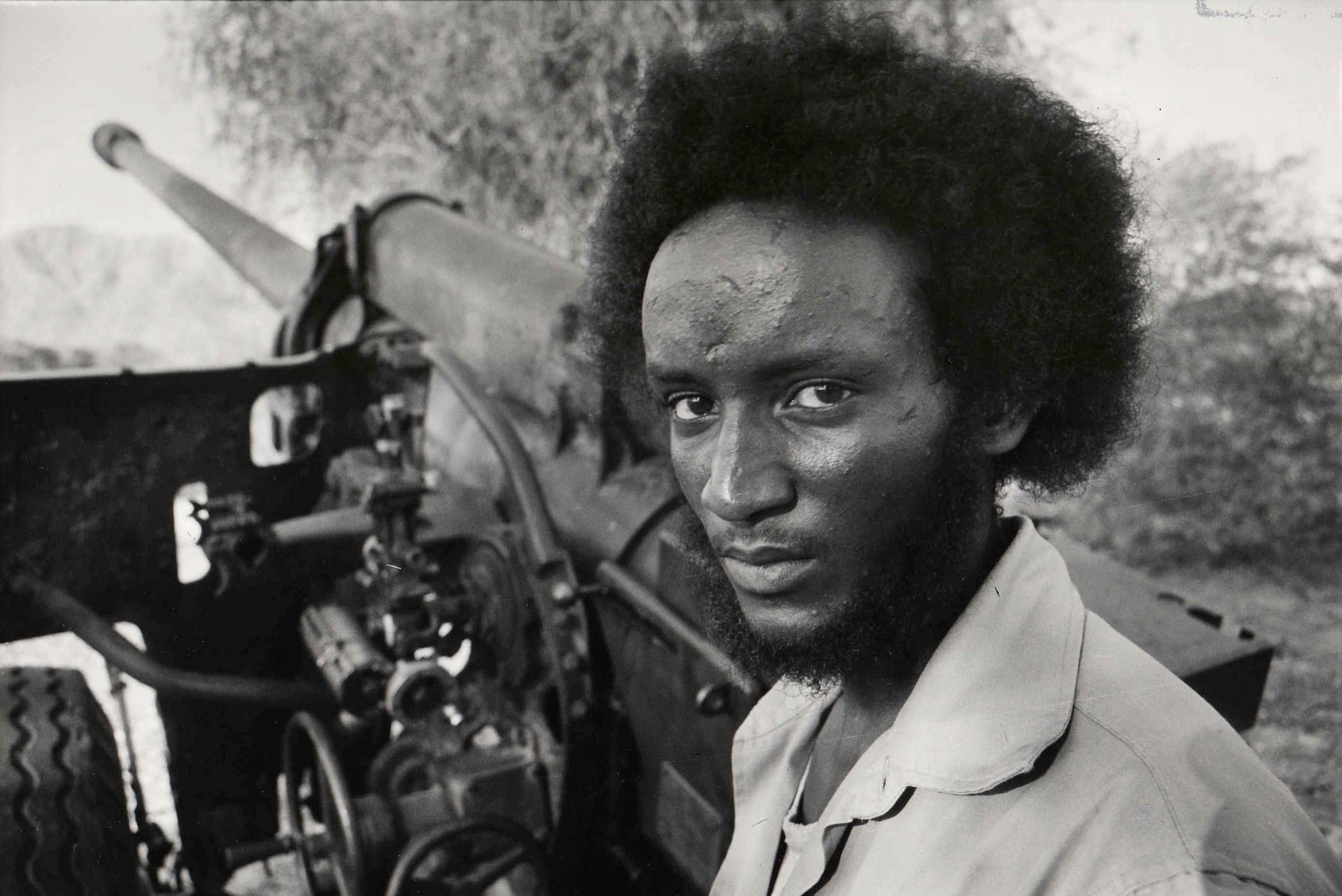
TPLF fighter with an M-46 howitzer during the Ethiopian Civil War.

In February 1974, the Marxists within TUSA welcomed the Ethiopian Revolution but opposed the Derg (a military junta that ruled Ethiopia from 1974 to 1991), as they were convinced that it would neither lead a genuine socialist revolution nor correctly resolve the Ethiopian nationality question.

Two days after the Derg took power, on 14 September 1974, seven leaders of this trend established the Association of Progressives of the Tigray Nation (Tigrinya: ማሕበር ገስገስቲ ብሔረ ትግራይ, romanized: Maḥbär Gäsgästi Bəḥer Təgray), more commonly known in foreign languages as the Tigrayan National Organization (TNO). The founders were: Alemseged Mengesha (nom de guerre: Haylu), Ammaha Tsehay (Abbay), Aregawi Berhe (Berhu), Embay Mesfin (Seyoum), Fentahun Zere'atsion (Gidey), Mulugeta Hagos (Asfeha), and Zeru Gesese (Agazi). The TNO was to prepare the ground for the future armed movement in Tigray.

It secretly approached both the Eritrean Liberation Front (ELF) and the Eritrean People's Liberation Front (EPLF) for support, but the ELF already had relations with the TLF. In November 1974, the EPLF agreed to train TNO members and allowed EPLF fighters from the Tigrayan community in Eritrea, including Mehari Tekle (Mussie), to join the TPLF. The first group of trainees was sent to the EPLF in January 1975.

On the night of 18 February 1975, eleven men, including Gesese Ayyele (Sehul), Gidey, Asfeha, Seyoum, Agazi, and Berhu, left Enda Selassie for Sehul's home area of Dedebit, where they founded the TPLF (original name Tigrinya: ተጋድሎ ሓርነት ሕዝቢ ትግራይ, romanized: Tägadlo Ḥarənnät Ḥəzbi Təgray, lit. 'Tigray People's Liberation Struggle'). Welde Selassie Nega (Sebhat), Legese Zenawi (Meles), and others soon joined the original group, and, after the arrival of the trainees from Eritrea in June 1975, the TPLF had about 50 fighters. It then elected a formal leadership consisting of Sehul (the chairman), Muse (the military commander), and the seven TNO founders. Berhu was appointed political commissar. Sehul played a crucial role in helping the nascent TPLF establish itself among the local peasantry.

The TPLF embraced a Marxist vision focused on 'radical decentralization' of the Ethiopian state. In contrast to the Eritrean and Somali liberation movements, the TPLF sought not independence, but the overthrow of the central government to establish its own revolutionary framework for Ethiopia.

Although a few successful raids bolstered its military credibility, the TPLF grew to only about 120 fighters in early 1976, but a rapidly growing clandestine network of supporters in the cities and a support base among the peasants provided vital supplies and information. On February 18, 1976, a "Fighters' Conference" elected a new leadership: Berhu (chairman), Muse (military committee), Abbay (political committee), Agazi (socioeconomic committee), Seyoum (foreign relations), Gidey, and Sebhat. Meles became head of the political cadre school.

The first three years of its existence were marked by a constant struggle for survival, unstable cooperation with Eritrean forces, and power struggles against the other Tigrayan fronts: in 1975, the TPLF liquidated the TLF; in 1976–78, it fought the Ethiopian Democratic Union (EDU) in Shire; and in 1978, the Ethiopian People's Revolutionary Party (EPRP) in East Tigray. The front also suffered heavy losses from Derg offensives in the region.

Although the TPLF, the ELF, and the EPLF cooperated during the 1976 and 1978 Derg offensives in Tigray and Eritrea, no stable alliance emerged. The ELF resented the liquidation of the TLF and considered the relationship between the EPLF and the TPLF a serious threat. Since 1977, there had been conflict between ELF and the TPLF over the issue of Eritrean settlers in western Tigray, who were organized at ELF and rejected the TPLF's land reform. Relations with the EPLF also did not develop smoothly. Its material support was much less than the TPLF had anticipated. Politically, the EPLF favored the multinational EPRP over the ethno regionalist TPLF with its separatist agenda at the time.

=== 1978–1990 ===
Following the Derg's victory in the Ogaden War in February 1978 and Mengistu Haile Mariam's new support from the Soviets (and much of the Eastern-bloc) caused the substantial growth and augmentation of the Ethiopian military, the TPLF's momentum seemed to slow. During the TPLFs early years, the Derg was primarily focused on the Eritrean and Somali insurgencies, allowing it to avoid the full force of the Ethiopian military as its numbers grew to 20,000 strong.

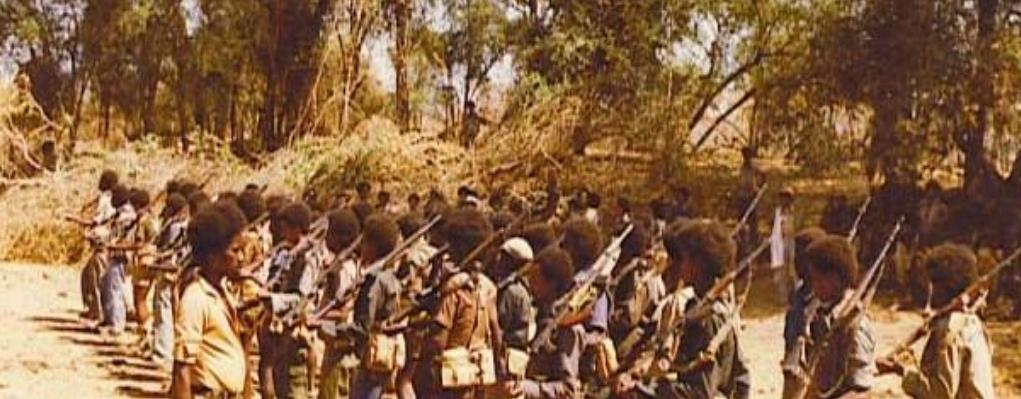
TPLF militants training

On February 26-March 3, 1979, the TPLF held its First Organisational Congress. It declared its struggle the Second Woyane (kalay wäyyanä) and changed its Tigrinya name to Həzbawi Wäyyanä Harənnät Təgray ("Popular Struggle for the Freedom of Tigray"). It adopted a new political program calling for self-determination within a democratic Ethiopia, with independence an option only if unity proved impossible. Gaining and maintaining the support of the local population was at the core of the TPLF's strategy in the 1970s and 1980s. TPLF leaders knew that the goodwill of the population would sustain their movement and ultimately lead them to victory over the Derg. Consequently, any fighter caught mistreating locals was punished or even executed by TPLF authorities. As a result, local support for the TPLF was consistent and invaluable. The local population shared food and resources with the fighters, provided them with safe havens, and, most importantly, provided the TPLF with up-to-date information.

In retrospect, it is evident that the 1978-1985 period further strengthened the TPLF. The increasingly alienating intervention of the Derg, the front's handling of famine and refugee problems, and the foreign connections it built through its mission in Khartoum, enabled the movement to mobilize and better equip more fighters to prepare for the shift from asymmetrical to semi-conventional warfare. Moreover, developments within the TPLF in the mid-1980s led to a conceptual shift from a struggle for the liberation of Tigray to that of all Ethiopia.

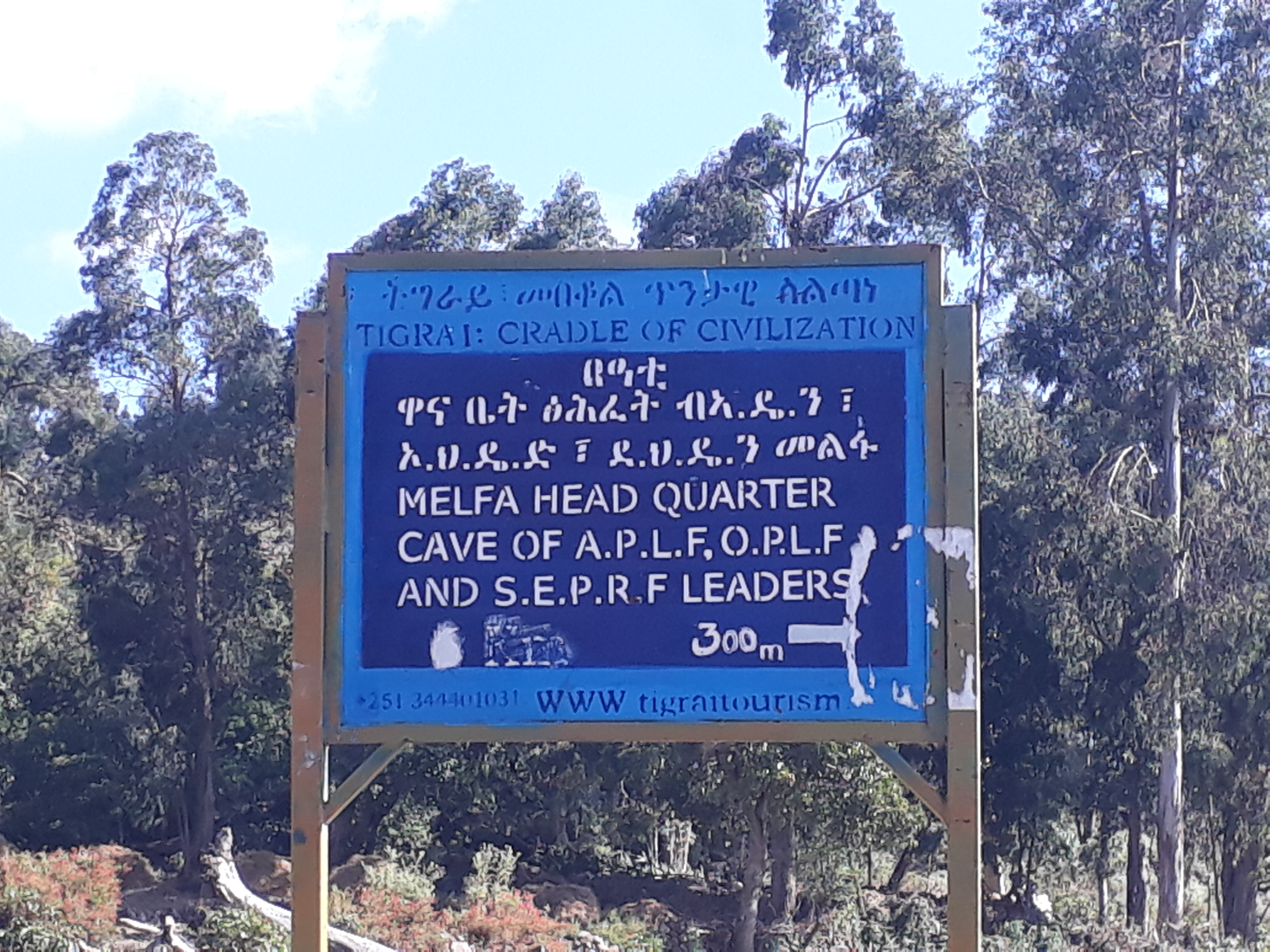
A signboard for the EPDM/ANLF headquarters in Melfa (Dogu'a Tembien) during the Ethiopian Civil War.

They established their headquarters in caves in Addi Geza'iti, some 50 kilometers west of Mekelle. The Ethiopian People's Democratic Movement (EPDM), a EPRP-splinter group loyal to the TPLF, utilized TPLF subterranean bases in Melfa (Dogu'a Tembien).

On May 10–16, 1983, TPLF held its Second Organisational Congress. In this congress, TPLF declared its struggle being against imperialism (in general, US and Soviet ones in particular), feudalism, and bureaucratic capitalism (which was evolving into state capitalism) and reassured its position for the necessity for a united front. In this congress, Marxist–Leninist leaders of the TPLF made it possible for a resolution about allowing its communist members in a "higher level of organising" to pass, which laid the foundations for the Organization of Vanguard Elements, also (publicly) called as the Marxist–Leninist Core of the Tigray People's Liberation Front, a pre-party group.

The TPLF managed to use the catastrophic famine of 1983-85 to its advantage. In early 1985, it organized a march of over 200,000 famine victims from Tigray to Sudan to draw international attention to the plight in Tigray. Its humanitarian arm, the Relief Society of Tigray (REST), founded in 1978, received large amounts of international humanitarian aid for famine victims and small-scale development projects in the liberated areas of Tigray. In 1984–1985, the TPLF diverted Western aid money intended for starving civilians to purchase weapons.

A power struggle in the leadership saw future Ethiopian Prime Minister Meles Zenawi rise to power during 1985. In July 1985, the Marxist–Leninist League of Tigray (MLLT) was founded at a congress of a few hundred selected cadres. The MLLT was to be the nucleus of the future Marxist–Leninist vanguard party for all Ethiopia. The MLLT invited the genuine revolutionaries in the ranks of the Derg regime, which was busy organizing its own communist party, the Ethiopian Workers' Party, to join it.

In December 1988, the TPLF and EPDM formed the Ethiopian People's Revolutionary Democratic Front (EPRDF) as the core of the planned United Democratic Front. In the spring of 1989, first the MLLT and then the TPLF held a congress. Abbay was elected chairman of both organizations, but toward the end of 1989 Meles became chairman of both.

On May 27-June 1, 1989, Marxist–Leninist core within the EPDM held its congress, founding the Ethiopian Marxist–Leninist Force (EMLF). Like the MLLT in TPLF, the EMLF was planned as a leading force of the "people's democratic movement" (that's the EPDM) and a subject of future all-Ethiopia Marxist–Leninist party. After the EMLF, the EPDM also held its Second Organizational Congress on June 17–21, 1989. In July 1989, MLLT and EMLF formed the Union of Ethiopian Proletarian Organizations. (Note: Sometimes translated with different names, such as "Ethiopian Proletarian Organisation", "Ethiopian Proletarian Organisations", "Ethiopian Proletarian Organisations Unity", etc.)

In April 1990, the TPLF formed the Ethiopian Democratic Officers Movement from politically re-educated captured Ethiopian officers to undermine the Free Officers Movement, which had been formed in 1987 by exiled Ethiopian officers in opposition to the Derg. In May 1990, Oromo members of the EPDM and politically re-educated Oromo prisoners of war founded the Oromo Peoples' Democratic Organization (OPDO) to deny the Oromo Liberation Front's claim to be the exclusive representative of the Ethiopian Oromo. In November 1990, a Marxist–Leninist Oromo movement was established within the OPDO. Also in 1990, the TPLF formed the Afar Democratic Union to undermine the Afar movements. It had already helped build liberation fronts in Gambella and Benshangul before 1985.

In early 1988, the EPLF and the TPLF went on the offensive. The evolving situation in both Eritrea and Tigray, as well as the changing international context after the breakup of the Soviet bloc, prompted the TPLF and EPLF to put aside their differences and resume military cooperation. in 1989, the EPRDF formed a shadow government in Ethiopia to administer the liberated areas under its control.

=== 1991–2018 ===
In February 1991, the EPRDF began its offensive against the ruling regime with the support of a large EPLF contingent. On May 28, 1991, the EPRDF captured Addis Ababa, the capital of Ethiopia, and took control of the country. In July 1991, the EPRDF established the Transitional Government of Ethiopia. In May 1991, the TPLF had 80,000 fighters, the EPDM had 8,000, and the OPDO had 2,000. The total number of TPLF members was well over 100,000.

Reacting to the international political context after the demise of communism, the EPRDF and TPLF dropped all Marxist references in their political discourse and adopted a program of change based on multi-party politics, constitutional democracy, ethno-linguistic federalization, and a mixed economy. The TPLF restructured the Ethiopian state and introduced ethnic federalism, which has contributed significantly to civil conflicts in Ethiopia over the following decades.

Under the Ethiopian People's Revolutionary Democratic Front (EPRDF), the nation was governed by TPLF leader Meles Zenawi who became the first prime minister. The EPRDF government, particularly in areas concerning the military-security complex and the economy, was dominated by the TPLF. Gradually the TPLF hegemony within the EPRDF grew stronger as the party dominated Ethiopia's federal administrations and the Ethiopian National Defence Force (ENDF) officer corps. The party exercised, "near-exclusive control over foreign aid, international loans, and the leasing of public land to amass billions of dollars." With the EPRDF effectively under TPLF control, the Tigrayan position in Ethiopian governance post-1991 mirrored the political dominance that the Amharas had held in the country during most of the 20th century.

PM Meles Zenawi purged many members of the TPLF who opposed him, and a 2001 split in the party nearly saw his removal. Following Zenawi's death in 2012, the organization quickly splintered into factions of Meles loyalists, young technocrats in Addis and party officials in Mekelle. These factions took a wide range of positions on core issues, paralyzing the TPLF. Zenawi's handpicked successor, Halemariam Desalegn, proved too weak to manage growing internal strife in Ethiopia.

Over the years the TPLF's position in the EPRDF weakened as Amhara and Oromo parties pushed backed against Tigrayan dominance. After 30 years of TPLF-based authoritarian rule, strong popular opposition to the dominance of the party emerged across the country during 2016. Amhara and Oromo elites came to an agreement to reform the TPLF created system, resulting in the accession of Abiy Ahmed to Prime Minister of Ethiopia in the following years. Internal power struggles within the EPRDF and its inability to quell popular protests resulted in a major political transition and Abiy Ahmed's election in 2018.

=== 2018–2020 ===
During 2018, newly elected prime minister Abiy began curtailing the influence and position of the TPLF within Ethiopian politics. In June of that year he unexpectedly sacked the two most powerful TPLF members since Zenawi's death - Samora Yunis (army chief of staff) and Getachew Assef (intelligence chief). The party felt threatened as Abiy carried out significant reforms that aimed to merge Ethiopia's ethnic parties and reduce the TPLF's influence.

In November 2019, PM Abiy and the chairman of the EPRDF unified the constituent parties of the coalition into the new Prosperity Party. The TPLF viewed this merger as illegal and did not participate. Abiy called on the TPLF to dissolve and become part of his newly established Prosperity Party. Many TPLF leaders began shifting from the nation's capital of Addis Ababa to the Tigray regional state capital of Mekelle. In this period the organization recruited a substantial amount of fighters from different groups such as the police and paramilitary organizations, while also withdrawing its supporters from the Ethiopian national security establishment. This precipitated the Tigray War in late 2020. As TPLF leaders and parliament members began shifting back to Mekelle, the organization began to challenge the administration of Abiy Ahmed.

In June 2020, the Ethiopian parliament—to which the TPLF was a party—voted to postpone the 2021 Ethiopian General Election, which was originally scheduled to occur in 2020. The TPLF defied the parliamentary vote and held regional elections anyway. The 2020 Tigray regional election was held on 9 September 2020. 2.7 million people participated in the election, though was it was boycotted by Arena Tigray and the Tigray Democratic Party. PM Abiy stated that the federal government would not recognize the results of the Tigray election and banned foreign journalists from traveling to the region document it.

=== 2020–2022 ===
In November 2020, a civil conflict erupted between the TPLF and the Ethiopian National Defense Force (ENDF) when the TPLF attacked the ENDF Northern Command headquarters in the north of the country in what TPLF spokesman Getachew Reda described as a "preemptive strike". In November 2020, Prime Minister Abiy Ahmed declared victory over the TPLF. Other sources suggested that the Ethiopian National Defense Force (ENDF) controlled only about 70% of the Tigray region. Many TPLF members joined the Tigray Defense Forces (TDF). The TPLF has accused the ENDF and Eritrean forces of war crimes, but it is difficult to independently verify these allegations because of the media blackout imposed by the federal government under Abiy. On March 23, 2021, in response to international pressure, the prime minister admitted for the first time that Eritrean forces had been in the Tigray region. In July 2021, after the Ethiopian government declared a unilateral cease-fire and withdrew from much of the Tigray region, the TDF entered neighboring Afar and Amhara regions. The ENDF then launched its own counteroffensive and recaptured these regions by December 2021. By March 2022, the war had come to a virtual standstill. On 2 November 2022, the Pretoria Peace Agreement was signed, ending the Tigray War.

On June 4, 2024, the United States-based New Lines Institute released a comprehensive 120-page report concluding that there is strong evidence of genocidal acts committed by Ethiopian forces and their allies during the Tigray war. The report calls for Ethiopia to be prosecuted at the International Court of Justice (ICJ). Before the release of the New Lines Institute report, the Ethiopian and Eritrean governments were repeatedly accused of committing genocide in Tigray.

The TPLF was accused of forcing recruitment into the TDF, including minors. According to several witnesses and Tigrayan administrators, every household in Tigray was required to enlist a family member in the TDF. Those who refused were arrested and imprisoned, including the parents of minors who refused to enlist.

=== 2022–2024: Post-Tigray War ===
After the Tigray War significantly reshaped the region's political landscape, the TPLF faced deepening divisions following the signing of the Pretoria Agreement. These divisions emerged between two factions: a 'hardline' group led by TPLF chairman Debretsion Gebremichael and a 'conciliatory' group led by deputy chairperson Getachew Reda. The power struggle between the Debretsion and Getachew has raised concerns of the creation of a volatile political environment that could reignite the civil war. The TPLF also suffers a crisis of legitimacy among the Tigrayan population following the war. In July 2024, the TPLF released a statement announcing it faced an unprecedented 'severe test' that has brought the party to the verge of disintegration. The statement accused senior leaders of putting their personal interests above the party, thus threatening its existence.

During August 2024, the National Election Board of Ethiopia (NEBE) rejected the TPLF's request to reinstate its pre-war legal status. On 12 August, chairman Debretsion declared that NEBE's decision undermined the TPLF's 50-year legacy and violated the Pretoria deal which had ended the Tigray War during November 2022. Following the decision, the federal government announced that the issue of TPLF registration and legality had been resolved. NEBE also warned against the convening a congress without the election boards approval or monitoring.

==== 14th party congress and growing internal split ====
On 13 August 2024, the TPLF began its controversial 14th party congress in Mekelle, ignoring the NEBE's warning. The last congress had been held in September 2018. 14 members of the party's central committee, including deputy chair Getachew, boycotted the congress. Getachew described it as, "illegal movements by a group that does not represent the TPLF" several days before it was due to be held. Ethiopian PM Abiy Ahmed warned that the TPLF could find itself in a war if it went ahead with holding the congress. As the six day long meeting commenced on 13 August, an Ethiopian government minister accused the TPLF of "practically nullifying" the Pretoria agreement and threatening the peace. Debretsion stated that the congress was unprecedented and warned those gathered that the party's situation had "gone from bad to worse".

Since the 14th party congress, factionalism within the TPLF escalated as both sides became more entrenched in their positions. Debretsion effectively has popular support and power over the TPLF party apparatus, while Getachew maintains authority over Tigray's interim regional government and is being backed by the Ethiopian federal government. There is a growing risk the internal split will escalate into the outbreak of violence as it becomes more intractable. In the period following, Debretsion's faction removed Getachew and several other officials from their roles in the administration, claiming they "no longer have the authority to lead, make decisions, or issue directives." In response, the interim administration has accused Debretsion's group of attempting to destabilize Tigray through a coup d'état. Getachews administration has warned that it would pursue legal action against Debretsion's faction for allegedly sowing "chaos and anarchy".

On 10 November 2024, Getachew released a statement declaring that Debretsion Gebremichael's TPLF was plotting an 'official coup' against the interim regional government. He claimed that this faction within the TPLF has escalated from merely obstructing his government to actively plotting to overthrow it.

=== 2025–2026: Return to regional power and internal leadership ===
In March 2025, The Guardian reported that a faction of the TPLF, led by Debretsion, took over several offices in Mekelle. In what it called a coup, it reported that armed men belonging to the faction patrolled the streets of the city at night, checking people's identification. The Guardian also said that there are some reports suggesting that Eritrean intelligence helped Debretsion's faction assume power. Meanwhile, it reported that Getachew Reda, the interim leader of Tigray, had fled to Addis Ababa.

The power shift marked the return of a hardline faction within the TPLF, supported by the Tigray Defense Forces (TDF), which accused the previous leadership of failing to secure core Tigrayan interests, particularly the return of disputed territories and resettlement of displaced persons. The TPLF nominated TDF commander Tadesse Werede as interim president, triggering a dispute with Prime Minister Abiy Ahmed, who claimed sole authority to appoint a replacement. The faction is led by four influential party veterans—Debretsion Gebremichael, Fetlework "Monjorino" Gebregziabher, Alem Gebrewahid, and former intelligence chief Getachew Assefa—who have reemerged as dominant figures in Tigrayan politics. Some critics have expressed concern that the group's confrontational stance toward Addis Ababa could jeopardize the fragile peace established by the 2022 Pretoria Agreement. TPLF leaders have vowed to pursue a tougher negotiating position with the federal government, particularly on the issue of Western Tigray, though some analysts caution this may risk renewed conflict.

After the 2025 Tigrayan coup, the TPLF accused the Ethiopian government of funding and aiding in multiple anti-TPLF groups active on the Tigray-Afar border, including the Tigray Peace Forces, Hara Meret, and Getachew Reda's newly founded Simret Party. These anti-TPLF groups have launched attacks on Tigray forces, killing several.

On 5 November 2025, the Afar Regional government accused elements of the TPLF of crossing over the Tigray-Afar border and attacking Afar pastoralists in Megale (woreda). It further stated that the regional government would retaliate if the TPLF did not withdraw from the 6 villages it occupied. The TPLF denied the allegations, accusing the Tigray Peace Forces (TPF) —an anti-TPLF militia purportedly funded by the Ethiopian government and active on the Tigray-Afar border— of orchestrating the attack. The day after, the TPLF accused Ethiopian forces of launching a drone strike on Raya Azebo, killing Tigrayan forces and civilians in violation of the Pretoria ceasefire.

On 29 January 2026, clashes broke out in Tselemti woreda between Tigray and government forces (aided by Amharan militas), in a region disputed between Tigray and Amhara. In response, Ethiopian Airlines suspended all flights within Tigrayan airports. The clashes intensified fears of renewed conflict and humanitarian issues in Tigray.

During early May 2026 the TPLF replaced the interim post-Tigray War administration in Mekelle. This has significantly heightened tensions with the Ethiopian federal government, as the TPLF's attempt to reassert control over Tigray is being seen as a direct challenge to Abiy Ahmed's rule in Addis Ababa.

In June 2026, the TPLF issued a proclamation of a draft law that would grant it powers to compel military service and punish dissent with 25-year prison sentences.

Clashes occurred between TPLF and Ethiopia, when Tigrayan forces invaded Ethiopian territory from Sudan in the Battle of Shererina in July 31-August 1, 2026. The clashes de-escalated after hundreds of refugees fled the border.

Territorial control as of November 2025. (Note: Other maps of territorial control in this war are presented by MapEthiopia) (For a more detailed, up-to-date, interactive map, see here). Pro-federal government troops Ethiopian federal government and regional allies Anti-federal government rebels Controlled by the Tigray People's Liberation Front Oromo Liberation Army Fano

== Election results ==
Elections from 1995 to 2015 were conducted under the Ethiopian People's Revolutionary Democratic Front banner.

Election	Leader	No. of Votes	No. of seats won	Government/Opposition
1995 Tigray regional election	Meles Zenawi			Government
2000 Tigray regional election	Meles Zenawi		152 / 152	Government
2005 Tigray regional election	Meles Zenawi		152 / 152	Government
2010 Tigray regional election	Meles Zenawi		152 / 152	Government
2015 Tigray regional election	Abay Weldu	2,374,574	152 / 152	Government
2020 Tigray regional election	Debretsion Gebremichael	2,590,620	152 / 190	Government

== Ideology ==
The party has its roots in the 1960s student movement which was ideologically nationalist before shifting towards Marxism–Leninism in late 1960s. After revolutionary students formed the Tigray University Student Association, a new leftwing organization known as the Tigrayan National Organization was founded in 1974, from which the TPLF emerged in February 1975. The core ideology of the party was ethnonationalism infused with the theme of a class-based - ethnonationalism is the fundamental foundation of the party and it persisted throughout the entire existence of the TPLF. The TPLF argues that Ethiopia is a collection of nationalities subjugated by the Amhara ethnic group, which imposes its culture and language over all others; the first manifesto of the party stated: "Disagreement and suspicion among the nations of Ethiopia have resulted from the worsening of the oppression by the Amhara ethnic group over the oppressed nations of Ethiopia and especially over the Tigray ethnic group. Therefore, we now reached a stage where all the oppressed nations of Ethiopia can no more undertake a common class struggle."

The TPLF castigated the formation of the centralized empire state during the conquests of Menelik II as, "the beginning of national oppression" in the groups manifesto. Initially the group called for independence of Tigray from Ethiopia, arguing that it is the only way to liberate Ethiopian cultures from the ethnic and national oppression of the Amhara culture. However, separatism was abandoned in 1978, which subsequently led to defections and splits within the party. It was increasingly dominated by a faction known as the Marxist–Leninist League of Tigray, which took over the leadership of the party and proclaimed Marxism–Leninism to be the organization's overarching ideology. The party's ideological shift made Marxist aspects temporarily dominate over the ethnonationalist ones, though the party remained ethnonationalist and envisioned a 'national revolution' that would install "a planned socialist economy free of exploitation of man by man". Core Marxist aspects embraced by the TPLF included vanguardism, democratic centralism, dictatorship of the proletariat, and also self-determination in the name of national liberation. The party was also heavily influence by the Albanian communist model of Enver Hoxha, stressing self-reliant economy and every nation having its unique way towards socialism.

After the fall of the USSR, the TPLF moderated itself and rebranded its ideology as "revolutionary democracy", pledging to introduce a new kind of democracy in Ethiopia that would differ from the liberal democratic structure, while also maintaining the core socialist values of the party. The concept of revolutionary democracy came from Lenin's 1919 thesis "Bourgeois Democracy and the Proletarian Dictatorship", which proposed replacing the 'bourgeois' parliamentary democracy with revolutionary democracy, which would be secured by a vanguard party representing the masses, which would consult its constituency while still adhering to the socialist ideological guidelines. Meles Zenawi wrote that Ethiopia can become a developed country "if it is guided by 'revolutionary democracy'", adding that while "liberal democracy is partial wager, a collector of rents, and a representative of the comprador bourgeoisie, 'revolutionary democracy' stands for sustainable development." This marked the point at which TLPF abandoned Marxism–Leninism in favour of socialism and revolutionary ethnonationalism, moving closer to its initial position from the 1970s. It now proposes Marxism adopted to the regional specificities of Tigray instead.

== Allegation of terrorism ==
The United States government removed the TPLF's classification as a Tier III level terrorist group when the group came to power in 1991. However, an analysis by the Terrorism Research and Analysis Consortium (TRAC) also classified it as a terrorist group dating back to 1976. According to the TRAC:

The Tigrayan People's Liberation Front (TPLF) is a political party in Tigray, Ethiopia that has been listed as a perpetrator in the Global Terrorism Database, based on ten incidents occurring between 1976 and 1990 (see GTD link).

In 2021, the Ethiopia federal government passed a parliamentary resolution classifying the TPLF as a terrorist organization. According to Article 23, "this decision applies to organizations and individuals that collaborate with, have links with, or are associated with the ideas and actions of the designated terrorist organizations, as well as others that have undertaken similar activities". Individuals or organizations that carry out " humanitarian activities", however, are exempt under Ethiopia's Anti-Terrorism Proclamation 1176/2020.

On November 3, 2022, the Ethiopian government and the nationalist paramilitary group entered into a peace agreement, ending their two-year conflict. A draft agreement was sent to The Associated Press stating that the TPLF will first be disarmed with their "light weapons" followed by the Ethiopian federal forces' retrieval of "all federal facilities, installations, and major infrastructure such as airports and highways within the Tigray region."

After the signed peace agreement matured for four months, the TPLF was removed from the country's list of terrorist group on March 22, 2023.
