= Ethiopia–Tigray peace agreement =

Peace treaty signed in 2022

Agreement for Lasting Peace through a Permanent Cessation of Hostilities between the Government of the Federal Democratic Republic of Ethiopia and the Tigray People's Liberation Front
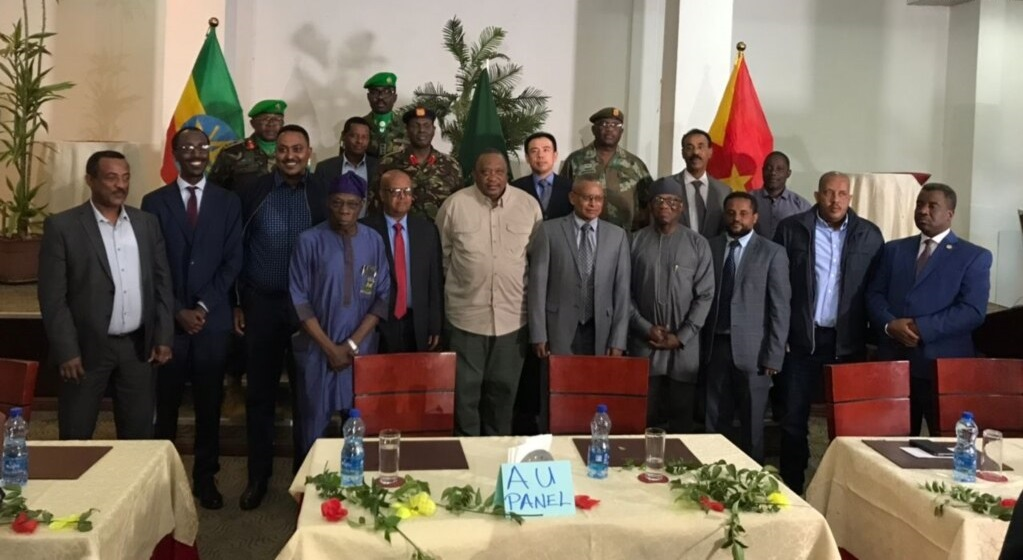
- Type: Peace treaty
- Context: Tigray war
- Signed: 2 November 2022
- Location: Pretoria, South Africa
- Effective: 3 November 2022
- Mediators: Olusegun Obasanjo; Uhuru Kenyatta; Phumzile Mlambo-Ngcuka; Mike Hammer
- Negotiators: Redwan Hussien; Getachew Reda
- Parties: Ethiopia; Tigray People's Liberation Front
- Language: English

The Ethiopia–Tigray peace agreement, also called the Pretoria Agreement (Note: Tigrinya: ስምምዕ ፕሪቶሪያን; Amharic: የፕሪቶሪያ ስምምነት) or the Cessation of Hostilities Agreement (CoHA), is a peace treaty between the government of Ethiopia and the Tigray People's Liberation Front (TPLF) that was signed 2 November 2022, wherein both parties agreed to a "permanent cessation of hostilities" to end the Tigray war. The agreement was made effective the next day on 3 November, marking the second anniversary of the war.

Since 2026, with the intensification of tensions between the TPLF and Ethiopian federal forces, the Pretoria Agreement was effectively rendered invalid, with TPLF spokesman Michael Asgedom stating in September 2026 that the agreement was "no longer valid."

== Background ==
=== Tigray war ===
The war began in November 2020, in the Tigray Region of Ethiopia. Primarily a conflict between the Ethiopian government and Eritrea on one side, and the TPLF on the other, the war has been characterized by war crimes, massacres of civilians, accusations of genocide, and a devastating humanitarian crisis.

On 20 December 2021, after the government successfully pushed back an incursion towards Addis Ababa, the TPLF requested a ceasefire. Fighting slowed down, and on 24 March 2022, the Ethiopian government declared "an indefinite humanitarian truce." Both Ethiopia and the TPLF initially agreed to negotiate an official end to the war; in the intervening months, however, relations became increasingly hostile, with both parties accusing each other of having no sincere interest in peace – by late August, peace talks had deteriorated completely, and the war resumed.

==== Reescalation of the war ====
Following the collapse of the March–August ceasefire, wartime violence surged to a level not seen in months. Joint Ethiopian–Eritrean forces and the TPLF mobilized hundreds of thousands of troops against each other, displacing 574,000 people, and killing around 100,000 more within the span of a few weeks. By October 2022, the war overall had killed around 385,000 to 600,000 people.

The scale of the violence alarmed international observers, including the United Nations and the African Union, who urged the warring parties to return to peace negotiations. UN Secretary-General António Guterres stated that "the situation in Ethiopia is spiraling out of control," and many other agencies, scholars and human rights organizations began to warn of a dramatic rise in hate speech against Tigrayans.

=== New attempts at peace talks ===
Attempts to renegotiate for a peace deal were attempted throughout September and early October. On 7 September, TPLF chairperson Debretsion Gebremichael sent a letter to the UN making a request for peace. He stated that, if the UN Security Council did not intervene:

"[W]e propose a cessation of hostilities that includes the following four elements:

1. An immediate, unconditional and complete lifting of the blockade on essential services.
2. Unfettered humanitarian access, including clear and agreed protocols and arrangements to this effect.
3. The withdrawal of Eritrean forces from every part of Ethiopian and Tigrayan territory, under international monitoring, to positions in which they can no longer pose any threat to us.
4. Return to the constitutionally recognized borders of Tigray as they stood prior to the outbreak of hostilities in November 2020."

On 5 October, both the Ethiopian government and Tigrayan rebel forces accepted an invitation by the AU to have peace talks in South Africa, initially scheduled to take place between 7–8 October. However, talks were soon postponed, reportedly due to a combination of factors, including poor planning, logistical issues, the rapid escalation of fighting, and concerns from the TPLF about not having enough information available on how the talks would be conducted. Eventually, a new date for peace negotiations was set for 25 October, where talks would take place in Pretoria, at South Africa's Department of International Relations and Cooperation.

== Negotiating period ==
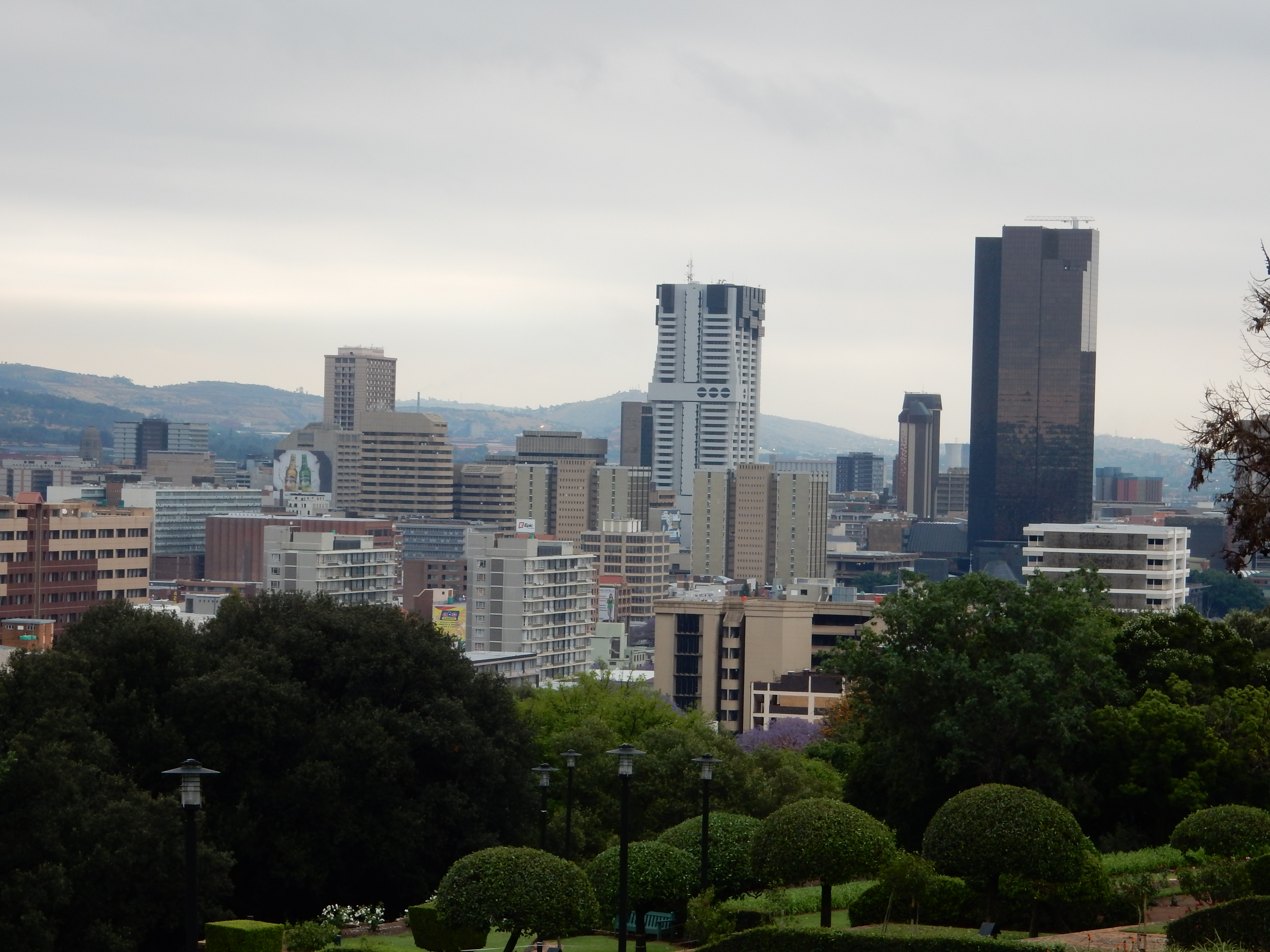
Pretoria, South Africa

The talks were jointly mediated by AU Horn of Africa envoy and former Nigerian President Olusegun Obasanjo, (Note: Preferred mediator for the Ethiopian government) former Kenyan President Uhuru Kenyatta, (Note: Preferred mediator for the TPLF) United States Horn of Africa envoy Mike Hammer, and former Deputy-President of South Africa Phumzile Mlambo-Ngcuka. TPLF spokesperson Getachew Reda and Ethiopian national security advisor Redwan Hussien acted as the lead negotiators. Though originally scheduled to last from 25 to 30 October, this was later extended by a few more days.

Hopes that these talks could definitively stop the war were noted as being low; fighting did not appear to slow down, even as peace discussions began, and Eritrean forces, in particular, were reportedly still engaged in the killing of civilians for most of the negotiating period. On 28 October, Ethiopia vocalized their distrust about the motives of unspecified "western entities" during the process, alleging that "unsubstantiated and politically motivated" claims were being made about the war for a "sinister" agenda, that "irresponsible propaganda" from the TPLF was being repeated uncritically, and further stated that "venerable organizations and well-meaning actors could be unwitting participants in this campaign." Still, despite these concerns, negotiations continued.

=== Conclusion ===
On 2 November 2022, the Ethiopian federal government and the TPLF released a joint statement, in which they stated that they had "agreed to permanently silence the guns and end the two years of conflict in northern Ethiopia." Obasanjo explained that the agreement will involve a "systematic, orderly, smooth and coordinated disarmament."

== Terms of the agreement ==
The full agreement contains a preamble, and 15 articles, starting with the objectives of the agreement (Article 1), followed by the general principles underlying the ceasefire (Article 2). Article 13 instructs both parties to "implement this Agreement in good faith," and avoid trying to undermine it.

Permanent cessation of hostilities

The agreement forbids "all forms of hostilities," both direct and indirect; this includes participating in proxy wars, using hate speech, propaganda, airstrikes or landmines, or collaborating with any hostile "external force" against each other.

Protection of civilians

Both parties agreed to follow international human rights laws and protect civilians from human rights violations. Specific condemnations were made towards acts of sexual and gender-based violence, violence against children (including the use of child soldiers), violence against women and girls, and violence against the elderly.

Humanitarian access

The Ethiopian government is to allow humanitarian aid into the country as soon as possible, and reintegrate internally displaced persons and refugees into Ethiopian society, provided it is safe enough to do so. Both parties agreed to cooperate with each other, as well as with humanitarian agencies working to reunite families. Both parties also agreed to not misappropriate aid, and make sure it is actually used for humanitarian purposes.

Disarmament, demobilization and reintegration

Ethiopia and the TPLF agreed that an open communication channel should be created "within 24 hours" of signing the agreement. Both parties also needed to recognize that Ethiopia "has only one defense force," that Tigrayan rebel forces should "demobiliz[e] and reintegrat[e]", and that the TPLF must completely disarm (Note: Tigrayan rebels needed to disarm themselves of heavy weapons as soon as possible, while firearms overall had to be removed 30 days from signing the agreement) within 30 days of signing.

Confidence-building measures

The TPLF agreed to:

1. Respect the authority of the government.
2. "Refrain from aiding and abetting, supporting, or collaborating with any armed or subversive group in any part of the country."
3. Respect the "constitutional mandate of the Federal Government" to send troops and security forces into Tigray.
4. Not conscript, train or deploy military forces, or to act in "preparation for conflict."
5. Respect Ethiopian sovereignty, and to not undermine it, either on their own, or through "relations with foreign powers."
6. Not force a change in the government through unconstitutional means.

Meanwhile, the government agreed to:

1. Stop all military operations against "TPLF combatants."
2. Restore basic, essential services to Tigray as soon as possible.
3. Stop designating the TPLF as a terrorist group.
4. Provide unhindered humanitarian access to Tigray.

International boundaries and federal facilities

As part of the agreement, the ENDF will be deployed along the international borders of Ethiopia; the agreement states that they must "safeguard the sovereignty, territorial integrity, and security of the country from foreign incursion and ensure that there will be no provocation or incursion from either side of the border."

Federal authorities will also take "full and effective control" of all aviation space, airports and highways in Tigray.

Restoration of federal authority and Tigrayan representation

The agreement stipulates that the Ethiopian federal government must be allowed to reestablish authority in the Tigray Region, including in the capital of Mekelle, and that "the ENDF and other relevant Federal Institutions shall have an expeditious, smooth, peaceful, and coordinated entry" into the city. In exchange, government guaranteed that Tigray will be properly represented in government institutions, so as to not violate the Ethiopian constitution.

Transitional measures

"Within a week" of the TPLF's terrorist designation being removed – but before elections are held – an "Inclusive Regional Administration" should be established; a week after the removal of the "terrorist" designation, both parties must engage in a political dialogue to "find lasting solutions." Ethiopia also agreed to institute a transitional justice policy that will aim to be accountable and truthful, and give justice to victims.

Additionally, both parties pledged to resolve "issues of contested areas," in a way that complies with the Constitution of Ethiopia.

Monitoring, verification and compliance

It was agreed that this process must be monitored and observed by a "Joint Committee," with one representative each from the Ethiopian government, the TPLF and the Intergovernmental Authority on Development (IGAD), all while being presided over by the African Union through a "High-Level Panel."

== Implementation ==
Nairobi Declaration
Declaration of the Senior Commanders on the Modalities for the Implementation of the Agreement for Lasting Peace Through a Permanent Cessation of Hostilities between the Federal Democratic Republic of Ethiopia (FDRE) and the Tigray People's Liberation Front (TPLF)
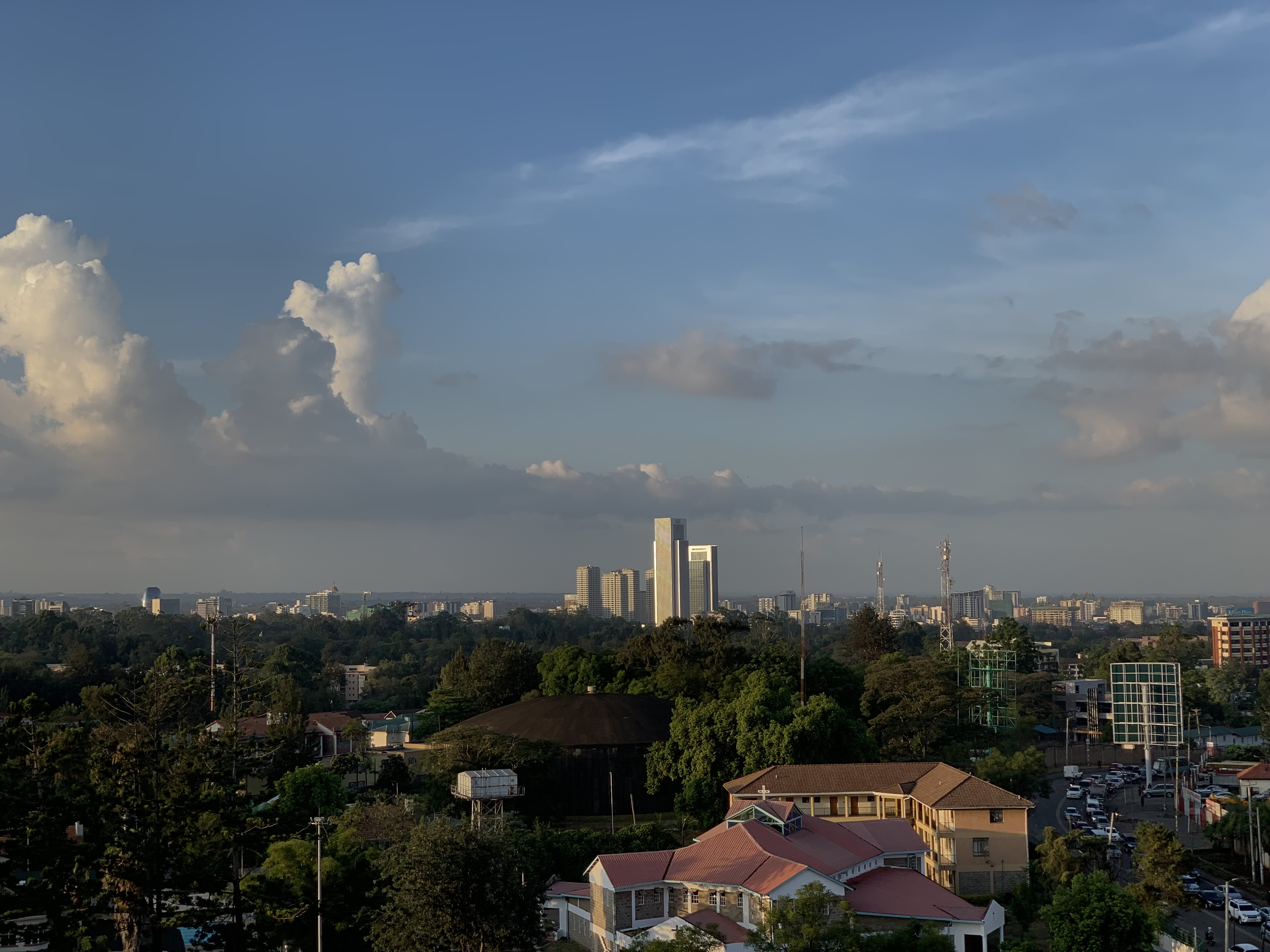
- Nairobi, Kenya in 2023
- Context: Implementing the peace agreement
- Signed: 12 November 2022
- Location: Nairobi, Kenya
- Mediators: Olusegun Obasanjo; Uhuru Kenyatta
- Negotiators: Birhanu Jula; Tadesse Werede
- Parties: Ethiopia; TPLF
- Language: English

=== Nairobi Declaration ===
On 7 November 2022, five days after the agreement was signed, Ethiopian and Tigrayan military officials – primarily, ENDF Chief of Staff Birhanu Jula and Tigray Defence Forces (TDF) Commander-in-Chief Tadesse Werede – met for a new set of talks in Nairobi, Kenya, in order to discuss restoring humanitarian access to the Tigray Region, as well as the process of Tigrayan disarmament. On 12 November, they signed a declaration reaffirming their commitment to the original agreement, laid out the specifics of how to implement it, and agreed to begin the Tigrayan disarmament process on 15 November. Both parties also agreed to create a Joint Committee, per the agreement's rules on "Monitoring, Verification, and Compliance."

==== Humanitarian access ====
In the immediate days after the signing of the Pretoria agreement, Tigrayan civilians, international observers and humanitarian organizations expressed a hope that aid would finally be made available in the region. The agreement stated that Ethiopia must "mobilize and expedite humanitarian assistance for all those in need." Within hours of the agreement being signed, UN personnel began talks with Ethiopian officials to remove the blockade, with supplies already prepared to be sent in immediately.

By 9 November, concerns were being vocalized about the continued lack of aid to Tigray, as a number of humanitarian agencies were reporting that they were being prevented from delivering aid to the area. On 11 November, Ethiopia's Redwan Hussien responded to these concerns by saying that "aid is flowing like no other times." This statement was seemingly at odds with outside reports, and was deemed to be false by Tigrayan officials and local humanitarian workers, with Getachew Reda telling Agence France-Presse (AFP) that Redwan was "plucking his facts out of thin air."

On 12 November, military leaders from both parties announced in a joint statement that, as part of the Nairobi declaration, they had agreed to lift the restrictions on aid to those who needed it in Tigray and the surrounding regions; Obasanjo made assurances that humanitarian access would "begin with immediate effect." Later that same day, Ethiopian authorities stated that they were making efforts to "deliver humanitarian assistance to most of the Tigray region," of which around 70% was now claimed to be under their control.

On 15 November, the International Committee of the Red Cross (ICRC) announced that, for the first time since August, their delivery of medical supplies had reached the Tigrayan capital of Mekelle. The World Food Programme and World Health Organization also sent in nearly 18,000 metric tonnes of aid. Even with this relaxation of restrictions, however, UN officials stated in late November that some parts of Tigray – namely in the Southern and Eastern zones – "remain constrained," and called for restrictions in these areas to be lifted. In early January 2023, the biggest hospital in the region claimed that they were still short on medical supplies, and had not received enough help from the federal government to alleviate this shortage.

==== Restoration of services ====
The Commercial Bank of Ethiopia stated on 12 November that access to backing services had been restored in the Western Zone of Tigray (which was still under occupation by the Amhara Region), and was planning on doing the same in Mekelle. On 23 November, Ethiopian Airlines announced it was prepared to have regularly scheduled flights into Tigray resume (with flights between Addis Ababa and Mekelle returning in late December). Ethio Telecom reestablished its telecommunication services in Shire on 2 December, and by the end of the month, they had also returned to Mekelle and 27 other towns in the region. On 6 December, Ethiopian Electric Power said that it had restored Mekelle's access to Ethiopia's overall electrical grid.

On 29 November, Ethiopian official Belete Molla stated that, while they planned to restore Tigray's access to the internet eventually, they did not have a set timeline on when this would occur.

=== Cessation of hostilities ===
In accordance with the agreement, a "hotline" between the two parties was established, with the goal of "fully communicating with all their units to stop fighting," and prevent mistrust from developing, according to an anonymous official familiar with the Nairobi discussions. Despite these assurances, however, some Tigrayan officials alleged as early as 4 November that attacks from Ethiopian and Eritrean forces were still taking place. News agencies were unable to verify these claims independently, as Tigray was reportedly still under an information blackout.

On 9 November, Mohammed Idris, Director-General of the Ethiopian Media Authority (EMA), announced that new guidelines were being established for how the Ethiopian media reports on news of these negotiations. This was done as a way to keep it in line with the peace agreement's rules against hate speech and propaganda, as "false information and hateful speech are counterproductive to the ideas of peace." The 12 November declaration makes a specific note about a "Responsible Use of Media," stating that media controlled by both parties should "play a constructive role" in carrying out the aims of the Pretoria agreement.

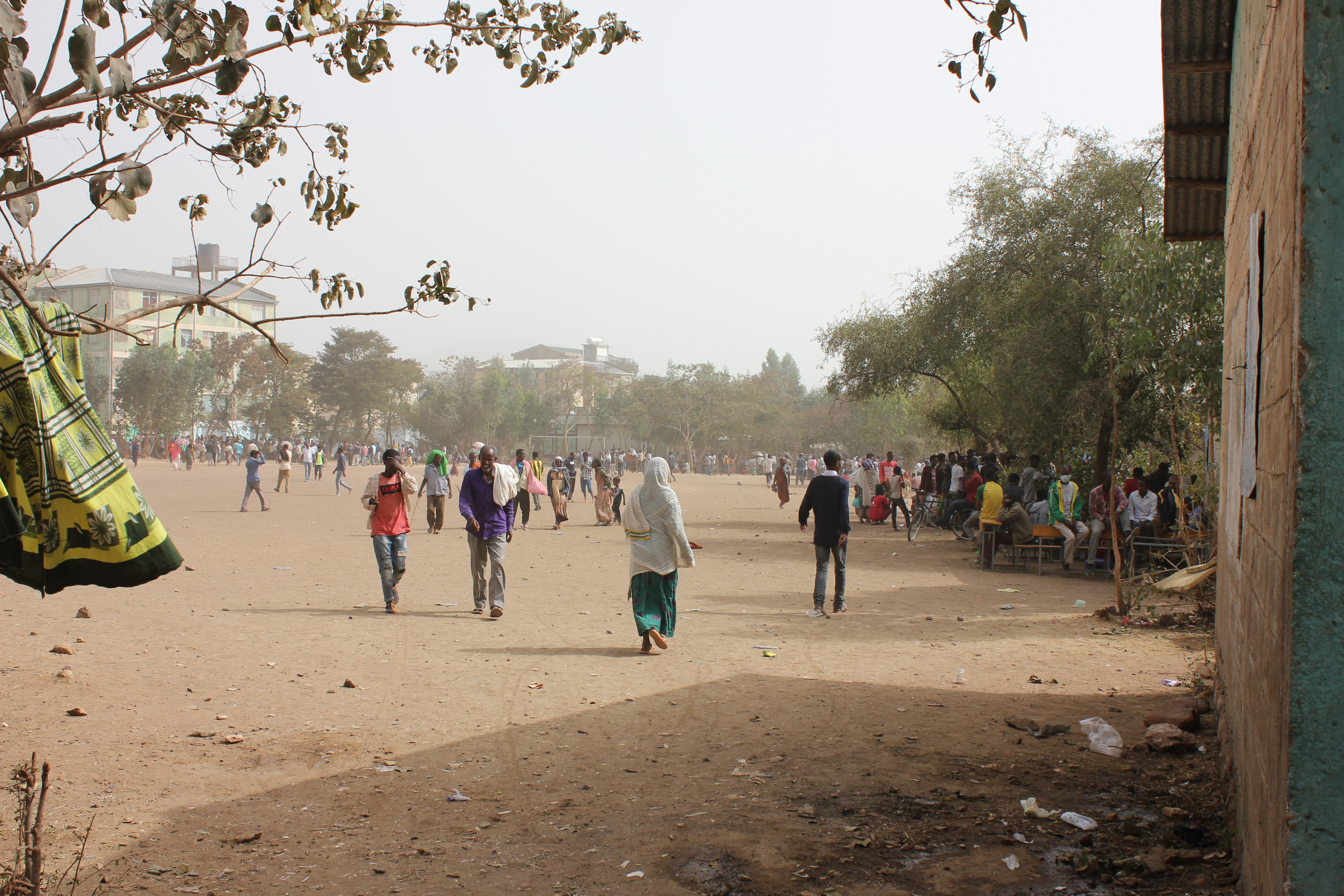
Internally displaced people in Shire, Tigray Region, where disarmament talks were being held.

==== Disarmament and withdrawal ====
On 1 December 2022, the Ethiopian–TPLF Joint Committee met in Shire, Tigray Region to begin a new set of talks on carrying out disarmament. One day later, the TPLF announced that they had withdrawn their troops from a number of towns and cities, and by 4 December, Tadesse Werede stated that around 65% of their forces had withdrawn.

Starting on 10 January 2023, Tigrayan forces began the process of handing over their heavy weaponry to the ENDF.

==== Amhara and Eritrea ====
The Nairobi Declaration added a corollary to the Tigrayan armament clause, which stated that the disarming of heavy weapons "will be done concurrently with the withdrawal of foreign and non-ENDF forces in the region." In spite of this, Eritrea, as well as Amhara regional forces, continued to engage in fighting, even as the federal government expressed support for peace. According to eyewitnesses, aid workers and Tigrayan officials, both Eritrean and Amhara forces were responsible for killings, looting, kidnappings and mass detentions throughout November 2022, including in Shire, where disarmament talks were later held.

News footage from VOA Tigrigna of Eritrean forces leaving a city (20 January 2023).

The Eritrean Defence Forces started withdrawing from Shire and Axum on 29 December. Despite this, humanitarian workers said that the EDF was still maintaining a presence in the region, and according to Addis Standard, both EDF and Amhara forces continued to be in Tigray by early January 2023.

=== Interim Regional Administration of Tigray ===
In mid-March 2023, the TPLF central committee voted internally in favour of recommending Getachew Reda (18 votes out of 41) as the head of the Interim Regional Administration of Tigray (IRA). The federal-level Cabinet met the following day to establish guidelines for the IRA. On 23 March, prime minister Abiy Ahmed declared that Getachew Reda was appointed to the position of head of the IRA.

== Analysis ==
=== Potential to end the war ===
There is general acknowledgement among the mediators, as well as some outside observers, that the agreement represents a step towards peace, but that true peace had yet to be fully realized. Olusegun Obasanjo said, after the agreement was signed, that "this moment is not the end of the peace process. Implementation of the peace agreement signed today is critical for its success." Uhuru Kenyatta said that "the lasting solution can only be through political engagement and being able to accommodate our differences," but cautioned that "the devil will be in the implementation." Rama Yade, French politician and senior director at the Atlantic Council, stated that while the agreement is a step forward, peace had not been achieved yet. She further said that in order for a cessation of hostilities to turn into peace, the agreement has to be implemented "decisively," and unresolved issues would need to be addressed.

=== Tigrayan disarmament ===
Prior to this agreement, the TPLF had rejected calls to disarm by the Ethiopian government, and questions have been raised as to how it will be carried out, or if it will be successful; Eritrea's continued presence in Tigray was noted as a potential roadblock to this being achieved. Peace and conflict studies professor Kjetil Tronvoll argued the issue of disarmament would be "extremely controversial," thinking it unlikely that Tigrayan rebel forces would voluntarily disarm "in the face of an enemy they have been fighting for two years." Benjamin Petrini of the International Institute for Strategic Studies questioned what security guarantees would be provided to the TPLF, saying they would not completely disarm for "vague promises."

The Global Society of Tigray Scholars and Professionals (GSTS), an organization representing 5,000 Tigrayan academics, strongly rejected the disarmament clause. While they welcomed the peace agreement overall, they argued that disarmament was "illogical" and "self-defeating," and that it could potentially undermine the ceasefire. They stated that entrusting all of Tigray's security to the ENDF made Tigrayans too vulnerable to possible violent attacks, particularly from the Eritrean military and Amhara regional forces. The GSTS argued, instead, that the TDF should be strengthened, describing the actions of Ethiopian and Eritrean allied troops as genocidal, and therefore, not to be trusted with the protection of Tigrayans.

=== Eritrea ===
Eritrea's absence from the peace talks was noted by many news outlets, both before and after the agreement was signed. Eritrean authorities made no statements on the agreement, nor did they respond to most requests for comment. It was also not clear if they would agree to the ceasefire, and it was suggested that President Isaias Afwerki's long-standing antagonism to the TPLF would disincentivize him from withdrawing Eritrean forces. When asked by Reuters, Eritrean Foreign Minister Osman Saleh said that he had no comment, as "he had just received the documents." Eritrea was firmly on the side of the Ethiopian government throughout the war, and was attributed responsibility for high-profile atrocities such as the Axum massacre. Their outsized role led to them being described by Le Monde contributor Noé Hochet-Bodin as a "shadow [that] looms over the conflict."

The negotiating and mediating parties, likewise, generally chose not to address the question of Eritrea outright. When asked questions about it during the Nairobi talks, Uhuru Kenyatta said that they were "not here to talk about any particular country this way or that way," and were instead focused on the topic of peace. Ethiopia's Redwan Hussien said that Ethiopia and Tigray were so busy fighting each other that it "paved the way for a third party to undermine us further." He also said that this unnamed third party "may not be interested in this peace process"; the Associated Press interpreted this as an indirect comment about Eritrea.

While Eritrea is not mentioned by name, sections in the Pretoria document about stopping "provocation or incursion from either side of the border" were interpreted by East Africa correspondent for The New York Times, Abdi Latif Dahir, as being directed towards Eritrea. The International Crisis Group's Alan Boswell also supported this interpretation, saying that the provision may have been "designed to assure the Tigrayans that Eritrea will withdraw." Etana Habte, assistant history professor at James Madison University, said the choice to not mention Eritrea directly may have been a deliberate attempt to ease Eritrea into complying to the agreement, as the African Union "doesn't have the military ability to enforce its decisions and relies on the support and alliance of member countries."

=== Amhara and territorial disputes ===
While Amhara Region security forces also played a significant role during the war, Amhara was, similarly, not included in the negotiations. In the early months of the conflict, Amhara regional forces took control of Tigray's Western Zone – an area that was already the source of intense dispute between Amhara and Tigray – and proceeded to commit what was described as an ethnic cleansing of Tigrayans in the area. The TPLF had previously stated that the return of the Western Zone to Tigrayan control was a "non-negotiable" prerequisite to peace. National Movement of Amhara founder Dessalegn Chanie Dagnew and advocacy group Amhara Association of America both welcomed news of the agreement, but also expressed opposition to any potential territorial concessions to Tigray.

Multiple news outlets described the agreement as having an unclear stance on the issue. In a speech to parliament on 15 November 2022, Prime Minister Abiy said he was looking for a constitutional solution for this dispute, and that "unless the people of Wolkait [in Western Tigray] get the opportunity to self-determination, there won't be a lasting peace."

=== Human rights concerns ===
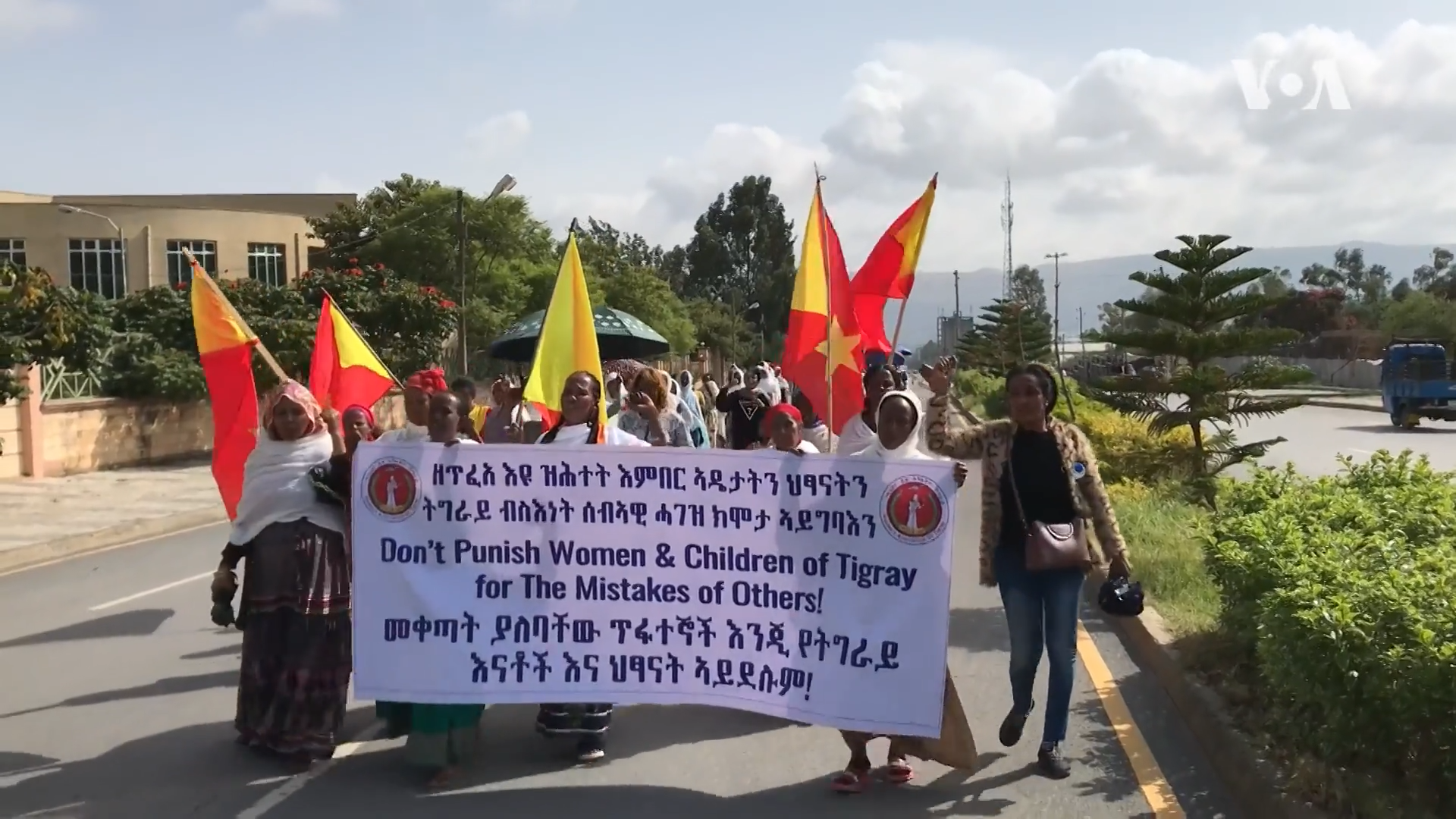
Peaceful protests in Mekelle, Tigray Region (December 2022); protesters hold up a banner that reads, in part: "Don't Punish Women & Children of Tigray for The Mistakes of Others!"

Amnesty International's Director for East and Southern Africa, Muleya Mwananyanda, expressed dissatisfaction with the peace agreement, stating that while it was "a step in the right direction," it nevertheless "fails to offer a clear roadmap on how to ensure accountability for war crimes and crimes against humanity" committed by all sides during the war. Mwananyanda further emphasized that human rights investigators must be allowed "unfettered access" in order for victims to receive proper justice.

Human Rights Watch noted that the documents do not make explicit mentions of ethnic cleansing in the Western Zone, and stated that it generally "lacks details on formal accountability." The government-established Ethiopian Human Rights Commission issued a statement saying that, for peace to be sustainably achieved, the implementation of the agreement "should be preceded and informed by a nation-wide, genuine, consultative, inclusive, and victim-centred conversation."

Filsan Abdi, a former member of Prime Minister Abiy's cabinet, said in an interview with PBS NewHour that reaching an agreement to end the war, while necessary, should not mean they "forgo seeking justice and accountability" for victims of human rights violations, and especially in cases of sexual violence against women and girls. Filsan resigned from her position as Minister of Women, Children and Youth in September 2021, in response to what she considered to be willful obstruction by the government in regards to publishing reports on sexual violence committed during the war.

== Initial reactions ==
=== Signing parties ===
==== Ethiopia ====
- Prime Minister Abiy Ahmed welcomed the agreement, stating that it was "monumental in moving Ethiopia forward on the path of the reforms we embarked upon four and a half years ago." He stated further that Ethiopia's "commitment to peace remains steadfast. And our commitment to collaborating for the implementation of the agreement is equally strong." On Twitter, he expressed his gratitude to many, including the African Union Commission, the mediation team, the "friends of Ethiopia" and the Ethiopian National Defense Forces.
  - National security advisor Redwan Hussien said after the signing: "We thank our brothers from the other side also for this constructive engagement to allow the country to put this tragic period of conflict behind us. It is now for all of us to honour this agreement. We must be true to the letter and to the spirit of this agreement."

==== TPLF ====
- Spokesperson Getachew Reda said "we are ready to implement and expedite this agreement," and indicated that the TPLF had made "painful concessions" in order to "build trust." He further stated: "ultimately, the fact that we have reached a point where we have now signed an agreement speaks volumes about the readiness on the part of the two sides to lay the past behind them to chart a new path of peace." He lamented, however, that the war "has turned Ethiopia, once on the cusp of great economic progress, into a bad parody of itself and caused tremendous suffering to the people of Tigray."
  - Getachew acknowledged on 7 November that "whether we will deliver on our promise in a manner that satisfies our people time will tell," but reiterated his support for the agreement, saying if it "can ensure our survival, why not give it a try?!"

=== Other countries ===
- Canada said it welcomed the agreement, congratulated everyone involved in the peace process, and called on them to protect civilians and address "the pressing humanitarian needs" of Ethiopians.
- Chinese Foreign Ministry Spokesperson Zhao Lijian said, during a press conference, that China "welcomes and commends" the agreement, supports Ethiopia's territorial integrity, and believes in "achieving reconciliation through political dialogue." He further stated that China will "continue to play a constructive role in efforts toward lasting peace, development and prosperity in Ethiopia."
- (Djibouti) Djiboutian President Ismaïl Omar Guelleh welcomed the news of the peace agreement, and congratulated the combined efforts of everyone involved in creating "security, peace and prosperity to our region and to our Ethiopian brothers."
- France, through its Ministry for Europe and Foreign Affairs, said it supported the agreement, praising the "wisdom and courage of the parties, paving the way to a political dialogue," and urged that both humanitarian aid and basic services are made available to those in need as soon as possible.
- (Iran) Iranian Ministry of Foreign Affairs Spokesperson Nasser Kanaani welcomed the peace accord, congratulating the African Union and South Africa for successfully arranging it. He further expressed hope that this would "lead to stability, development, and growth in Ethiopia and peace for its people."
- (Liberia) Former President Ellen Johnson Sirleaf welcomed the news of the agreement, saying "I hope this will be the first step towards sustainable peace, built on dialogue and political engagement."
- (Russia) The Russian Embassy in Ethiopia said that it welcomed the agreement, saying it hopes that it will "serve as a solid foundation" for rebuilding the country.
- South Sudan's Ministry of Foreign Affairs and International Cooperation said the agreement "signifies a momentous step towards peace," and that they "stand with the signatories" in working to ensure peace and prosperity in the region.
- Vice President Mohamed Hamdan Dagalo said that Sudan supported the agreement, and that they "commend the positive spirit that prevailed among the parties."
- Turkey welcomed the agreement, and supported "the establishment of peace and tranquility in Ethiopia."
- (United Arab Emirates) The UAE Ministry of Foreign Affairs welcomed the news of a peace agreement, commending the efforts of everyone involved, and vocalized support for allowing humanitarian access into the country.
- (United Kingdom) British Foreign Secretary James Cleverly said the UK welcomed the agreement, saying "I applaud their choice of peace, and the mediation efforts of African Union, South Africa and Kenya. UK is ready to support the peace process."
- U.S. Secretary of State Antony Blinken expressed support for the agreement, saying on Twitter that he "commend the [African Union] for its extraordinary efforts to bring peace to northern Ethiopia."
  - State Department spokesperson Ned Price said the agreement "represents an important step towards peace."
  - White House press secretary Karine Jean-Pierre said during a press conference that the United States "remains committed" to supporting the peace process "to ensure it brings a lasting peace to Ethiopia."
  - Jim Risch, Republican Senator and Ranking Member of the Senate Foreign Relations Committee, called on U.S. President Joe Biden to "hold Ethiopian leaders accountable," and said, while mentioning the peace agreement, that the war had prevented millions in the region from getting access to humanitarian assistance.

=== International organizations ===
- (United Nations) UN Secretary-General António Guterres praised the agreement, and urged "all Ethiopians and the international community to support the bold step taken today."
  - Secretary-General spokesperson Stéphane Dujarric stated "It is very much a welcome first step, which we hope can start to bring some solace to the millions of Ethiopian civilians that have really suffered during this conflict."
- Director-General of the World Health Organization, Tedros Adhanom Ghebreyesus, said, of the agreement: "peace is a prerequisite for health. We welcome the commitment of the Parties to work towards peace in Tigray, Ethiopia."
- AU Commission Chairperson Moussa Faki said that he "warmly commend the Parties for signing a cessations of hostilities agreement following talks facilitated by the AU Panel" and that the African Union "is committed to continue supporting the Parties to find lasting peace & reconciliation for all Ethiopians."
  - Acting Director of Africa CDC Ogwell Ouma stated that, while they were not present at the signing, they were nevertheless pleased to hear about the outcome of the talks. Ouma further indicated that "as soon as the situation allows, we will be sending back our teams to the ground because there's a lot of the public health emergency issues to deal with at the moment."
- (European Union) Union Minister for Foreign Affairs Josep Borrell stated that "further negotiations are encouraged to reach a permanent ceasefire agreement." He also said that "the EU stands by the families of the people who have been killed and those who have been victims of the worst atrocities [of the war]," and urged that the perpetrators of the aforementioned crimes be held accountable for their actions.
- The Intergovernmental Authority on Development's Executive Secretary, Workneh Gebeyehu, expressed his "deep satisfaction" at the outcome of the talks, and congratulated Abiy Ahmed, the mediation teams and the African Union for successfully negotiating for a peace agreement.
- The International Monetary Fund (IMF) welcomed the agreement, calling it "a critical step towards restoring lasting peace and stability."
- Oxfam's Ethiopia director, Gezahegn Gebrehana, welcomed the news of the agreement, expressing "hope that both parties will follow upon their respective commitments" and give full humanitarian access for relief agencies "to refresh their supplies and rapidly scale-up lifesaving aid."

== See also ==
- Algiers Agreement (2000), the agreement that formally ended the Eritrean–Ethiopian War
- 2018 Eritrea–Ethiopia summit, which ended the Eritrean–Ethiopian border conflict
- Ethiopia–African Union relations
