= Tadesse Werede =

Ethiopian politician (born 1958)

Lieutenant General Tadesse Werede Wedi Werede
- ታደሰ ወረደ (ወዲ ወረደ)

Chief Administrator of the Interim Regional Administration of Tigray
- In office 8 April 2025 – 1 May 2026
- Preceded by: Getachew Reda

Deputy Chief Administrator of the Interim Regional Administration of Tigray
- In office 25 March 2023 – 8 April 2025

Commander in Chief, Tigray Defense Forces
- Incumbent
- Assumed office 2021
- Preceded by: Tsadkan Gebretensae

Army Corps Commander, Tigray Defense Force
- In office 2020–2021

Head of Mission and Force Commander for the United Nations Interim Security Force for Abyei
- In office 27 July 2011 – 12 March 2013
- Nominated by: Ban Ki-moon
- Succeeded by: Yohannes Gebremeskel Tesfamariam

Head of the Joint Training Department, Ethiopian National Defense Force

Personal details
- Born: 13 July 1958 (age 68) Mekelle, Tigray, Ethiopian Empire

Lieutenant General Tadesse Werede Tesfay (Tigrinya: ታደሰ ወረደ (ወዲ ወረደ); born 13 July 1958) is an Ethiopian military officer and politician who was Commander-in Chief of the Tigray Defense Forces in 2021, and currently the chief administrator of the Tigray Region from 2025 to 2026.

== Life and career ==
Tadesse Werede was born in Mekelle, a city in Enderta woreda of the Tigray Region on 13 July 1958. He was the Head of Mission and Force Commander of the United Nations Interim Security Force for Abyei (UNISFA) from its inception in 2011 until 2013. He was appointed by the United Nations Secretary-General Ban Ki-moon to implement the mandate of the UN peacekeeping mission in the region of Abyei in Sudan, an oil-producing region with disputable borders between the governments of Sudan and South Sudan.

UNISFA was established by the United Nations Security Council Resolution 1990 of 27 June 2011. Lieutenant General Tadesse Werede Tesfay was appointed to oversee the monitoring and verification of the withdrawal of all armed forces in Abyei.
