= Getachew Reda =

Ethiopian politician (born 1973)

- ጌታቸው ረዳ
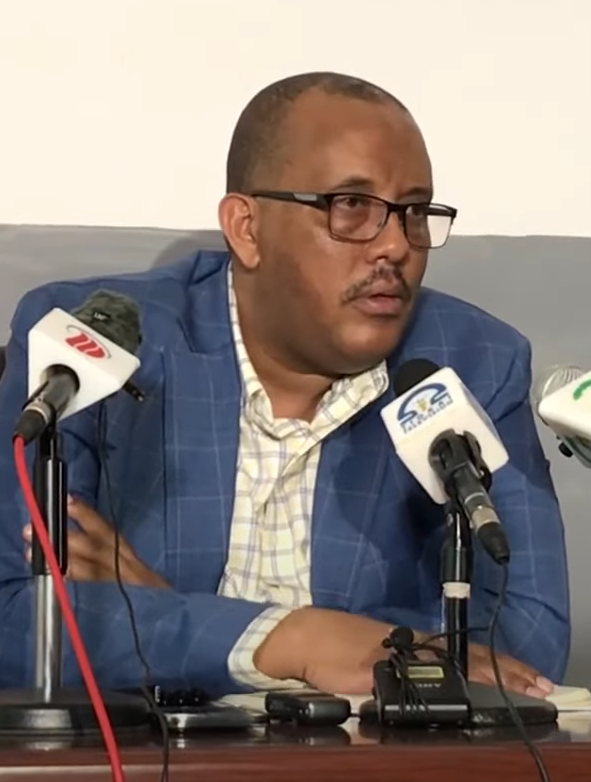
- Getachew Reda in September 2023

Minister Advisor for East African Affairs
- Incumbent
- Assumed office 11 April 2025
- Prime Minister: Abiy Ahmed

Chief Administrator of the Interim Regional Administration of Tigray
- In office 23 March 2023 – 8 April 2025
- Preceded by: Debretsion Gebremichael; Abraham Belay
- Succeeded by: Tadesse Werede

Spokesperson for the Tigray People's Liberation Front
- In office 2020–2025

Minister of Communication Affairs
- In office 2012 – 1 November 2016
- President: Mulatu Teshome
- Prime Minister: Meles Zenawi; Hailemariam Desalegn
- Preceded by: Bereket Simon
- Succeeded by: Negeri Lencho

Personal details
- Born: June 1974 (age 52) Alamata, Wollo Province, Ethiopian Empire (present-day Alamata, Tigray Region, Ethiopia)
- Party: Tigray People's Liberation Front (formerly) Tigray Liberal Democratic Party (since 2025)
- Education: Addis Ababa University (LL.B); Alabama University (LL.M)
- Nicknames: Made them frighten (ኣርዓዶም); Son of Reda (ወዲ ረዳ); Sanitizer (ሳኒታይዘር)

Military service
- Allegiance: Tigray
- Branch: Tigray Defense Forces
- Conflicts: Tigray War

Getachew Reda Kahsay (Tigrinya: ጌታቸው ረዳ ካሕሳይ; born June 1974) is an Ethiopian politician who is serving as the Minister Advisor for East African Affairs. Before this role, he served as the Chief Administrator of the Interim Regional Administration of Tigray, following his appointment by the Office of the Prime Minister of Ethiopia on 23 March 2023. Before assuming power as chief administrator, he was a longtime advisor to the former president of the Tigray Region, Debretsion Gebremichael.

Getachew was also an executive committee member and the spokesperson for the Tigray People's Liberation Front.

Getachew was the Minister of Government Communications Affairs in Prime Minister Hailemariam Desalegn's federal government of Ethiopia until 2016.

== Early life and education ==
Getachew completed his undergraduate studies at Addis Ababa University's School of Law. Between 2001 and 2002, he completed a Master of Law at Alabama University, Tuscaloosa, United States. Before taking a government position in 2009, he served as a professor of law at Mekelle University, located in the capital city of Tigray Region.

== Career ==
=== Tigray War ===
Getachew worked as the political advisor of the President of the Tigray Region, Debretsion Gebremichael, in supporting the Tigray Defense Forces (TDF) in their war with the federal government of Ethiopia, Amhara Special Forces, Fano militia and the foreign government of Eritrea. Getachew, in an interview with Tigray TV, urged young people and others in the region to "rise and deploy to battle in tens of thousands." In April 2021, Getachew's Twitter account was verified.

On 28 June 2021, Getachew announced that the TDF had captured Mekelle, causing the ENDF soldiers to retreat entirely from the area. The Ethiopian federal government declared a unilateral ceasefire starting from 28 June 2021 until the farming season ends. On 20 December 2021, Getachew announced that the TDF had withdrawn from both Amhara and Afar regions in an attempt to induce the international community to put pressure on the Ethiopian and Eritrean governments and to facilitate the distribution of humanitarian aid in the two conflict regions. However Billene Seyoum, the spokesman for Abiy Ahmed, disputed this claim and asserted that the announcement was a cover-up for military setbacks.

On 2 November 2022, Getachew was the Tigray representative present for the signing of the agreement to permanently cease hostilities with the Ethiopian central government.

=== After the Tigray War ===
On 23 March 2023, Getachew's appointment as head of the Interim Regional Administration of Tigray was announced.

In March 2025, The Guardian reported that a faction of the Tigray People's Liberation Front, led by Debretsion Gebremichael, took over several offices in the Tigray regional capital of Mekelle. In what it called a coup, it reported that armed men belonging to the faction patrolled the streets of Mekelle at night, checking people's identification. The Guardian also said that there are some reports suggesting that Eritrean intelligence helped Debretsion's faction assume power. Meanwhile, it reported that Getachew had fled to Addis Ababa. On 11 April 2025, it was announced that Getachew Reda had been appointed as Prime Minister Abiy Ahmed Ali's Advisor for East African Affairs.

In a December 2025 interview on Al Jazeera English's Head to Head with journalist Mehdi Hasan, former Tigray People's Liberation Front spokesman and current adviser to the Ethiopian federal government Reda addressed criticism over his cooperation with Prime Minister Abiy Ahmed, whom he had previously accused of atrocities and acts amounting to genocide during the Tigray war. Hasan repeatedly pressed Reda on what commentators and critics described as a striking political and moral contradiction between his wartime rhetoric and his later role within the administration of a government he had once denounced as responsible for mass atrocities. Referring to Reda’s earlier calls urging Tigrayans to "rise and deploy to battle in tens of thousands", Hasan asked how victims of the war should interpret his decision to work alongside what Hasan termed "the architect of their suffering". Reda defended his wartime mobilisation appeals as necessary acts of self-defence, but also acknowledged failures by the Tigrayan leadership, stating that "we have failed them miserably ... I am part of the blame", and said his current role was motivated by a desire to atone for those failures and prevent similar loss of life in the future.

The interview generated significant discussion among members of the Tigrayan diaspora and online commentators, some of whom characterised Reda’s political transition from anti-government spokesman to federal adviser as emblematic of perceived hypocrisy, disillusionment, or political pragmatism following the conflict.

During the same interview, activist Vanessa Tsehaye, from Amnesty International, questioned Reda regarding accountability for alleged war crimes committed during the conflict and criticised the dismantling of international investigative mechanisms. Tsehaye argued that domestic accountability had historically failed in Ethiopia and noted that previous African Union and United Nations investigations had been shut down following lobbying efforts by the Ethiopian federal government. Reda responded that domestic transitional justice mechanisms alone would be insufficient, stating that "there needs to be an international component to the quest for justice". Although he said he could not speak on behalf of the government regarding the closure of the investigations, he expressed personal support for "some kind of tribunal" involving international actors, while clarifying that he was speaking in his capacity as an adviser rather than a policymaker.
