= Dedebit Elementary School airstrike =

2022 airstrike in the Tigray Region, Ethiopia

- Part of the Tigray war
- Aftermath of the airstrike

- Location of Dedebit in Tigray Region, Ethiopia Dedebit (Ethiopia)
- Location: 14.07344°N 37.76440°E; Dedebit, North Western Zone, Tigray Region, Ethiopia
- Date: 7–8 January 2022; ~23:00–00:00 (UTC+3)
- Attack type: Airstrike
- Weapon: MAM-Ls from a Baykar Bayraktar TB2
- Deaths: 56–59
- Injuries: 30–126+
- Perpetrator: Ethiopian Air Force

In the late hours of 7 January 2022 (Ethiopian Christmas), the Ethiopian Air Force (ETAF) carried out an airstrike on a camp for internally displaced persons (IDP) set up in Dedebit Elementary School, located in the Tigray Region of Ethiopia. Between 56 and 59 people were killed in the attack, and at least 30 others were left injured.

The month before the airstrike, the Tigray People's Liberation Front (TPLF) withdrew its forces after a failed offensive towards Addis Ababa, with officials from the Ethiopian federal government asserting they had reduced the TPLF's capacity to engage in warfare. In early January 2022, despite outward appearances of support for a peaceful resolution to the Tigray war (including the release of Tigrayan political prisoners), the ETAF began launching a series of airstrikes on Tigray between 7 and 14 January. The deadliest attack of this campaign happened in Dedebit, where a Bayraktar TB2 combat drone launched three bombs at a school-turned-IDP camp. According to survivors, aid workers, and investigators from Human Rights Watch (HRW) and the United Nations (UN), the camp was not being used for military purposes.

The attack was condemned by the TPLF and international observers. Investigators described it as a war crime, and particularly as an intentional and disproportionate violation of the law regarding the safety of civilians. The airstrike caused humanitarian agencies in the immediate area to suspend their activities, and prompted the relocation of Dedebit's displaced persons to other parts of Tigray. Neither Ethiopia nor Turkey (the most likely supplier of the TB2 drone) commented on the attack.

== Background ==
=== Tigray war ===
The Tigray war began in early November 2020, with the Ethiopian federal government, Eritrea and the Amhara Region on one side, and the ruling party of the Tigray Region, the TPLF, on the other. After a period of guerilla warfare against government-allied forces occupying Tigray, the TPLF recaptured the capital of Mekelle in June 2021, and vowed to continue fighting, saying they would conduct offensives into Eritrea and Amhara if necessary. Starting in July, the TPLF launched attacks into the Amhara and Afar Regions; by November, they joined forces with the Oromo Liberation Army (OLA), launching an offensive with the eventual goal of taking Addis Ababa and overthrowing the federal government.

Following a counter-offensive that prevented this from occurring, the TPLF withdrew their forces from Amhara and Afar on 20 December 2021. In response to the Tigrayan withdrawal, the federal government made reassurances that the Ethiopian National Defense Force (ENDF) would not advance further into Tigray than they already had, as, according to Government Communication Service minister Legesse Tulu, "the [TPLF]’s desire and ability [to engage in war] is severely destroyed."

==== Peace process ====
The airstrike took place during a roughly three-month period between the withdrawal of TPLF troops in December 2021, and the beginning of a ceasefire on 24 March 2022.

On 7 January, before the airstrike occurred, Ethiopia released a number of political prisoners, some of them being from the TPLF, including co-founder Sebhat Nega and former Tigray Region president Abay Weldu. The Ethiopian government publicly expressed a desire for peace, with Prime Minister Abiy Ahmed stating he was looking for an "all-inclusive national dialogue", and that "One of the moral obligations of a victor is mercy." In a statement made to Al Jazeera English after the airstrike, Teklay Gebremichael of Tghat argued that this decision was "a ruse" intended to mollify international observers, claiming that Abiy used the language of peace and negotiation while continuing to operate as usual.

==== Mass displacement ====
In the aftermath of the Mai Kadra massacre, Tigrayan civilians became the target of systemic, coordinated reprisals by Ethiopian, Amhara and Eritrean forces. By the end of November 2020, Amhara regional forces took control of Tigray's Western Zone, and proceeded to commit human rights violations against the civilian population, including the forced expulsion of roughly 1.2 million people from the area by December 2021.

The IDP camp in Dedebit was established in November 2021; by the end of the month, 3,463 displaced persons were officially recorded to be staying at the town. On 15 December, around 29,000 IDPs from the Western Zone went to North Western Tigray, of which 4,000 had arrived to Dedebit. According to aid workers, many of the IDPs in the camp were women and children. In the days immediately before the airstrike, some camp residents noticed that a drone was circling around the town.

== Airstrike ==
Map of Dedebit Elementary School. The airstrikes are numbered in the order they were launched. (Note: Legend: School buildings Tents Bombing locations Trees Other buildings Road)

Between 7–14 January, the ETAF conducted a campaign of airstrikes and bombardments on Tigrayan settlements, which left at least 108 people dead and 75 injured overall. The deadliest of these airstrikes was launched at the makeshift IDP camp at Dedebit Elementary School on 7 January; it happened late at night, at some point between 11:00pm–12:00am (EAT).

An armed drone dropped three laser-guided bombs at the camp: the first bomb struck the main school building, creating a hole in the roof and killing most within the blast range; the second one was dropped near the main gate out of the school compound, killing even more people as they were attempting to escape; a third bomb landed northeast of where the first one was dropped. This third bombing was not reported to have caused casualties. One survivor recalled being woken up suddenly by the sounds of the airstrike, at first believing that "fighting had broken out in the camp". Upon seeing the dismembered bodies of those hit by the bombs, he "realized this wasn't fighting."

Overall, the airstrike killed between 56 and 59 people. At least 30 to 46 others were injured, but a Mekelle hospital official claimed this number may have been as high as 126. At least 53 people were killed immediately by the bombs, 15 of them children (the youngest being a one-year-old baby); all were former residents of Humera, Western Tigray. Three others who initially survived the attack later died of their injuries at Shire Suhul General Hospital. One survivor stated that the airstrike had killed three families. Survivors and aid workers noted it was difficult to establish the exact number of people killed, as the bombs had caused some to be "burned to ash" or blown apart, with one saying that "bodies were fragmented like leaves"; human flesh was seen hanging from trees near the blast zones.

=== Investigations ===
Investigators from both Human Rights Watch and the UN found no evidence of Dedebit being used for military purposes, and survivors of the attack "unanimous[ly]" told investigators that they had not seen soldiers or military equipment near the camp.

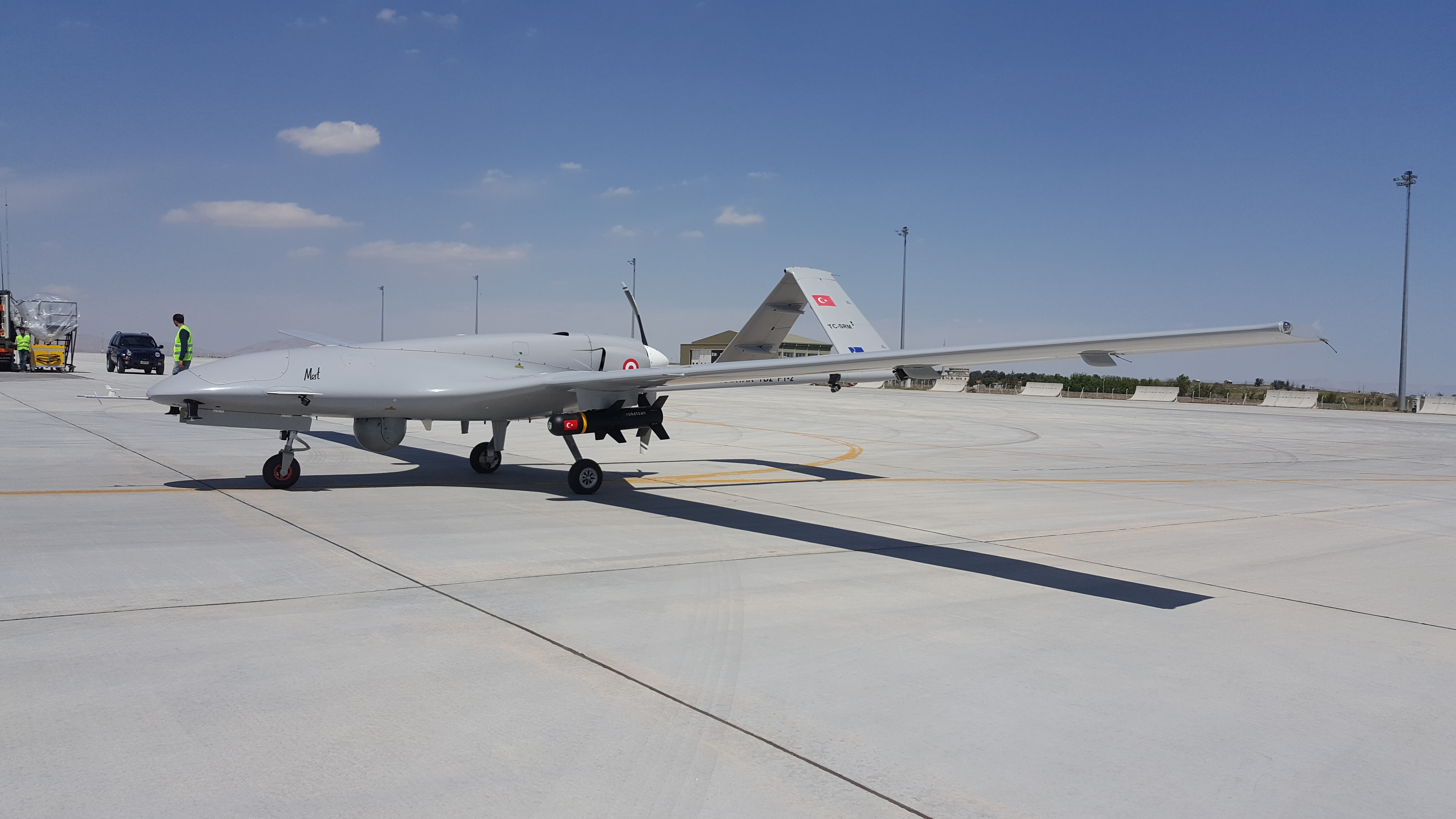
Bayraktar TB2 loaded with MAM-Ls, similar to the one used in the airstrike.

The drone used by the ETAF may have been purchased from Turkey, as the munitions used in the attack were MAM-Ls (Turkish: Mini Akıllı Mühimmat, lit. 'smart micro munition'), which were used exclusively for the Turkish Baykar Bayraktar TB2. At the time the airstrike had occurred, the ENDF was also the only military force in the war that was using armed drones. Open-source investigators and news research teams determined that Bahir Dar Airport in the Amhara Region was the most likely takeoff location. The airport – located around 278 km (173 mi) south of Dedebit – was the only base that was close enough for a TB2 to both launch MAM-L bombs and make a return trip back.

On 24 March 2022, Human Rights Watch requested the Ethiopian government to investigate the airstrike, describing it as a "likely" war crime. UN investigators from the International Commission of Human Rights Experts on Ethiopia (ICHREE) came to a similar conclusion in September the same year, stating that they had "reasonable grounds to believe that the ETAF committed war crimes," among them being the airstrike on Dedebit. The ICHREE made note of the "surgical nature" of MAM-L munitions (which allowed those operating the drones "real-time surveillance" of who and what they were targeting), as well as the locations of where the first and second bombs were dropped. The commission stated that the Ethiopian military had "violated the principles of precaution and proportionality" and "intentionally directed an attack against civilians".

== Aftermath ==
Surviving camp residents spent the rest of the night in fields outside the school grounds. Footage of the airstrike's aftermath was recorded in videos by Tigrai TV, a TPLF-affiliated media outlet. A priest is seen sprinkling holy water on the dead, while survivors audibly mourn over them. Those killed by the attacks were later buried in a mass grave near the town.

Due to security concerns created by the airstrike, humanitarian aid agencies suspended their operations in the area surrounding the town on 9 January 2022. For similar reasons, the UN's Office for the Coordination of Humanitarian Affairs (OCHA) stated, on 20 January, that 5,000 IDPs from Dedebit were relocated to Selekleka.

=== Reactions ===
TPLF spokesperson Getachew Reda condemned the strike, calling it "Another callous drone attack by Abiy Ahmed", and expressed skepticism towards the prime minister's calls for peace. On 9 January, the Tigray External Affairs Office released a statement condemning the airstrike, saying that it "encapsulates the Abiy regime's disdain for international law", and called on the international community to hold federal-allied forces accountable for their actions.

In the aftermath of the 7–14 January airstrike campaign, UN Secretary-General António Guterres said he was "heartbroken by the suffering of the Ethiopian people," and urged for a ceasefire. Spokesperson for the Office of the United Nations High Commissioner for Human Rights (OHCHR), Liz Throssell, also condemned the campaign, and drew particular attention to the bombing of Dedebit. She further stated that "Failure to respect the principles of distinction and proportionality could amount to war crimes". European Union High Representative Josep Borrell was critical of the strike, saying that, while the release of political prisoners was a positive development, "All parties must seize the moment to swiftly end the conflict and enter into dialogue." the United States Bureau of African Affairs also condemned the bombings, calling them "unacceptable", and urged for both a ceasefire and unrestricted humanitarian aid into affected areas of the country.

The Turkish government did not comment on the airstrike, and did not response to requests from journalists to speak about it. The Ethiopian government also said very little about the attacks, being similarly unresponsive to questions. In a statement to the BBC on 30 January 2022, Legesse Tulu acknowledged that Ethiopia was using armed drones, but would "not say where" they were obtained, and claimed that they were not targeting civilians with drone strikes.

== See also ==
- Togoga airstrike (June 2021)
- Mekelle kindergarten airstrike (August 2022)
- Adi Daero school airstrike (October 2022), another airstrike on a school-turned-IDP camp later the same year

Similar international events:

- 1991 Amiriyah shelter bombing in Iraq
- 2019 Hass refugee camp bombing in Syria
- Attacks on Jabalia refugee camp (2023–present) in the Gaza Strip
  - 31 October 2023 Jabalia refugee camp airstrike
- 2023 Laiza massacre in Myanmar, caused by an airstrike launched at an IDP camp
