= 2022 North Shewa clashes =

Armed conflict as part of OLA insurgency in Ethiopia

- Part of OLA insurgency
Date	29 March – 19 April 2022
Location	North Shewa, Oromia Zone, Amhara Region and Oromia Region, Ethiopia
Result	Indecisive

Belligerents
Fano	Oromo Liberation Army	ENDF: Amhara Special Forces; Oromia Special Forces

Casualties and losses
Unknown	28+ killed 15+ injured	3 killed
- 38+ civilians killed, 82+ injured 3,000 displaced

The 2022 North Shewa clashes were a series of clashes that broke out between ethnic Amhara Fano militiamen, the Oromo Liberation Army, and the Ethiopian National Defence Forces in the North Shewa zone in the Oromia region and the Oromia Zone in the Amhara region, which resulted in dozens of people killed and thousands displaced.

== Background ==
The Oromia Zone in the Amhara region was created in the 1990s after pressure on the Ethiopian government by Oromo rights groups, who were a majority in the small part of Amhara region bordering Oromia. In the North Shewa Zone of Oromia, where Amharas are a sizeable minority, conflict has been rife across the two sides between Oromo and Amhara fighting for regional dominance. During the Tigray War, Fano developed as an Amhara militia aiding the Ethiopian government against the Tigray People's Liberation Front, and claiming historical Tigrayan and Amhara lands as Amhara. Tensions between the two groups first developed in 2018, after Amhara discontent in believing the Oromo-led Prosperity Party was not adequately supporting Amhara rights in North Shewa. In 2021, four clashes were reported in Oromia Zone between Fano and the Oromo Liberation Army, colloquially known as OLF-Shene. Large bouts of violence occurred in Ataye between the OLA and Amhara forces.

== Conflict ==
The conflict began on 29 March, when alleged Fano militants attacked Oromo militants and policemen in the Minjar Shenkora district. The attackers then made their way through the towns of Korke and Awra Godana, which are disputed between North Shewa and East Shewa in Oromia. In the attacks, 28 Oromo militants were killed, and 15 were injured. The Korke and Awera Godana areas were then put under Ethiopian government control. Amhara regional authorities and rights groups claimed that the Minjar Shenkora ambush occurred after OLA militants shot and killed an Ethiopian police officer. The Amhara Association of America also accused OLA of capturing Awra Godana. The conflict was later resolved following mediation between local Amhara and Oromo leaders.

The second bout of clashes broke out on 9 April on the borders of Oromia Special Zone and North Shewa. While both sides traded blame for who initiated the attacks, fighting occurred in the villages of Wesen Kurkur, Mute Facha, and Tikure Wadawo in Jilye Tumuga district of the Oromia Zone. In North Shewa Zone of the Amhara region, fighting occurred in Zembo, Addis Alem, and Negoso in the Efratana Gidem district and Kewet in Menze Mama Midir district. 20 people were killed and 48 were injured as a result of the fighting. The clashes didn't end until April 12, and by then, 3,000 residents had been displaced and 125 houses had been burned. The village of Molele in Zembo kebele suffered the worst damage, and during operations by the Ethiopian Army (ENDF) to suppress the clashes and restore control over the road leading to Addis Ababa, three Amhara Special Forces soldiers were killed. The Efratana Gidem district administrator accused the OLA, but the Jilye Tumuga district administrator accused Fano for the attacks.

On 18 April, fighting broke out near Shewa Robit and Wesen Kurkur, after Fano militants marched into the town. Ethnic Oromo residents requested support from the Ethiopian military (ENDF) while Fano fighters assumed the ENDF reinforcements would support them. Battles broke out between the ENDF and Fano. Many residents fled to the cities of Debre Birhan and Debre Sina. While the clashes ended on April 19, bodies were still being discovered in rural areas near Shewa Robit. The provisional death toll was 10 killed, 34 injured.

Ethiopian soldiers massacred eight civilians in Daye Wilincho on 23 April, for unknown reasons. Several other civilians were shot, killed, or arrested for being suspected OLA militants by Ethiopian soldiers and Oromia Special Forces. By that point, fighting between Fano, the OLF-Shene, and the ENDF had ceased.
