= ENDF National Unity Offensive =

2021 offensive as part of the Tigray War in Ethiopia

- Part of Tigray War
Date	26 November – 23 December 2021 (3 weeks and 6 days)
Location	Ethiopia
Result	Ethiopian victory: Tigrayan forces retreat back into Tigray

Belligerents
Ethiopia: Amhara; Afar	Tigray People's Liberation Front Oromo Liberation Army

Commanders and leaders
(Ethiopia) Abiy Ahmed (Ethiopia) Birhanu Jula; Yilikal Kefale Awol Arba	(Tigray Region) Tsadkan Gebretensae (Tigray Region) Tadesse Werede Tesfay

Units involved
ENDF: Ethiopian Ground Forces; ETAF; Amhara Special Forces; Fano; Afar Special Forces	Tigray Defense Forces; Oromo Liberation Army

The ENDF National Unity Offensive was a military offensive in the Tigray War launched by the Ethiopian military (ENDF) and pro-government forces to recapture territory in the Amhara and Afar regions being occupied by the Tigray Defense Forces (TDF). Gendarmerie regional forces and local militias from Afar and Amhara had mobilized thousands of fighters and joined the offensive. The ENDF and its allies were able to push TDF forces back from Debre Sina, Amhara to Alamata, Tigray (≈400 km). The Ethiopian government announced the campaign for national unity was a success and had been completed on 23 December 2021.

== Background ==
After pushing the ENDF out of Tigray in the TDF began its invasion of the neighboring Afar and Amhara regions during August 2021. The ENDF launched an operation to recapture TDF occupied land which was unsuccessful. TDF forces continued their march down the A2 highway with the goal of capturing Addis Ababa. TDF forces were able to advance to the town Debre Sina which is located ≈190 km northeast of Addis Ababa. International media began to report that the fall of Addis Ababa was imminent causing many international organizations to begin flying their employees out of the country. France, Germany, and other western nations urged their citizens to flee the country. United States Army General William Zana, commander of Camp Lemonnier, Djibouti, said the US had forces on standby to secure the American embassy should Addis fall to the TDF. Many in Ethiopia saw these statements as a violation of Ethiopian sovereignty and an attempt to cause panic in the country. In response to the statements Ethiopians and other sympathetic Africans around the world organized protests against the US across capitals of Western countries. PM Abiy Ahmed announced he would be heading to the frontline to lead the troops and defeat the TDF and OLA alliance. With its newly acquired equipment the ENDF and its allies were able to inflict heavy casualties on the TDF and halt its advance. The ENDF then began its "National Unity campaign" to expel the TDF from the Amhara and Afar regions. The Ethiopian government announced the conclusion to offensive on 23 December 2021 after forcing the TDF to retreat back to Tigray.

== Timeline ==
On 28 November 2021, ENDF and Afar forces recapture Chifra from the TDF.

On 1 December, ENDF and Amhara forces recapture the cities of Gashena, Arbit, Dubko, Molale, Mezezo, Degolo, Were Ilu, Aketsa, and Shewa Robit. ENDF and Amhara forces recapture the holy city Lalibela. The Ethiopian Air Force strikes the Tekeze Dam electrical substation. ENDF and Amhara forces recapture Mehal Meda.

On 2 December, TDF armor losses are documented during the ENDF advance. ENDF recapture Debre Sina. Large scale damage from TDF looting and sabotage in Debre Sina is reported after its one-week occupation. TDF loots a hospital in Amdework, loss of equipment leads to the death of 19 patients.

On 3 December, ENDF and Amhara forces recaptured Jewaha, Gerbe, Senbete, and Ataye. Within the span of a week of TDF confirmed armor loses include 1 T-72, 3 T-62s, 5 T-55s, and 1 Type 89. ENDF and Amhara forces recaptured Karakore, Chefa Robit, and Mehoye. ENDF and Amhara forces recapture Dawunt woreda and Kon.

On 4 December, TDF looting and destruction of Lalibela Airport documented by Ethiopian press. ENDF and Amhara forces recapture Kemise, Majete, Weledi and Rike. ENDF and Amhara forces recapture Koke Ager, Germame, Fito, Ajebar, and Tenta.

On 6 December, ENDF and Afar forces recaptured Bati. ENDF and allied forces recaptured the strategic cities of Dessie and Kombolcha.

On 8 December, the Fana Broadcasting Corporation (FBC) reported that the Dessie Referral Hospital had been looted and damaged while under TDF occupation. ENDF and allied forces recapture Wuchale, Selula, Tita, Hayk, and Bistima. ENDF and Amhara forces recaptured Goshmeda. ENDF and Amhara forces recaptured Kutaber, Wurgesa, Girana, and Idari. The Ethiopian Press Agency reported that Kombolcha General Hospital had been looted and taken out of commission by TDF. ENDF and Amhara forces recaptured Hamsuit. The UN announced that the World Food Programme (WFP) would stop distributing food in Dessie and Kombolcha because its warehouses were robbed at gunpoint by TDF. Three WFP trucks had been stolen by TDF forces and used for military purposes according to the UN.

On 9 December, ENDF and Amhara forces recaptured Istayish.

On 10 December, the Human Rights Watch reported that TDF fighters have executed unarmed civilians in multiple towns across the Amhara region.

On 12 December, TDF captured Lalibela. TDF captured Gashena.

On 17 December, ENDF and Amhara forces recaptured Mersa. A market in Alamata is hit by an airstrike resulting in civilian casualties.

On 18 December, ENDF and Amhara forces recaptured Sirinka, Woldiya, Gobiye, Hara Gebeya, Wacho, Kobo Robit, and Kobo. ENDF and Amhara forces recaptured Gashena, Hamsuit, Istayish, Ahun Tagegn, Debot, and Sanka. ENDF and Amhara forces recaptured Lalibela, Taja, Dubko, and Kulmensk.

On 19 December, TDF destroyed the Alweh Bridge between Woldiya and Kobo before retreating towards Tigray.

On 20 December, TDF destroyed second bridge south of initial bridge between Woldiya and Kobo. TDF destroyed a bridge between Haro and Dire Roka. A minibus in Mlazat, Tigray was hit by an ENDF airstrike resulting in civilian casualties.

On 21 December, ENDF and allied forces captured Rare, Waja, and Alamata.

On 22 December, ENDF and Amhara forces recaptured Sekota and the Wag Hemra Zone.

On 23 December, the Ethiopian government announced the offensive had been successful and had reached a conclusion.

== War crimes ==
During the occupation of the Afar and Amhara regions the TDF have been reported to have been responsible for mass killings and gang rapes of civilians. In the town of Nefas Mewcha alone 74 women had reported that they had been raped by TDF fighters. Amnesty International reported that the looting of hospitals by the TDF had created obstacles in the treatment of the rape victims. The rape survivors had reported suffering back pain, bloody urine, difficulty walking, anxiety and depression. In the town of Gashena the mayor had reported 53 civilians had been killed in a massacre by the TDF. The Human Rights Watch reported that in the town of Chenna Tigrayan forces summarily executed 26 civilians in 15 separate incidents over the span of five days. According to the Ministry of Justice 540 civilians across Afar and Amhara had been killed by the TDF. In the Afar region Qurans and mosques had been burned by the TDF.

While Afar and Amhara regions were under TDF occupation the ENDF launched airstrikes in Tigray that resulted in civilian deaths. In Alamata an ENDF airstrike hit a marketplace resulting in the deaths of 28 civilians. In Mlazat an ENDF airstrike hit a minibus resulting in multiple civilian deaths.

== See also ==
- 4 November Northern Command attacks
- Battle of Humera
- Asmara rocket attacks
- Mekelle offensive
- Operation Alula
- 2021 Tigray offensive
- TDF–OLA joint offensive
