= Koree Nageenyaa =

Secret committee of the Ethiopian government

- ኮሬ ነጌኛ

Agency overview
- Formed: 2018; 8 years ago
- Jurisdiction: Ethiopia (mainly Oromia)
- Status: Operating
- Agency executive: Shimelis Abdisa, Chief Staff

The Koree Nageenyaa (Amharic: ኮሬ ነጌኛ), translated from Oromo as Security Committee (የደህንነት ኮሚቴ), is a secretive Ethiopian government agency allegedly responsible for orchestrating executions within Ethiopia and more specifically in the regional state of Oromia. The Koree Nageenyaa is believed to be composed of high-ranking individuals in Oromia, the biggest and most densely populated region in Ethiopia, and has purportedly issued directives for unlawful detentions and extrajudicial killings with the aim of suppressing an uprising.

== Leadership and structure ==
The head of the Koree Nageenyaa is Shimelis Abdisa, president of Oromia. Other members include Fekadu Tessema of the Prosperity Party in Oromia, Ararsa Merdasa, head of security for Oromia, and "half a dozen other local political and security officials". Prosperity Party premises are used for meetings of the Koree Nageenyaa.

== Purposes ==
The Koree Nageenyaa was initially established with objectives of tackling increasing security concerns in Oromia. However, the committee exceeded its intended scope by unlawfully intervening in the justice system, resulting in widespread human rights abuses. Shimelis Abdisa, the leader of the Koree Nagenyaa and the president of regional state of Oromia stated ''Koree Nageenyaa would direct operations against enemy elements and enemy cells.''

== Administrative procedures ==
According to a former judge of the Oromia Supreme Court, the procedures used by the agency are that "the Koree Nageenya sits down and decides that a person needs to be detained. Then they go and arrest them without warrant or investigation or due process."

== Operations ==
This covert organization reportedly commenced its operations in the months following the assumption of power by Prime Minister Abiy Ahmed in 2018. The committee, allegedly led by the Koree Nageenyaa, has been linked to numerous killings, with reports attributing dozens of deaths to its orders. Additionally, the committee's directives are said to have resulted in hundreds of arrests. Notably, one of the incidents attributed to the committee is a massacre of 14 shepherds(Karrayyuu Community Leaders) in Oromia in 2021, which the government had previously attributed to fighters from the Oromo Liberation Army (OLA).

== Conspiracies ==
In early 2024, Taye Dendea, a close ally of Abiy Ahmed and the Minister of the Ministry of Peace, was compelled to step down from his position after he voiced his objection to the Ethiopian government's refusal to allow freedom of protest in the capital city, Addis Ababa. Expressing his disappointment with Abiy Ahmed's decision to dismiss him from the cabinet, Taye Dendea took to Twitter and described Abiy Ahmed as an individual responsible for numerous civilian casualties and the cruelest person to ever exist. Political analysts based in Addis Ababa claimed that Taye Dendea was referring to Abiy Ahmed's involvement in the activities of the Koree Nageenyaa.

Bate Urgessa, an influential Ethiopian opposition leader was fatally shot and discovered on the roadside in his hometown of Meki, located in the volatile Oromia region on 10 April 2024. Before his brutal killing Bate was detained and has been in jail on several occasion due to his political stand. Though government bodies claimed the Bate's killing was associated with family disputes, it is believed that Bate was killed by the Koree Nageenyaa.
