= Mekelle kindergarten airstrike =

2022 airstrike during the Tigray War

- Part of the Tigray War
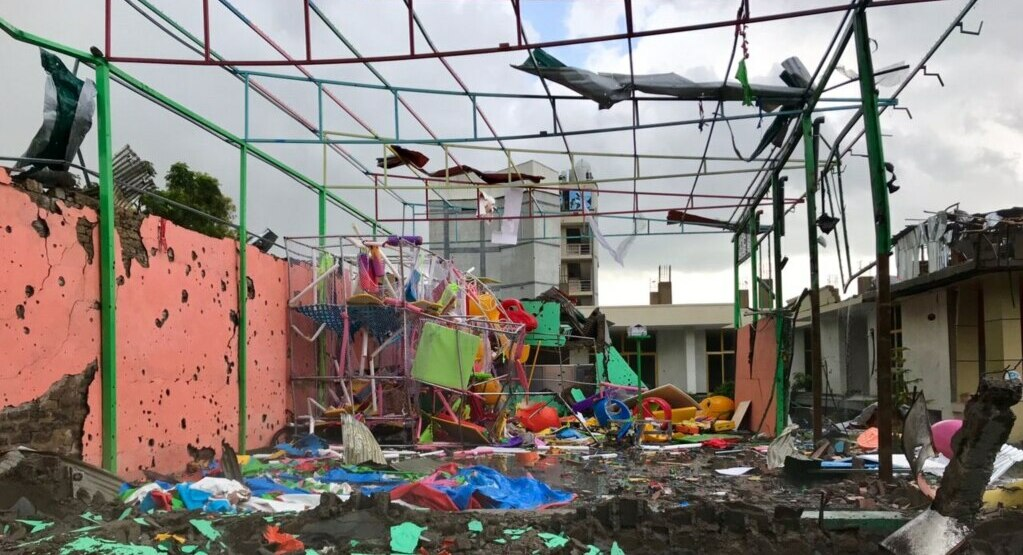
- Location: RES Kids Paradise kindergarten, Mekelle, Tigray, Ethiopia
- Date: August 26, 2022; 12:40pm (EAT)
- Deaths: 7 killed
- Injuries: 14 injured
- Perpetrators: Ethiopian Air Force (per TPLF and UNICEF)

On August 26, 2022, an airstrike allegedly from the Ethiopian National Defense Force hit a kindergarten in Tigrayan capital of Mekelle, killing seven people including two children.

== Prelude ==
In 2020, following years of heightened tensions between the democratic Ethiopian government, led by Abiy Ahmed, and the Tigray People's Liberation Front, the dominant party in the Tigray Region which had previously led a dictatorship in Ethiopia, clashes broke out between the TPLF and Ethiopia, beginning the Tigray War. An initial Ethiopian government offensive captured Mekelle, the Tigrayan capital, and saw the war escalate into a low-level insurgency. In 2021, a Tigrayan offensive reached the outskirts of the Ethiopian capital, but ultimately was pushed back. A ceasefire was initiated in March 2022, but by August, the peace talks began to break down. Just days before the airstrike, fighting erupted again, with both sides accusing each other of initiating.

== Airstrike ==
Following the resurgence of fighting, Ethiopian forces bombarded the Tigrayan capital of Mekelle on August 26. The airstrikes were some of the first on the capital since March. In the attack, a kindergarten was hit and destroyed, along with the nearby civilian compound. According to aid workers on the scene, the strike took place at RES Kids Paradise at around 12:40pm local time, a local kindergarten, and three loud booms rang out.

== Aftermath ==
Initially, four children were killed and two were injured. The death toll later rose to seven killed and fourteen injured, including children. Following the airstrikes and renewed clashes, humanitarian aid in Tigray region was suspended.

The Ethiopian government claimed that they had only hit places that they alleged the TPLF was manufacturing or storing arms. The head of UNICEF, Catherine Russell, issued a message condemning the airstrike and called for an "immediate cessation of hostilities."

== See also ==
- Togoga airstrike (June 2021)
- Dedebit Elementary School airstrike (January 2022)
- Adi Daero school airstrike (October 2022)
