= Abo church massacre =

Massacre in Ethiopia

- Part of the OLA insurgency
- East Welega (Ethiopia)
- Location: 10.8796°N 38.3727°E; Debos Kebele, East Welega Zone, Oromia, Ethiopia
- Date: 5 March 2021
- Target: Amhara people
- Attack type: Mass shooting
- Deaths: 29
- Injuries: several
- Perpetrators: OLA (Denied); Faqadaa Abdiisaa (OLA Claim)

On 5 March 2021, suspected Oromo Liberation Army gunmen attacked the village of Debos Kebele killing 29 civilians.

== Attack ==
On 5 March 2021, gunmen believed to be aligned with the OLA attacked the village of Debos Kebele. At Abo church, civilians had gathered to celebrate Lent. Suspected OLA soldiers then entered the town and stormed the church where they shot and killed the administrator of the church. Oromo fighters removed about 28 people from the church and then raped the women. They then took the group to a forest called Gerji where all 28 people including 21 women and 7 children were executed.

== Responsibility ==
Several witnesses claim OLA fighters carried out the massacre. The OLA soon released a statement on the attack claiming that they do not target people based on their ethnicity and that the attack was carried out by a rogue OLA splinter group led by Faqadaa Abdiisaa.
