= 2021 Gida Kiremu massacres =

Ethnic cleansing in Ethiopia; part of OLA insurgency

- Part of OLA insurgency
- Location: Gida Kiremu, East Welega Zone, Oromia, Ethiopia
- Date: 18–20 August 2021
- Target: Amhara civilians (by the OLA); Oromo civilians (by Amhara militias)
- Deaths: 210: 150 killed on 18 August by OLA; 60 killed in reprisal attacks by Amhara militias
- Perpetrators: Oromo Liberation Army (August 18 attack); Amhara Fano militias (August 19–20 attacks)

The Gida Kiremu massacres refers to a series of attacks between 18 and 20 August 2021 when the Oromo Liberation Army (OLA) targeted Amhara civilians in Gida Kiremu, Oromia Region, Ethiopia, killing over 210. The attack on 18 August killed 150 Amhara civilians, and reprisal attacks by Amhara militias killed 60 mostly-Oromo civilians the day after.

== Background ==
The Oromo Liberation Army is the military wing of the Oromo Liberation Front, which says it fights for the rights of Oromo people. After the Tigray war broke out in November 2020 between the Ethiopian government under Abiy Ahmed and the Tigray People's Liberation Front, the OLA announced an alliance with the TPLF. While the OLA insurgency was relatively minor and relegated to small rural pockets before the Tigray war, Ethiopian troops were forced to move north and leave a security vacuum in Oromia, allowing the OLA to expand in 2021. A conflict broke out in eastern Amhara Region and western Oromia between ethnic Amhara and Oromo civilians. Much of western Oromia is inhabited by Amhara civilians, leading to conflicts between Oromos over territorial disputes.

Amhara civilians stated that due to the growing OLA insurgency in 2020 and 2021, many Amharas who were born in raised in Oromia fled their families to Amhara region, and remaining Amhara civilians geared up to defend their towns from Oromo militants and launch attacks on Oromo civilians.

== Massacre ==
Prior to the massacre, Oromia Special Forces had departed from the Gida Kiremu area. News of the massacre was first reported by the Ethiopian Human Rights Commission on August 26, stating that OLA militants attacked civilians in the district of Gida Kiremu, killing Amhara civilians. The EHRC stated 150 civilians were killed in the massacre, and that 60 more were killed in "ethnic retaliation" over the following days. The OLA immediately released a statement denying responsibility for the killings, and said that the deaths were from battles between OLA militants and an Amhara militia that crossed the regional border and attacked Oromo farmers.

An Amhara resident in Gida Kiremu stated that the OLA militants came into the town armed, and that Amhara militiamen attempted to defend themselves from the incursion. The administrator of East Welega Zone, where Gida Kiremu is located, stated that the OLA initially launched an incursion into the town, which was being defended by Amhara militias. After the Amharas were overrun, the OLA began slaughtering civilians.

On the day after the August 18 massacre, Amhara militias geared up and began retaliating against Oromos, killing Oromo 60 civilians.

== Aftermath ==
The Gida Kiremu massacres were the deadliest incident in the Western Oromia conflict up to that point. Between November 25 and 29, 2022, ethnic Amhara Fano militants attacked Oromo civilians in Gida Kiremu, killing at least 50 civilians on November 25. In the attack, Fano shot at Oromia Police and civilians. They returned on November 29 and killed another 20 civilians, including a district court judge.

In September 2023, the OLA accused the Ethiopian National Defense Forces (ENDF) of killing at least 31 people in attacks on civilians in Gida Kiremu. The ENDF had replaced the Oromia Special Forces in April 2023.
