= OLA peace process =

Peace process to end the insurgency of the Oromo Liberation Army in Ethiopia

The OLA peace process are a set of negotiations, agreements and actions to end the insurgency of the Oromo Liberation Army (OLA), which split from its wing, the Oromo Liberation Front (OLF) and rebels against the Ethiopian federal government since 2018. The Oromia region has experienced prolonged conflict and instabilities first initiated by OLF with successive Ethiopian government since 1973.

After Prime Minister Abiy Ahmed came to power in 2018, OLF has ratified as a recognized political party in Ethiopia in 2019, but its wing, OLA, rejected government's summon to deal in a peace talk in August 2018, leading to OLA insurgency.

The first peace talk was held in April 2023 in Dar es Salaam, Tanzania with a failed outcome. In November 2023, a second round peace talk was held in the same place in collaboration of IGAD, without agreement. On 1 December 2024, OLA signed a peace agreement with Oromia Region President Shimelis Abdisa in Addis Ababa.

== Background ==
The Oromia Region has been experienced a protracted conflict between Oromo nationalist political factions and the government of Ethiopia. This insurgency led to the formation of Oromo Liberation Front (OLF) in that year to quest self-determination and Oromo rights. Further tensions arouse in 1980s when the Derg government began arbitrary arrests and torture Oromos supposedly belonged to OLF and supporters of civil society.

In 1992, OLF began rebelled against the Ethiopian People's Revolutionary Democratic Front (EPRDF) and Oromo People's Democratic Organization (OPDO) that caused severe human rights violations carried out by military and police forces involving mass arrests, torture, abuse and targeted assassinations. For decades, OLF has been barred by the central government from any political participation. Starting from 2006, the government conducted systematic action against the group and clashes were erupted across the region since 2015. In 2016, mass protests were sparked after the government plan to evict Oromo farmers from their land.

Since Prime Minister Abiy Ahmed came to power in April 2018, he began series reforms including releasing political prisoners and legalizing OLF party in the country. In August 2018, OLF signed peace agreement with the government, but its wing, the Oromo Liberation Army (OLA), split off from OLA and chose to rebel against the government. The federal government and Amhara groups accuse the OLA for committing atrocities against Amhara minorities in the Oromia region. A claim that the OLA regularly denies and calls for independent investigations for. The OLA instead accuses the government of those massacres stating that they were committed by a government backed militia group meant to frame the OLA. Aligned with the Tigray War, OLA launched a renewed insurgency in March 2021 that resulted over 60 deaths per month. In May 2021, the Ethiopian parliament declared OLA as a "terrorist organization" followed by successive massacre in Tole woreda and West Welega allegedly committed by OLA in fall of 2022. An eyewitness told that between 300 and 400 people of Amhara ethnicity were killed. While greater escalation of militarized situation intensified and the Oromos oppressed by this case, the government put blame on the faction of every atrocities. As such, establishing international criminal persecution is ostensibly impossible not because of the severity of situation, but also the Ethiopian government rejection to form an independent commission of inquiry.

== Process ==
The first round peace talk was held in Tanzania's capital Dar es Salaam on 23 April 2023 between the representatives of the Ethiopian government and the Oromo Liberation Army (OLA). Mediated by countries like Kenya and Norway, the discussion met generally positive reception with a hope to end decade long Oromo conflict. Many analysts including Abbas Mwalimu, a lecturer at the Tanzania Center for Foreign Relations, said they were monitoring the situation. Mwalimu convinced that the discussion should end with peace and stability, and the decision to hold the peace talk is right. According to two familiar sources, various talks and discussions directed to broader negotiations with one sources stated that the last four days discussions were "encouraging".

On 13 November, the peace talk was held for the second time in Dar es Salaam after six months failed first round discussion. OLA stated that the negotiation was delayed as a response to safety "from what it called the frontlines in Oromiya to the venue." An anonymous mediator said the talk was started last week in Tanzania's capital Dar es Salaam facilitated by IGAD. One rebel from OLA said "We remain committed to finding a peaceful political settlement." On 21 November, the negotiation unsuccessfully ended without deal. Redwan Hussein, the Prime Minister of Ethiopia national advisor blamed OLA "intransigence" for such failure. OLA accused the Ethiopian government of co-opting leadership rather than "beginning to address fundamental problems that underlie the country’s seemingly insurmountable security and political challenges".

On 1 December 2024, the Oromia Region Government and senior leaders of OLA have signed peace agreement in Addis Ababa. OLA representative Jaal Senay Negasa accepted the government request and signed with Oromia President Shimelis Abdisa.

== See also ==
- OLA insurgency
- Tigrayan peace process
- Oromo conflict
