= Taye Dendea =

Ethiopian politician

- ታዬ ደንድአ

State Minister of Peace
- In office 9 October 2021 – 11 December 2023
- Appointed by: Abiy Ahmed

Personal details
- Party: Prosperity Party
- Education: Addis Ababa University
- Occupation: Politician; activist

Taye Dendea (Amharic: ታዬ ደንድአ) is an Ethiopian politician and activist. Taye has been subjected to arbitrary detention multiple times. During Abiy Ahmed premiership, he was appointed as State Minister of Peace from 2021 to 2023.

On 12 December 2023, he was arrested by federal police and charged with terrorism for alleged unauthorized weapon possession. In mid-2024, he was charged with terrorism for his alleged connection to the Oromo Liberation Army (OLA), which was antigovernmental insurgent. In September 2024, the Federal Supreme Court denied his bait and Taye remained in custody. The court granted him a bail in December. Also in that month, he was reportedly abducted by armed men after exiting a prison gate.

== Career ==
Taye Dendea graduated at Addis Ababa University in Law. On 8 March 2018, Taye and his fellow activist Seyoum Teshome was arrested from their home and transported to Central Prison. They were released on 16 April without charged. When Prime Minister Abiy Ahmed came to power, he was supporter of Abiy's earlier reforms.

On 9 October 2021, he was appointed by Abiy as State Minister of Peace. Taye became a member of Prosperity Party. On 11 December 2023, he was removed that position and he received conveying letter reads as follows: "Thanking you for your contributions as State Minister for Peace since September 29, 2014 [October 9, 2021, G.C.], you are removed from your position as of December 1, 2016 [December 11, 2023]". The following day, he was arrested by security force. The Federal Police released a statement alleging he is "collaborating with anti-peace forces that are trying to destroy Ethiopia". On 24 April 2024, Taye was charged with terrorism for his alleged use anti-peace force and unauthorized weapon possession.

In August 2024, the Federal Police announced his arrest linked to his alleged collaboration with the Oromo Liberation Army (OLA) rebels. As of September 2024, Taye remained in custody while the Federal Supreme Court reject his bait following his acquittal on two other charges. On 2 December, the Federal Supreme Court Cassation Bench granted bail to Taye on a 20,000 Ethiopian birr according to his wife, Sintayehu Alemayehu. He was reportedly abducted by armed individuals who "wear face mask" while exiting prison gate.
