= Debre Nazret =

Municipality in Tigray Region, Ethiopia

Debre Nazret Togogwa ቶጎጓ
- Tabia
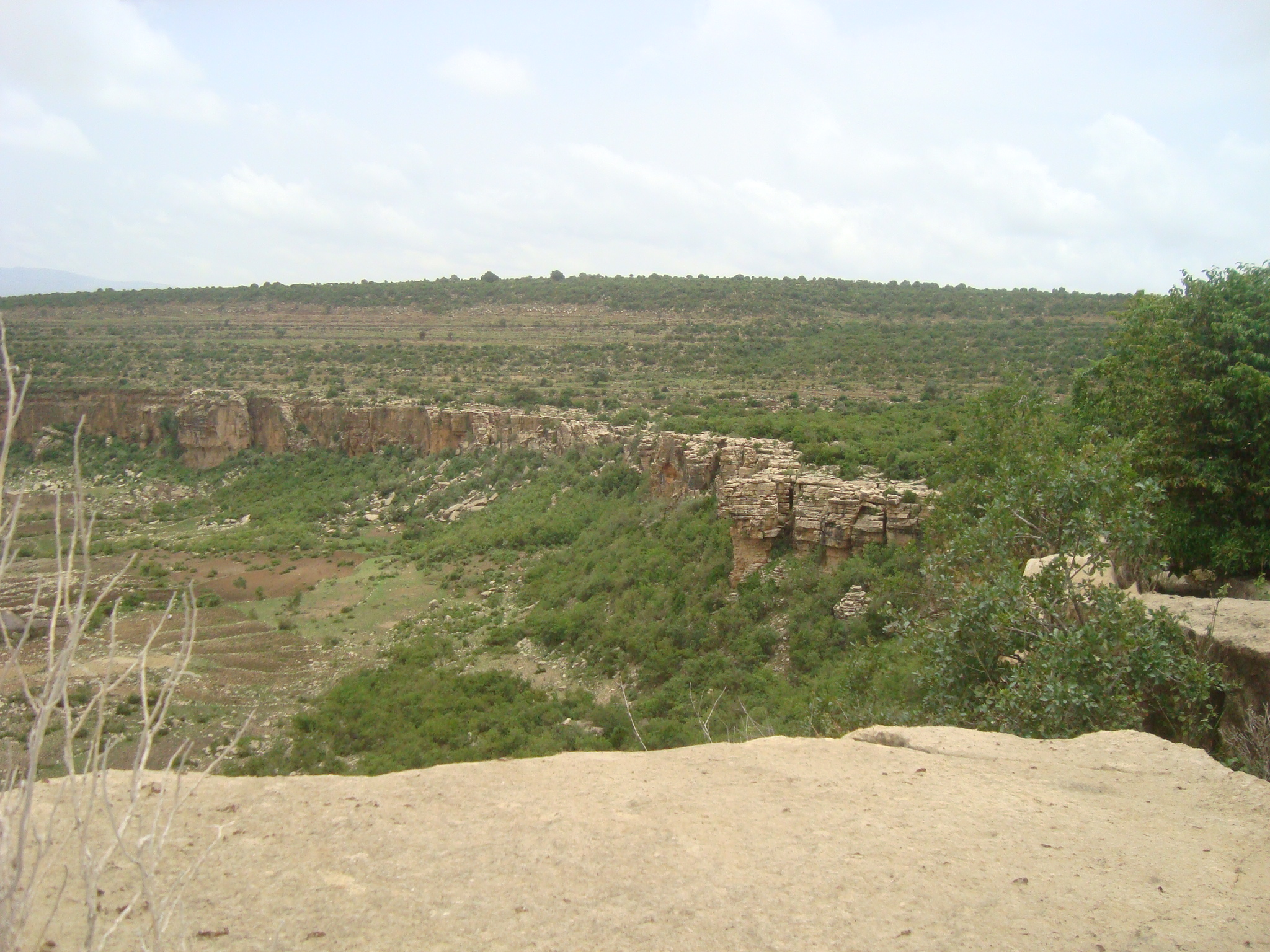
- The limestone landscape of Debre Nazret

- Location within Ethiopia
- Coordinates: 13°34′N 39°18′E
- Country: Ethiopia
- Region: Tigray
- Zone: Debub Misraqawi (Southeastern)
- Woreda: Dogu'a Tembien

Area
  - Land: 91.54 km^{2} (35.34 sq mi)
- Elevation: 2,150 m (7,050 ft)
- Time zone: UTC+3 (EAT)

Debre Nazret is a tabia or municipality in the Inderta district of the Tigray Region of Ethiopia. It belonged to Dogu'a Tembien up to January 2020. The tabia centre is in Togogwa town, located approximately 19 km to the east-southeast of Hagere Selam and 25 km to the west of Mekelle.

== History ==
The history of the tabia is strongly confounded with the history of Tembien.

Between 2018 and 2020, as part of a reform aimed to deepen and strengthen decentralisation, Tigray's woredas were reorganised, and new boundaries established. Debre Nazret was transferred from Dogu'a Tembien to Inderta. Three arguments were at play: historically it belonged to Inderta; the limestone environment (hence land management) is like Inderta; and being at mid-distance between woreda centres Hagere Selam and Mekelle, the latter was preferred as common travel is more frequent in direction of Mekelle.

During the Tigray War, on 22 June 2021, Togogwa's market was bombed by the Ethiopian Air Force and approximately 54 people were killed. According to doctors, 43 injured people were brought to the hospital in Mekelle, including a 2-year-old.

== Geography ==
The tabia occupies a wide limestone plateau at the west of the Inderta district; at the eastern and southern side it is bound by the Giba River gorge and at the west by Addi Keshofo River. The highest peak is Imba Bete Gyergis (2390 m a.s.l.) and the lowest place the junction of Addi Keshofo and Giba Rivers (1600 m a.s.l.).

=== Geology ===
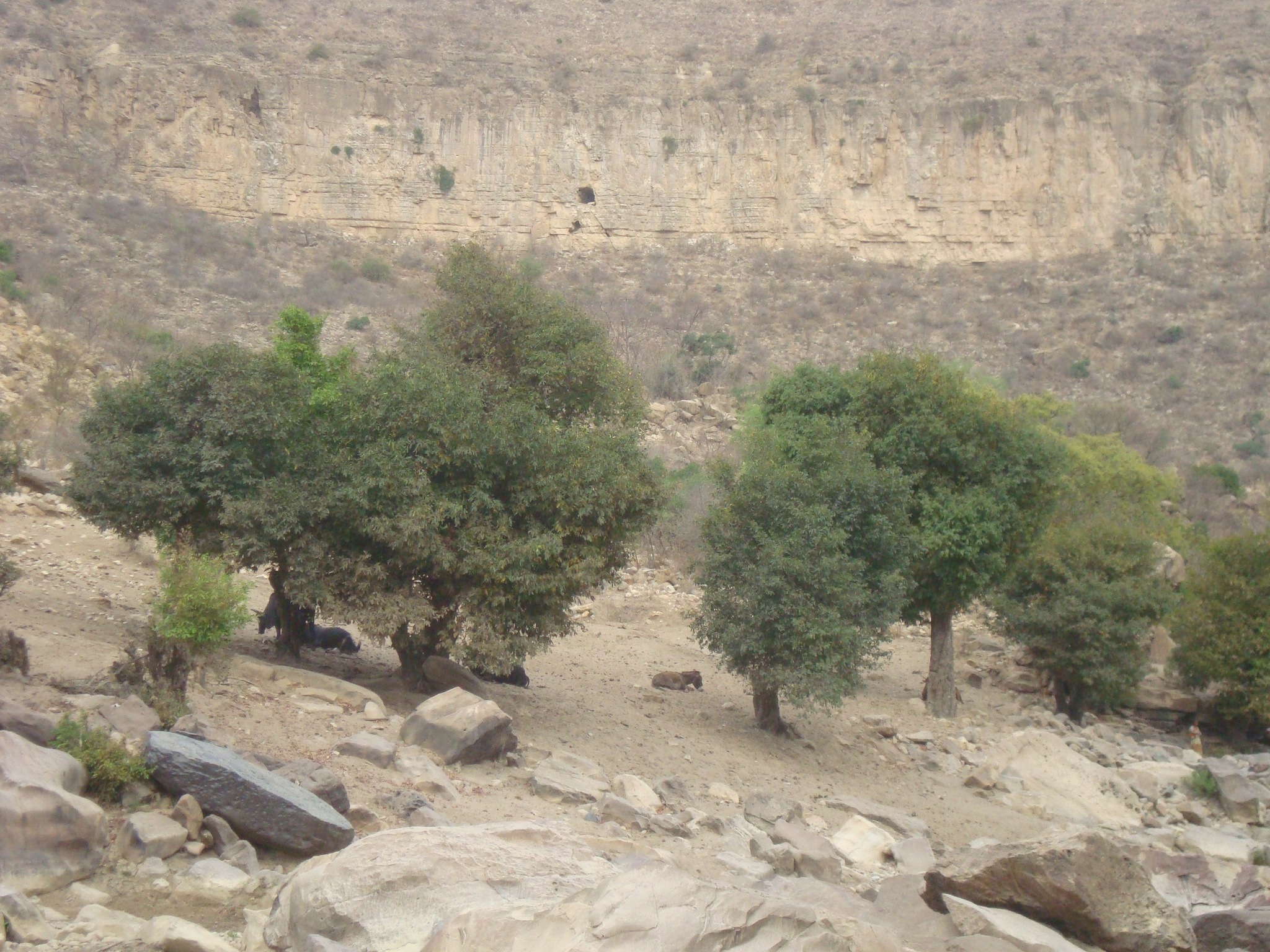
Cave entrance in a cliff face of the Giba gorge

From the higher to the lower locations, the following geological formations are present:

- Antalo Limestone
- Mekelle Dolerite
- Quaternary alluvium and freshwater tufa

=== Geomorphology and soils ===
The main geomorphic unit is the gently undulating Agula shale plateau with dolerite. Corresponding soil types are:

- Dominant soil type: stony, dark cracking clays with good natural fertility (Vertic Cambisol)
- Associated soil types
  - rock outcrops, stony and shallow soils (Lithic Leptosol)
  - red-brownish loamy soils with good natural fertility (Chromic Luvisol)
- Inclusions
  - deep, dark cracking clays on calcaric material with good fertility but poor drainage (Vertisol)

=== Springs ===
As there are no permanent rivers, the presence of springs is of utmost importance for the local people. For instance, in Kolal, the spring is so poor that every family may fetch only 20 litres of water every two days. If they need more water they must go down to Giba River. The following are the most important springs in the tabia:

- May Kebakebo in Mi'am Atali
- Ruba Minchi in Mi'am Atali
- May Togogwa in Togogwa
- May Bilbil in Giba River (the strong spring is inside the river bed)

May Kebakebo and May Togogwa directly feed Inda Anbesa River

=== Reservoirs ===
In this area with rains that last only for a couple of months per year, reservoirs of different sizes allow harvesting runoff from the rainy season for further use in the dry season.

- Traditional surface water harvesting ponds, particularly in places without permanent springs, called rahaya
- Horoyo, household ponds, recently constructed through campaigns

=== Vegetation and exclosures ===
The tabia holds several exclosures, areas that are set aside for regreening. Wood harvesting and livestock range are not allowed there. Besides effects on biodiversity, water infiltration, protection from flooding, sediment deposition, carbon sequestration, people commonly have economic benefits from these exclosures through grass harvesting, beekeeping and other non-timber forest products. The local inhabitants also consider it as "land set aside for future generations". In this tabia, some exclosures are managed by the EthioTrees project. They have as an additional benefit that the villagers receive carbon credits for the sequestered CO_{2}, as part of a carbon offset programme. The revenues are then reinvested in the villages, according to the priorities of the communities; it may be for an additional class in the village school, a water pond, or conservation in the exclosures. The following exclosures are managed by the Ethiotrees project in Debre Nazret:

- Mi'am Atali (exclosure), near the homonymous village (76.75 ha)
- Togogwa (exclosure), near the homonymous small town (108.11 ha)

=== Livelihood ===
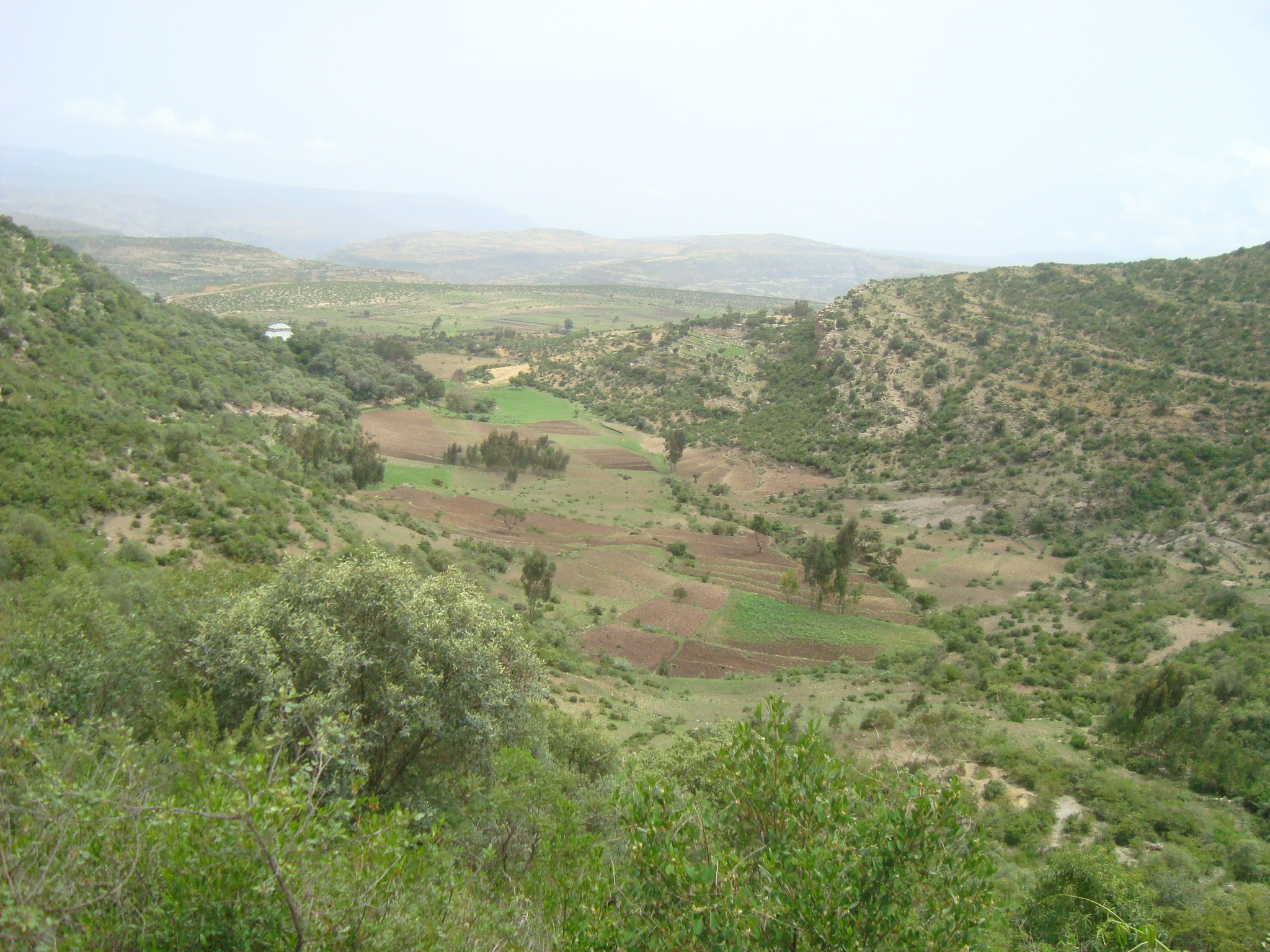
Stabilised gully in Mishlam

The population lives essentially from crop farming, supplemented with off-season work in nearby towns. The land is dominated by farmlands which are clearly demarcated and are cropped every year. Hence the agricultural system is a permanent upland farming system. Additionally many steep slopes are currently being reforested, which led to decreased soil erosion and stabilisation of gullies. In the villages of Addi Reget and Kayeh Guila, the youngsters will go to the deep gorge of Giba river to harvest incense from Boswellia papyrifera trees.

=== Population ===
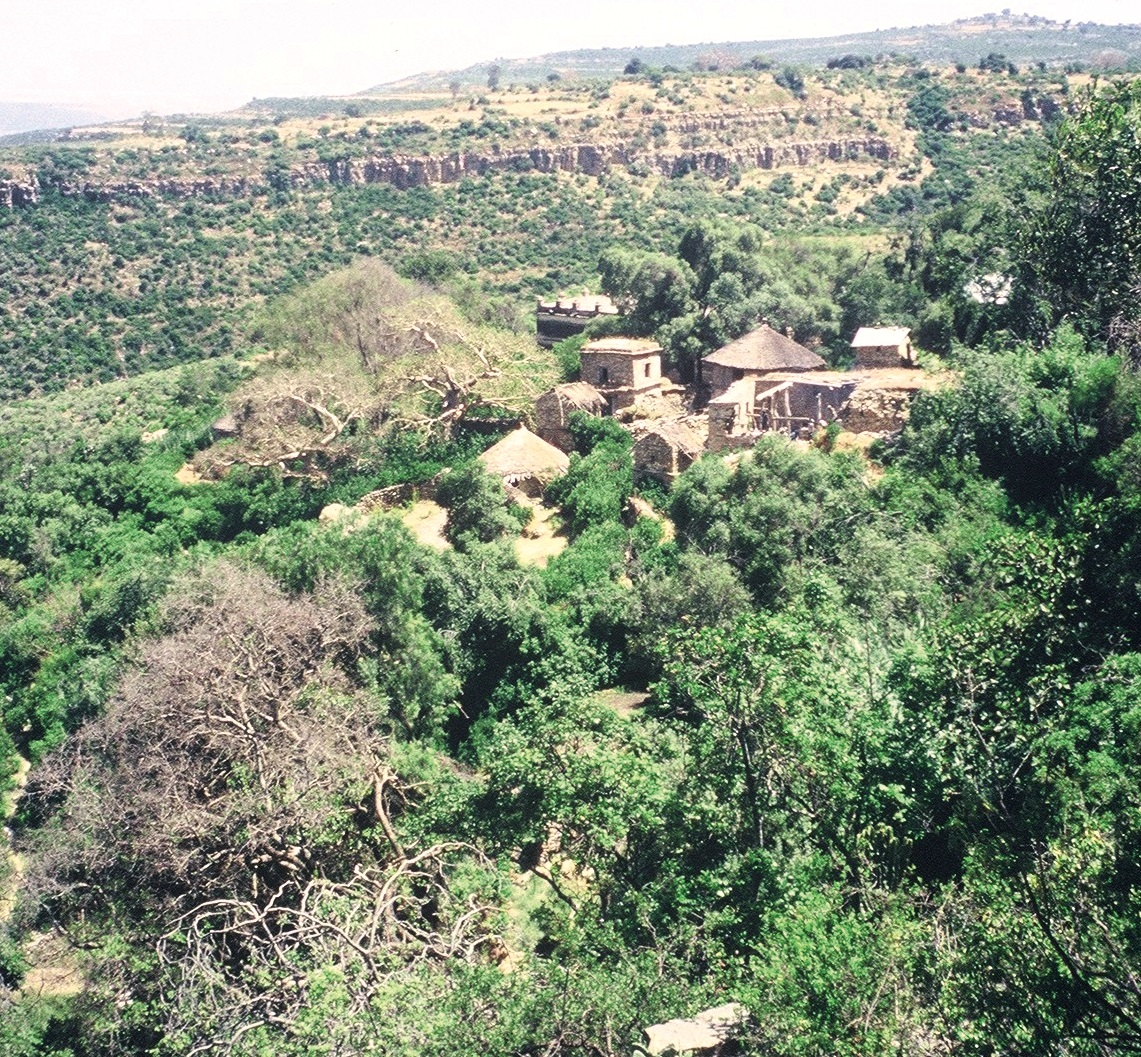
Togogwa Yohannes (St. John) monastery

The tabia centre Togogwa holds a few administrative offices, a health post, a primary and secondary school, and some small shops. Tuesday is the market day. There are a few more primary schools across the tabia. The main other populated places are:

- Mishlam
- Addi Reget
- Kayeh Guila
- Mihred Gobay
- Qaliqil
- Tahtay Kolal

- La'ilay Kolal
- Addi Beles
- Addi Kashi
- Halawa
- Mi'am Atali
- Micheto

=== Religion and churches ===
Most inhabitants are Orthodox Christians. The following churches are located in the tabia:

- Yohannes monastery
- Teklehaymanot
- Mich'eto Maryam
- Kolal Est'ifanos

- Mishlam Mika'el
- Kayeh Guila Giyergis
- Qalaqil Abune Ayezgi

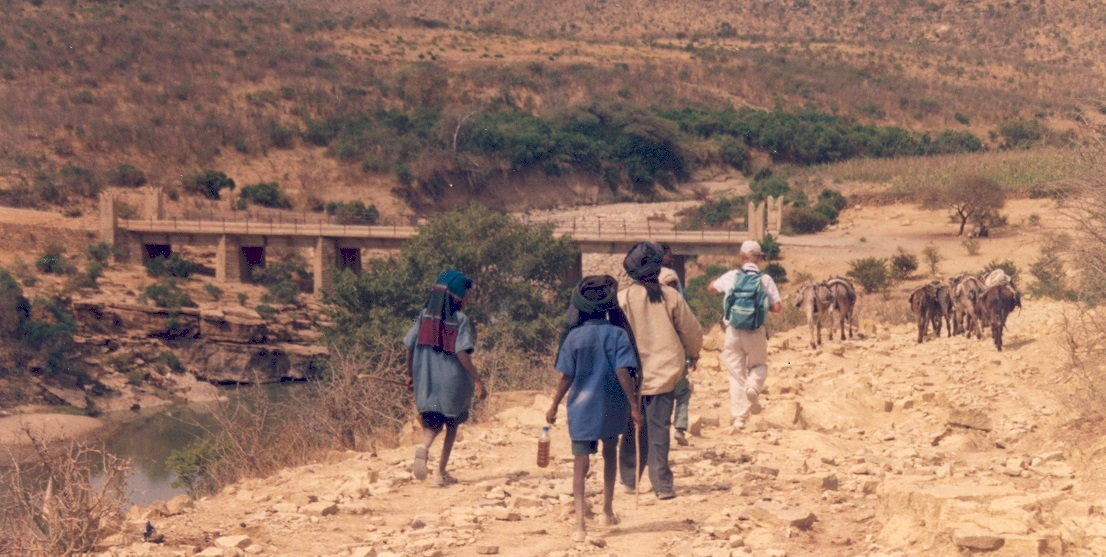
Bridge on Giba river at the east of Debre Nazret

== Schools ==
Almost all children of the tabia are schooled, though in some schools there is lack of classrooms, directly related to the large intake in primary schools over the last decades. Schools in the tabia include Togogwa High School and Kolal school.

== Roads and communication ==
In the 1960s, a road was built from Mekelle through Togogwa to Hagere Selam and on to Abiy Addi. This involved building a bridge over Giba River; the bridge stands strong nowadays, but the road is largely disused. Yet the segment on the plateau that links Togogwa to the main road Mekelle – Hagere Selam – Abiy Addi. There are regular minibus services to Mekelle and Hagere Selam.

== Tourism ==
Its mountainous nature and proximity to Mekelle makes the tabia fit for tourism.

=== Touristic attractions ===
- Yohannes monastery
- Giba gorge

=== Geotouristic sites ===
The high variability of geological formations and the rugged topography invites for geological and geographic tourism or "geotourism". Geosites in the tabia include:

- Peak of Imba Bete Giyergis
- May Bilbil resurgence

=== Birdwatching ===
Birdwatching (for the species, see the main Dogu'a Tembien page) can be done particularly in exclosures and forests. The following bird-watching sites have been inventoried in the tabia and mapped.

- Yohannes monastery forest
- Kolal church forest
- Mishlam church and slope forests

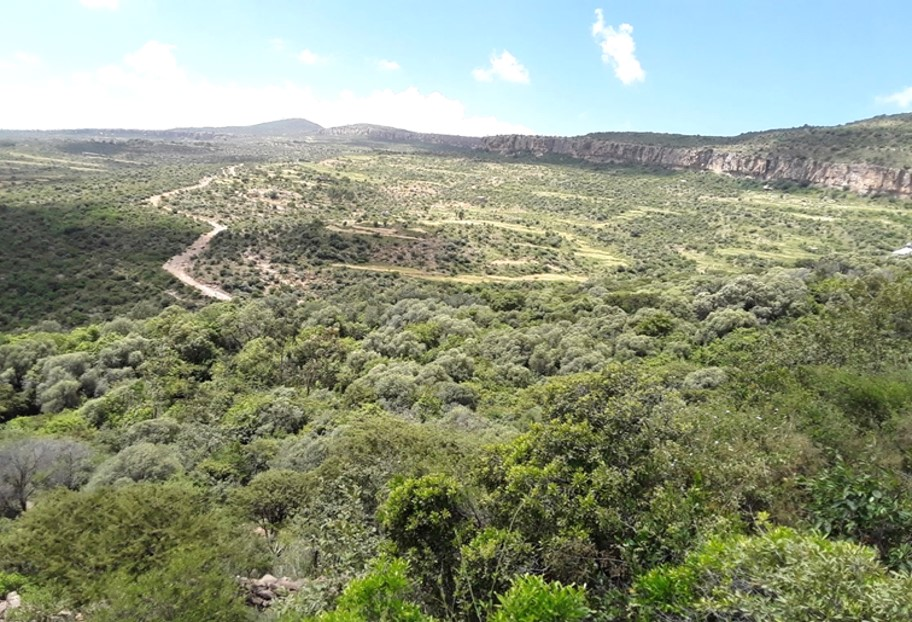
Along trek 22

=== Trekking routes ===
Trekking routes have been established in this tabia. The tracks are not marked on the ground but can be followed using downloaded .GPX files.

- Trek 18, from the old bridge on Giba River to Addi Lihtsi across the southern part of Debre Nazret
- Trek 22, from the old bridge to Togogwa
- Trek 15, from Togogwa to the southwest (Addi Lihtsi)
- Trek 16, from Togogwa to the west (Rubaksa)
- Trek 17, from Togogwa to the north (Mizane Birhan)

=== Inda Siwa, the local beer houses ===
In the main villages, there are traditional beer houses (Inda Siwa), often in unique settings, which are a good place for resting and chatting with the local people. Most renown in the tabia are

- Gebrisu Tsegay at Togogwa
- Tsega Assefa at Togogwa
- Tinsu'i Kiros at Togogwa

=== Accommodation and facilities ===
The facilities are very basic. One may be invited to spend the night in a rural homestead or ask permission to pitch a tent. There are basic hotels in Togogwa, essentially to host pilgrims on their way to the Dabba Hadera monastery. Better hotels are available in Hagere Selam and Mekelle.

== More detailed information ==
For more details on environment, agriculture, rural sociology, hydrology, ecology, culture, etc., see the overall page on the Dogu'a Tembien district.
