= TDF–OLA joint offensive =

2021 military campaign into Ethiopia as part of the Tigray War

- Part of the Tigray War and OLA insurgency
Date	31 October – 1 December 2021
Location	Ethiopia
Result	Rebel failure to advance on Addis Ababa; Subsequent government counter-offensive

Belligerents
Ethiopia	UFEFCF: Tigray People's Liberation Front; Oromo Liberation Army

Commanders and leaders
(Ethiopia) Abiy Ahmed	(Tigray Region) Tsadkan Gebretensae

Units involved
(Ethiopia) Ethiopian National Defense Force; Fano	Tigray Defense Forces; Oromo Liberation Army

Strength
Unknown	Unknown

Casualties and losses
Unknown	Unknown

The TDF–OLA joint offensive was a rebel offensive in the Tigray War and the OLA insurgency starting in late October 2021 launched by a joint rebel coalition of the Tigray Defense Forces (TDF) and Oromo Liberation Army (OLA) against the Ethiopian National Defense Forces (ENDF) and the Ethiopian government. The TDF and OLA took control of several towns south of the Amhara Region in the direction of the Ethiopian capital Addis Ababa in late October and early November. During 20–23 December, the TDF withdrew from Amhara and Afar and the ENDF retook control. Federal authorities stated that the ENDF ground forces would not enter Tigray.

Claims of war crimes included that of the TDF extrajudicially executing 100 youths in Kombolcha, according to federal authorities.

== Background ==
The Tigray War started with the November 2020 Northern Command attacks by the Tigray Special Forces against the Northern Command of the Ethiopian National Defense Force (ENDF), and continued with the ENDF’s special forces in the Amhara Region and Eritrean Defence Forces (EDF) fighting against Tigrayan forces. All forces carried out numerous war crimes in addition to military battles. By early October 2021, the TDF had regained control of much of the Tigray Region and parts of the Amhara Region, while Ethiopian federal authorities maintained a blockade against humanitarian aid to the Tigray Region, which Mark Lowcock, former head of the United Nations Office for the Coordination of Humanitarian Affairs (OCHA), viewed as a deliberate aim of "starv[ing] the population either into subjugation or out of existence". In mid-October, the ENDF launched a new military offensive against the TDF, aiming to retake control of the Tigray Region and the TDF-controlled parts of the Amhara Region.

By 1 November 2021, the long-running Oromo conflict had led to the Oromo Liberation Army (OLA) claiming to have taken military control of "several towns in western, central, and southern Oromia".

== Fall of Dessie and Kombolcha ==
In the few days leading to 2 November, the TDF took control of Dessie and Kombolcha. The New York Times saw the event as strategically significant, describing the two towns as being "strategically located ... on a highway running from north to south that has become the spine of a war that could determine the future of Ethiopia."

OLA claimed to have taken control of Kamisee on 31 October. The TDF and OLA confirmed a military alliance against the federal forces. The military actions of the TDF-OLA coalition were seen by the federal authorities as a threat to Addis Ababa, the capital of Ethiopia. On 5 November, the TDF and OLA announced a wider coalition, which included seven smaller groups, called the United Front of Ethiopian Federalist and Confederalist Forces.

The EDF, which had strongly supported the ENDF in earlier phases of the Tigray War, appeared to be absent from late October/early November fighting. According to French historian and Horn of Africa expert Gérard Prunier, this is because the bulk of the Eritrean army in Tigray was defending the border with Sudan, in order to prevent Tigrayan rebels from potentially being supplied by Egypt, an opponent to Abiy Ahmed's government, as well as protecting Eritrea's own border with Tigray, thus leaving the defense of Addis Ababa down mostly to Amhara militias in the face of heavy losses sustained by Ethiopia's federal army. The ENDF command and control structure was described as having "collapsed" by Tigrayan and Western officials.

== Mid-late November ==
On 16 November, the TDF claimed to have taken control of Ataye and Senbete in Oromia Zone in Amhara Region. This area had been the site of clashes between ethnic Oromos and Amharas in the previous months. On 19 November, the rebels were trying to take control of Shewa Robit, and claimed control on 22 November. On 25 November, the TDF was approaching Debre Sina and federal prime minister Abiy Ahmed announced that he would travel to the battlefront. He arrived at an unstated location on the battlefront on 23 November according to a spokesperson. The rebels aimed to cut off a supply line to Djibouti.

By 28 November, Afar Special Forces regained control of Chifra. There were "dead bodies everywhere in the streets" and shops and mosques were destroyed. Residents fled and Chifra became a base for the Afar forces.

According to Sveriges Radio, by late November, OLA had "surrounded" Addis Ababa from the west, south and south-east, and was in coalition with the TDF in the north-east.

== December: ENDF counter offensive ==
The Prime Minister of Ethiopia, Abiy Ahmed, announced that he would “mobilize to the front to lead the defense forces” in person in a statement posted on social media on 22 November, and encouraged Ethiopians to “rise up for [their] country”. Since then, the ENDF has achieved major territorial gains, including the recapture of Dessie and Kombolcha from the TPLF. On 13 December, the Ethiopian government claimed that their forces have controlled the main road from Woldia to Mekelle, while TPLF forces are still in control of Woldia. On 18 December, the ENDF announced that they have liberated Woldia from the TPLF. The following day on 19 December, the Deputy Prime Minister of Ethiopia, Demeke Mekonnen, visited the tourist attraction city of Lalibela, disproving the claim of the TPLF that they have controlled the city. On 20 December, Getachew Reda, the spokesman of the TPLF, announced that the TPLF was withdrawing from the Amhara and Afar regions and retreating to Tigray, saying: "We decided to withdraw from these areas to Tigray. We want to open the door to humanitarian aid." On 23 December, the Ethiopian government announced that the ENDF ground forces would not enter Tigray.

== War crimes ==
The Ethiopian authorities stated that the TDF had extrajudicially killed 100 youths in Kombolcha.

=== Predictions ===
In late November 2021, a group of 34 non-governmental organizations and 31 individuals, calling themselves African Citizens; Helen Clark (British politician), Michael Lapsley and David Alton; and Genocide Watch predicted that a genocide, in which Tigrayan and Oromo internees and Amharas are massacred, could result from the offensive. African Citizens saw the threat to take over Addis Ababa as a likely trigger for a genocide.
