= Kumsa Diriba =

Ethiopian militant, leader of Oromo Liberation Army

Jaal Kumsa Diriba

Personal details
- Born: Kumsaa Dirribaa; 1 January 1977 (age 49) Horro Guduru, Welega Province, Ethiopia
- Known for: Leadership of the OLA
- Nickname: Jaal Marroo

Military service
- Allegiance: Oromo Liberation Army
- Rank: Commander-in-Chief
- Battles/wars: Oromo conflict; OLA insurgency

Kumsa Diriba (Note: Oromo: Kumsaa Dirribaa; Amharic: ኩምሳ ድሪባ) (born 1 January 1977), better known by his nom de guerre Jaal Marroo, is an Ethiopian rebel leader who currently serves as the Commander-in Chief of the Oromo Liberation Army.

In August 2021, Diriba announced an alliance against the Government of Ethiopia with the Tigray Defense Forces, stating that he and the OLA aimed to overthrow the government militarily. In November 2021, he claimed to the Agence France-Presse that OLA troops were near the Ethiopian capital of Addis Ababa.
