= Adi Daero school airstrike =

2022 airstrike in Tigray, Ethiopia

- Part of Tigray War
- Type: Airstrike
- Location: Adi Daero, La'ilay Adiyabo Tigray Region, Ethiopia; 14°18′43″N 38°10′23″E
- Date: 4 October 2022
- Executed by: Ethiopian Air Force
- Casualties: 50-65+ internally displaced people killed 70+ injured
- Location within Ethiopia

On 4 October 2022, the Ethiopian National Defense Force launched an airstrike at a school housing internally displaced people in the town of Adi Daero in La'ilay Adiyabo, killing more than 50 and injuring at least 70 others. According to Tigrayan authorities and some witnesses the death toll was at least 65. The attack is one of the deadliest in the Tigray War.

== Response ==
In January, the United Nations reportedly sent a letter to Ethiopia's government, informing them of locations being used to house IDPs, including the school in Adi Daero. Billene Seyoum, the spokesperson of Ethiopia's Prime Minister Abiy Ahmed, did not comment on the letter.

== See also ==
- Dedebit Elementary School airstrike (January 2022)
- Mekelle kindergarten airstrike (August 2022)
