= Battle of Humera =

2020 battle in Ethiopia, as part of the Tigray War

- Part of the Tigray War
Date	9–11 November 2020
Location	Humera, Tigray Region, Ethiopia
Result	Ethiopian victory: TPLF abandons Humera; Ethiopia takes control of Humera

Belligerents
Ethiopia; Eritrea	Tigray Region

Commanders and leaders
Abiy Ahmed (Prime Minister of Ethiopia); Mohammed Tessema (Head of the army's indoctrination division)	Debretsion Gebremichael (Chief Administrator of Tigray Region and TPLF Chairman)

Units involved
(Ethiopia) Ethiopian National Defense Force	Local militia Tigray Special Forces (10 November only)

Strength
Unknown	~400

Casualties and losses
(Ethiopia) 1+ killed (Ethiopia) 6+ wounded	Several wounded
- 92 killed in total (including deaths from the Humera massacre); 46 Civilians killed ~200 Civilians wounded

The Battle of Humera was fought between Ethiopia and allied forces against forces loyal to the Tigray People's Liberation Front (TPLF) in the city of Humera during the Tigray War. The battle took place from 9 to 11 November 2020, and is the first recorded time Eritrean troops saw action. It also led to the Humera massacre when Amhara and Ethiopian troops started beating and killing civilians. Many more civilians were killed and wounded because of the shelling during the battle. After it was controlled by the Eritrean, Ethiopian and Amhara (Fano, Amhara Special Forces and Militia) started house in house search detained everyone they found, loot every house and put the people in concentration camps. Day by day the Amhara forces killed the residents they put in the concentration camps, and dumped the bodies over the bridge into Tekeze River.

== Prelude ==
According to a local militia member, the Tigray special forces had already left the city under militia control before the battle began. The Tigray special forces were needed in other towns and city in western Tigray. No significant defensive systems were set up and most militia forces were stationed along the Tekeze River with AK47 assault rifles, machine guns, and snipers.

== Battle ==
=== Ground fighting ===
Soon after, the federal forces began an exchange of gun fire with local militias at a camp near the Eritrean border. At least one federal soldier was killed when he ran across the Tekeze bridge toward Eritrea. Both forces were wounded. On 10 November, federal forces captured the Humera Airport. On the same day, the local militias opened machine gun fire at the soldiers crossing the Tekeze bridge from Eritrea into Ethiopia. The Tigray special forces came back to Humera to support the militias by firing into Eritrea with heavy weaponry, but it once again abandoned the militias and moved onto central Tigray.

Commenting on the siege, the President of the Tigray region, Debretsion Gebremichael said:

Since yesterday, the army of [Eritrean leader] Isaias [Afwerki] have crossed the country’s boundary and invaded. They were attacking via Humera using heavy arms.

Eritrea denied involvement in the war but later, its involvement was confirmed by the USA.

On 11 November, the local militias lost control of the city.

=== Shelling ===
==== Shelling of Civilians ====
Shellfire from Camp Heligan, located at the outskirts of Humera, engulfed the area on the morning of 9 November. Shelling from Eritrea killed and wounded civilians, and damaged various structures. It continued until the evening and resumed on the morning of 10 November.

According to the doctors at the Kahsay Aberra hospital, around 200 civilians were wounded and 46 were killed in the heavy shelling. Many doctors fled to nearby towns or Sudan. One doctor said:

Civilians started arriving in the hospital with injuries to the abdomen, chest, head. We were at a loss ... People with no hands, people with their stomachs hanging out. This continued the whole day. I don't know how he did it, but a young boy brought a woman to the hospital; her intestines were out. He had tried to tie a scarf around her waist. We somehow managed to stitch her up.

Other staff members transported around 50 injured people to Adebay while many were left behind.

==== Shelling of military targets ====
The shells did hit some military targets, as found by the Human Rights Watch, such as the China camp and a Tigray special forces abandoned jail turned military camp.

== Aftermath ==
The Ethiopian Human Rights Commission (EHRC) visited the towns of Dansha, Humera, and Mai Kadra from 14 to 18 November. They found that after the city was taken by federal forces on 11 November, a youth group calling itself Fano, some members of the Amhara Region Special Force, and Amhara Militia entered the city. Along with a few ENDF and EDF soldiers, they looted houses and businesses, and harassed ethnic Tigray residents. According to the staff at Kahsay Aberra hospital, women have also been raped. Residents and refugees from Humera reported killings of civilians by the Fano and some ENDF troops. The Amhara Special Force and Amhara Militia have taken measures to keep peace inside the city but looting still goes on at night.

The EHRC was unable to access an area called Kebele 2 where most of the shelling damage took place, but the EHRC was able to visit the Kahsay Aberra hospital which sustained serious damage during the shelling. An employee working there told them that at least 92 people (Including ENDF, TPLF, and civilians) had been killed during the war. Some of them died while receiving treatment at the hospital. The hospital had very little medical staff and didn't have any sufficient supply of medicines and medical equipment. There were only 5 people working there and only one of them was a doctor. This is a major downgrade from the hospital's pre-war 457 employees. The hospital was left without food and water.

During the EHRC's visit to Tigray in mid-December, they learned that the hospital went up to 116 staff including 5 doctors. The EHRC were not able to access Humera though.
