= Togogwa (exclosure) =

Exclosure for woodland restoration in Ethiopia

Togogwa exclosure
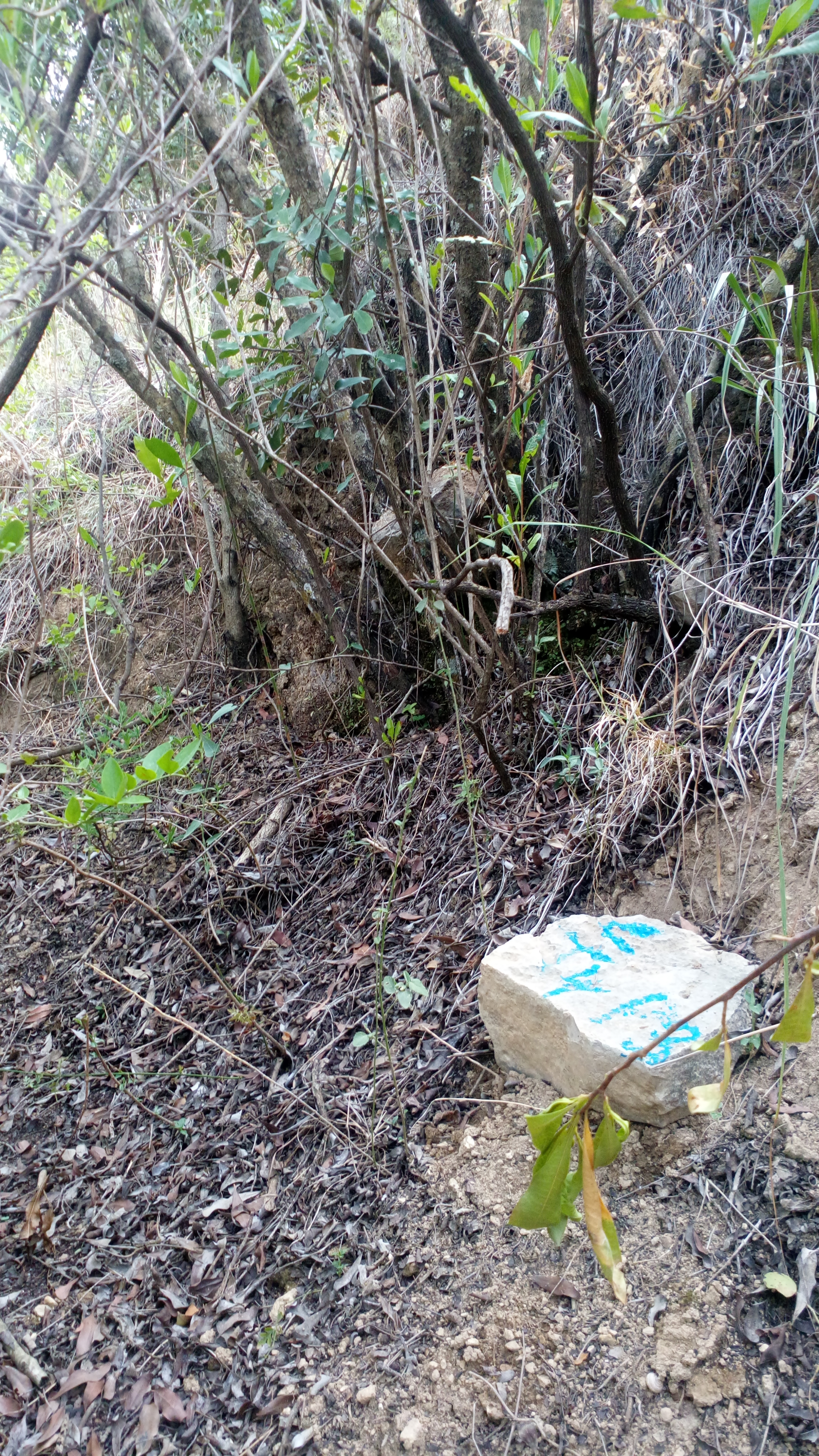
- Togogwa exclosure

- Location within Ethiopia
- Location: Debre Nazret municipality, in Dogu’a Tembien district, Ethiopia
- Nearest city: Hagere Selam
- Coordinates: 13.561°N 39.318°E
- Area: 196 ha (480 acres)
- Established: 1988
- Website: https://ethiotrees.com

Togogwa is an exclosure located in the Dogu'a Tembien woreda of the Tigray Region in Ethiopia. The area has been protected since 1988 by the local community.

== Timeline ==
- 1988: established as exclosure by the community
- 2017: support by the EthioTrees project

== Environmental characteristics ==
- Area: 196 ha
- Average slope gradient: 44%
- Aspect: the exclosure is oriented towards the all directions except north
- Minimum altitude: 1892 metres
- Maximum altitude: 2126 metres
- Lithology: Antalo Limestone

== Management ==
As a general rule, cattle ranging and wood harvesting are not allowed. The grasses are harvested once yearly and taken to the homesteads of the village to feed livestock. There are four guards to protect the exclosure. Field observations showed that no illegal grazing occurred in the exclosure in 2018.

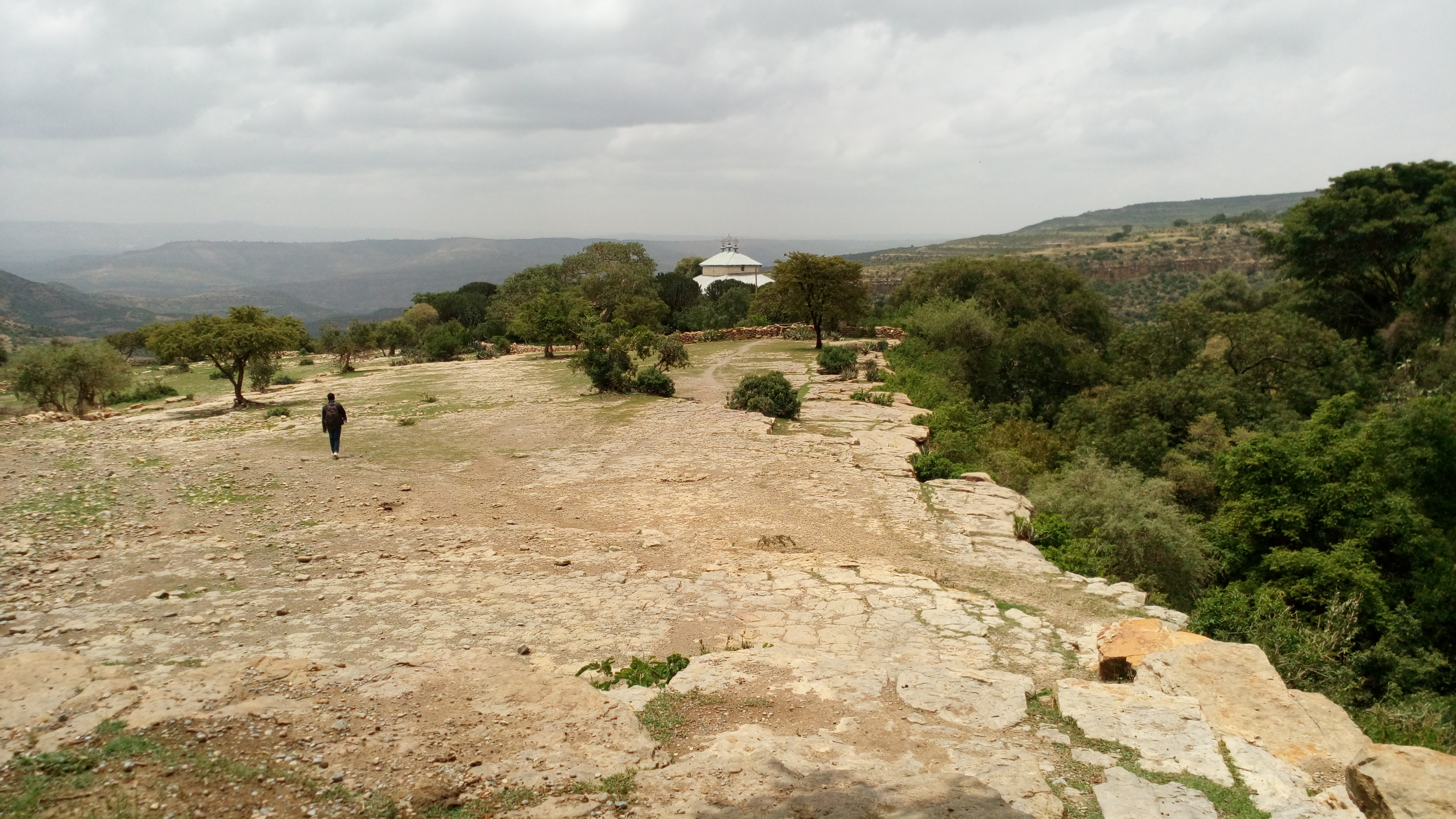
The exclosure is adjacent to Togogwa's Church forest, an important source of seeds that are further dispersed by birds

== Benefits for the community ==
Setting aside such areas fits with the long-term vision of the communities were hiza’iti lands are set aside for use by the future generations. It has also direct benefits for the community:

- improved ground water availability

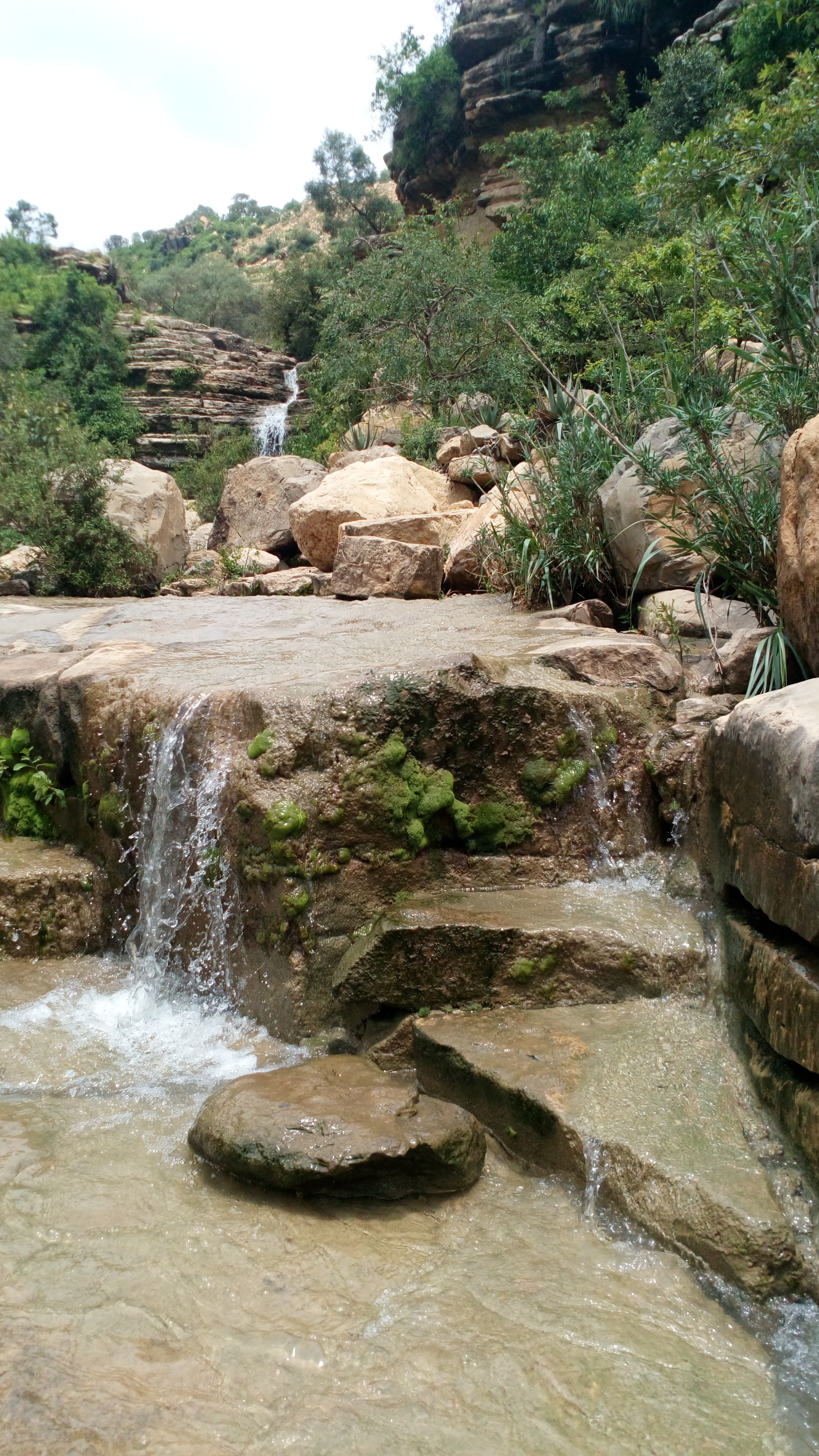
Togogwa river in exclosure

- honey production
- climate ameliorator (temperature, moisture)
- the sequestered carbon (in total 88 tonnes per ha, dominantly sequestered in the soil, and additionally in the woody vegetation) is certified using the Plan Vivo voluntary carbon standard, after which carbon credits are sold
- the revenues are then reinvested in the villages, according to the priorities of the communities; it may be for an additional class in the village school, a water pond, conservation in the exclosures, or a store for incense.

== Biodiversity ==
With vegetation growth, biodiversity in this exclosure hast strongly improved: there is more varied vegetation and wildlife.
