= OLA insurgency =

Armed insurgency in Ethiopia since 2018

- Part of the Oromo conflict and Ethiopian civil conflict (2018–present)
- The Oromia Region of Ethiopia
Date	6 August 2018 – present (8 years, 2 months, 1 week and 4 days)
Location	Oromia, Ethiopia
Status	Ongoing; Start of peace talks between government of Ethiopia and the OLA on 25 April 2023.; Conflict resumes after peace talks failed in May 2023.; Peace agreement signed between major OLA faction and the Ethiopian government on 1 December 2024 and its members started moving into designated camps

Belligerents
Ethiopia; Oromia	OLA

Commanders and leaders
(Ethiopia) Mulatu Teshome; (Ethiopia) Sahle-Work Zewde; (Ethiopia) Taye Atske Selassie; (Ethiopia) Abiy Ahmed; (Ethiopia) Birhanu Jula; (Oromia Region) Shimelis Abdisa	Jaal Marroo

Casualties and losses
- 5,623 killed (per ACLED, Aug. 2018 – Dec. 2022)

The OLA insurgency is an armed insurgency between the Oromo Liberation Army (OLA), which split from the Oromo Liberation Front (OLF) in 2018, and the Ethiopian government, continuing in the context of the long-term Oromo conflict, typically dated to have started with the formation of the Oromo Liberation Front in 1973.

The insurgency has gained strength in recent years, though it is not sufficiently armed or organized enough to pose a serious threat to the government.

== Background ==
The Oromo conflict traces its roots to the formation of the Oromo Liberation Front (OLF) in 1973, which emerged in the aftermath of the Bale Revolt of the 1960s a movement sparked by perceived injustices and marginalization of the Oromo people by ruling authorities and the Oromo people.

In August 2018, the OLF made peace settlements with the Ethiopian government, along with several other groups, including the Ogaden National Liberation Front and Ginbot 7. The OLF leadership agreed to disarm its soldiers within 15 days of their arrival in Addis Ababa. According to then-OLF leader Ibsa Negewo, the OLF claimed to have 1,305 soldiers in Eritrea and 4,000 in West and South Oromia. The men stationed in Eritrea agreed to disarm but most of those in Oromia refused to do so despite their leaders’ wishes. One leader, Kumsa Diriba, also known by his nom de guerre as "Jaal Maro", failed to reach a deal with the government and after a falling out with the OLF, he split away from the OLF and formed OLF–Shene, also known as the Oromo Liberation Army (OLA). Security forces promised to crush the group within two weeks but haven't been able to do so even after 5 years of fighting.

== Timeline ==
During the two years following its 2018 split with the OLF, the OLA killed 700 civilians in the East and West Guji Zones according to Haaji Umar Nagessa, a "veteran freedom fighter and tribal leader", who was assassinated by the OLA on 4 April 2020.

On 29 May 2020, Amnesty International released a report accusing the security forces of Ethiopia of mass detentions and extrajudicial killings. The report stated that in 2019, at least 25 people, suspected of supporting the Oromo Liberation Army, were killed by the forces in parts the Oromia Region. Between January and September 2019, at least 10,000 people were detained under suspicion, where most were "subjected to brutal beatings".

=== Joint offensive with the TDF (2021) ===
In March 2021 during the Tigray War, a division of the Eritrean Defence Forces left the Tigray Region and arrived in the Oromia Region to fight against the Oromo Liberation Army (OLA), according to Freedom Friday. On 11 August 2021, the OLA leader Kumsa Diriba (nom de guerre Jaal Maroo) announced that the group had formed an alliance with Tigray People's Liberation Front (TPLF) and that there were plans among opposition groups to establish a "grand coalition" against prime minister Abiy Ahmed, himself an Oromo.

During Irreechaa celebrations in early October, protestors chanted against Abiy Ahmed and in favour of OLA commander Jaal Marroo. By late October, the OLA controlled much of the former Wollega province. On 31 October, the OLA took control of Kamisee in the Oromia Zone of the Amhara Region, at the same time as the Tigray Defense Forces took control of Kombolcha, about 50 kilometres to the north.

On 1 November, OLA Commander-in-Chief Jaal Marroo said that the OLA had taken "several towns in western, central, and southern Oromia, facing little resistance from government forces who were retreating."

During early and mid-November 2021, a TDF–OLA joint offensive took several towns in North Shewa zone of Amhara Region along a major road leading south from Tigray Region to the Ethiopian capital Addis Ababa, appearing to threaten a military attack on Addis Ababa.

=== November 2022 – December 2024 ===
Fighting between the OLA and Ethiopian government escalated during November 2022, as clashes between the two killed dozens. An alleged aerial attack killed many in the village of Bila in the West Welega Zone; battles between rebels and government forces in Nekemte followed this attack. It was reported that the OLA seized control of Hamuma Gindo, Babu Dire, Becho, and Harbu kebeles, following clashes with militias there. Drone strikes against the rebels by the Ethiopian military occurred during that time. There were also reports of abductions and attacks against civilians by the OLA. The OLA and Amhara militias clashed in Gutin during December, and both groups were reported to have attacked civilians during their conflict, with Amhara militias attacking civilians in Welenchiti, and the OLA attacking in Kiremu. Many of the Amhara militias have been identified as the Fano militia.

Estimated to be only a few thousand men in 2018, the OLA has gained strength in recent years, though it is not sufficiently armed or organized enough to pose a serious threat to the government. On 1 December 2024, a major OLA faction led by Jaal Senay Negasa and reached a peace agreement with the Ethiopian government after years of previous peace talks in Tanzania.

== See also ==
- Abo church massacre
- Ethnic discrimination in Ethiopia
