= Togoga airstrike =

Airstrike occurred in Tigray Region, Ethiopia

Coordinates: 13.5627°N 39.2949°E

Togoga airstrike ተጎጓ ደብድብ ኣየር
- Part of Tigray War
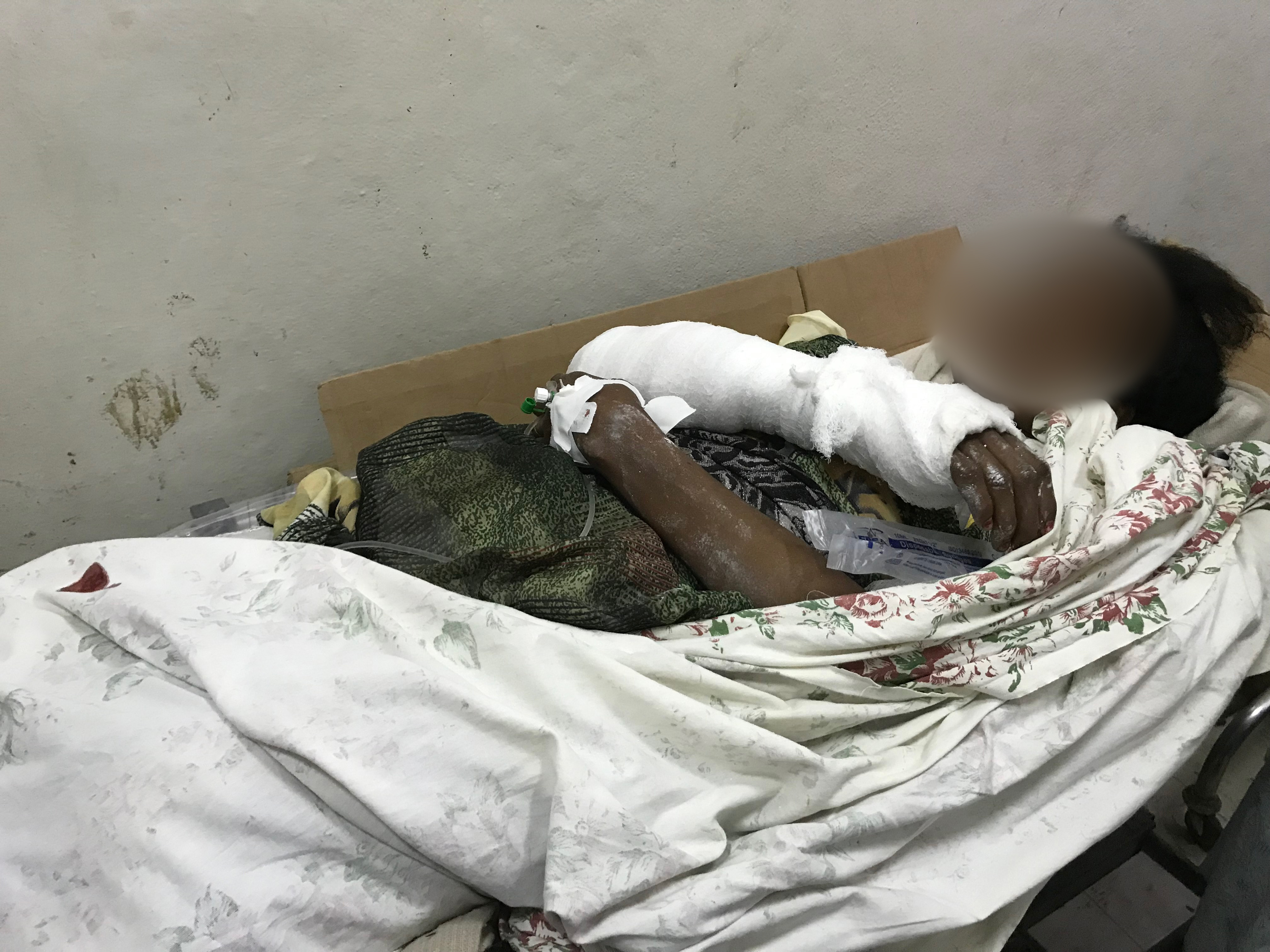
- A victim of the airstrike

- Location of Togoga in Tigray (Ethiopia)
- Location: Togoga or Togogwa (Tigrinya: ቶጎጓ), Tigray Region, Ethiopia
- Date: 22 June 2021
- Attack type: Airstrike
- Deaths: 64+
- Injuries: 184
- Perpetrator: (Ethiopia) Ethiopian Air Force

The Togoga airstrike was an airstrike by the Ethiopian Air Force on the town of Togoga in the Tigray Region of Ethiopia, on a market day, during the Tigray War, on 22 June 2021. 64 people were killed and 180 others were injured.

== Attack ==
At 1 PM on 22 June 2021, the marketplace of Togoga, a village in northern Ethiopia's Tigray Region, was hit by an airstrike killing 64, wounding 184.

Tuesday is market day in Togogwa. There were many people in the market, between 3000-5000 people from the wider surroundings (up to 15-20 km away, all people are on foot); the market is a weekly market, but in June there are always many people in the market because it is sowing time, and people come to exchange or buy seed.

Ambulances attempting to reach Togoga were blocked by soldiers near Tukhul, but another convoy of ambulances managed to reach via a different route. One convoy of ambulances were even shot at by Ethiopian troops two separate times. Ambulances managed to bring 25 of the wounded (including toddlers) to Ayder Referral Hospital in Mekelle a day later.

The Ethiopian Government says they targeted the market because a group of TDF fighters were wearing civilian clothes commemorating the 33 anniversary Hawzen massacre locally known as Martyrs’ Day.

== Victims ==
Most of the victims were attending Togoga's weekly market and had travelled from surrounding villages. The dispersal of victims and difficulties accessing the area complicated efforts to determine the full number and identities of those killed.

== Reactions ==
- Hailu Kebede, foreign affairs head for the Salsay Woyane Tigray opposition party originates from Togogwa and was interviewed by the Associated Press.
- The UN stated that they are "deeply disturbed" about reported of aid being blocked to the bomb site. Ramesh Rajasingham the Assistant Secretary-General for Humanitarian Affairs and Deputy Emergency Relief Coordinator stated "attacks directed against civilians and indiscriminate attacks are prohibited."
- The EU stated that "if confirmed, the blocking of ambulances could amount to a violation of international law.". The EU also stated that (this bombing) "adds to the appalling series of violations of international humanitarian law and human rights" and that they “strongly condemns the deliberate targeting of civilians”.
- The U.S. State Department stated it is "concerned by reports of civilian deaths in the market attack and urged Ethiopian authorities to ensure full medical access for all the victims." and that "We also call for an urgent and independent investigation, as well as remedial action, to hold those responsible for this attack accountable".
