= Debre Sina, Ethiopia =

Town in Amhara Region, Ethiopia

Debre Sina
- Town
- Location within Ethiopia
- Coordinates: 9°51′00″N 39°45′43″E
- Country: Ethiopia
- Region: Amhara
- Zone: Semien Shewa
- District: Termaber
- Elevation: 2,700 m (8,900 ft)
- Time zone: UTC+3 (EAT)

Debre Sina is a town in Amhara Region, Ethiopia. Located in Semien Shewa (North Shewa) zone, the town has an elevation of 2630 to 2830 meters above sea level. Although the district was named after this town, the administrative center of the Debre Sina district is located in Mekane Selam. Debre Sina is located along Ethiopian Highway 2, just west of Debre Sina. The national highway reaches its highest point at 3120 meters above sea level. Just below the top of the Termaber pass, a tunnel was constructed by the Italians in 1938. The highest elevations along this escarpment reach beyond 3300 meters.

Hydrologically, Debre Sina is located in the Afar endoreic basin. Just to the west of Debre Sina, the Termaber pass crosses the continental divide into the Jamma River and Nile basin.

== History ==
=== 20th century ===
During the Italian occupation, the Termaber Pass was referred to as the "passo Mussolini".
