= Shimelis Abdisa =

Ethiopian politician; President of Oromia Region since 2019

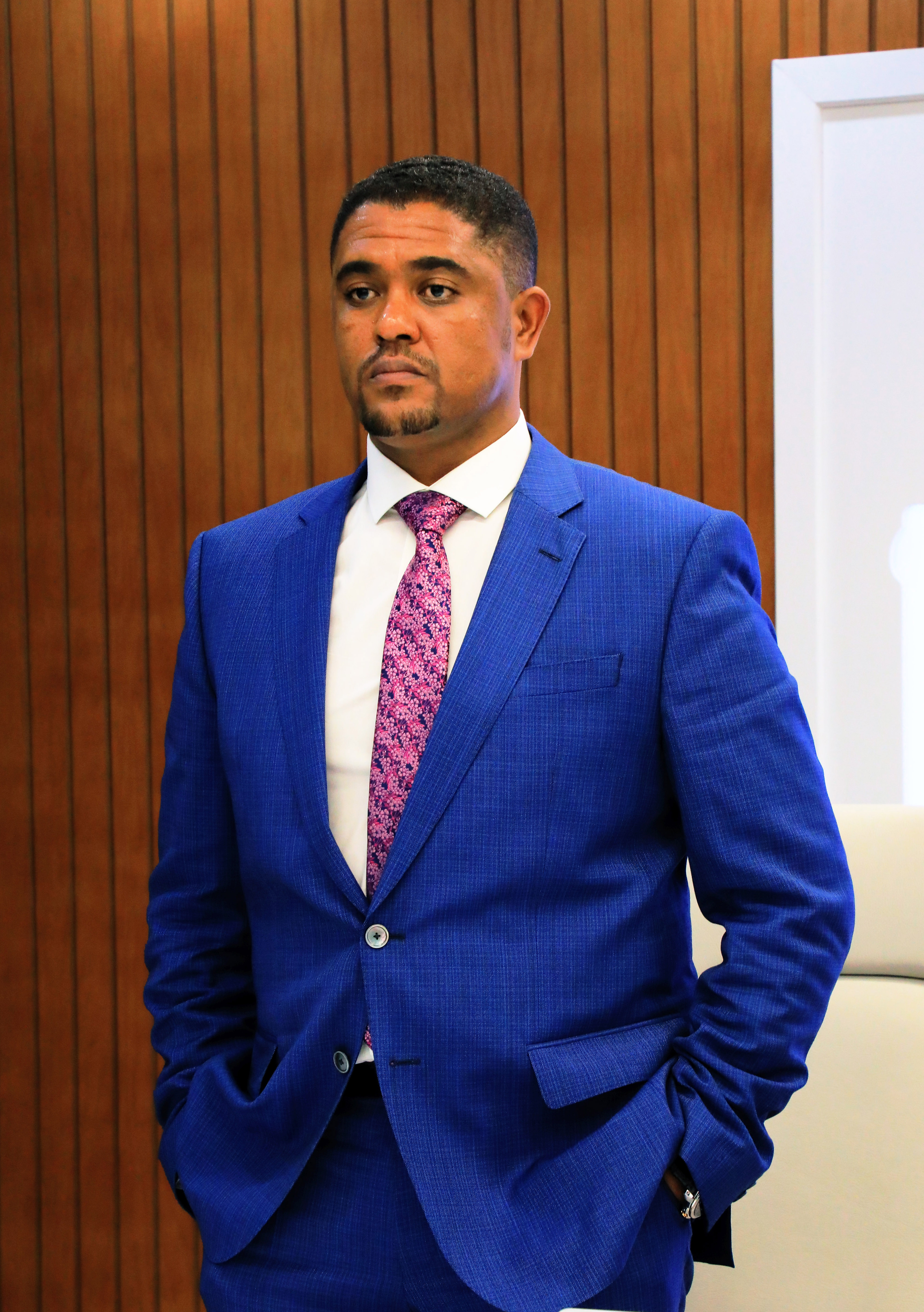

Chief Administrator of Oromia Region
- Incumbent
- Assumed office 18 April 2019
- Prime Minister: Abiy Ahmed
- Preceded by: Lemma Megersa

Chief of Staff of Prime Minister of Ethiopia
- Incumbent
- Assumed office 5 November 2018
- Preceded by: Fitsum Arega

Personal details
- Born: Ginchi, Ethiopia
- Party: Prosperity Party
- Education: Addis Ababa University

Shimelis Abdisa (Oromo: Shimallis Abdiisaa; Amharic: ሽመልስ አብዲሳ) is an Ethiopian politician. He serves as president of the Oromia Region since 18 April 2019. He is also Chief of Staff of Prime Minister Abiy Ahmed since 2018.

According to Reuters, he is the leader of Koree Nageenyaa, a secret service that commits unlawful detentions and extrajudicial killings in Oromia Region.

== Early life ==
Shimelis Abdisa was born near Ambo, West Shewa Zone, Oromia Region, Ethiopia.

== Career ==
He served as Head of the Office of the Prime Minister beginning in November 2018. On 18 April 2019, the Oromia Regional State Council appointed Shimelis as president of the Oromia Region. The Oromia Broadcasting Network called the election.

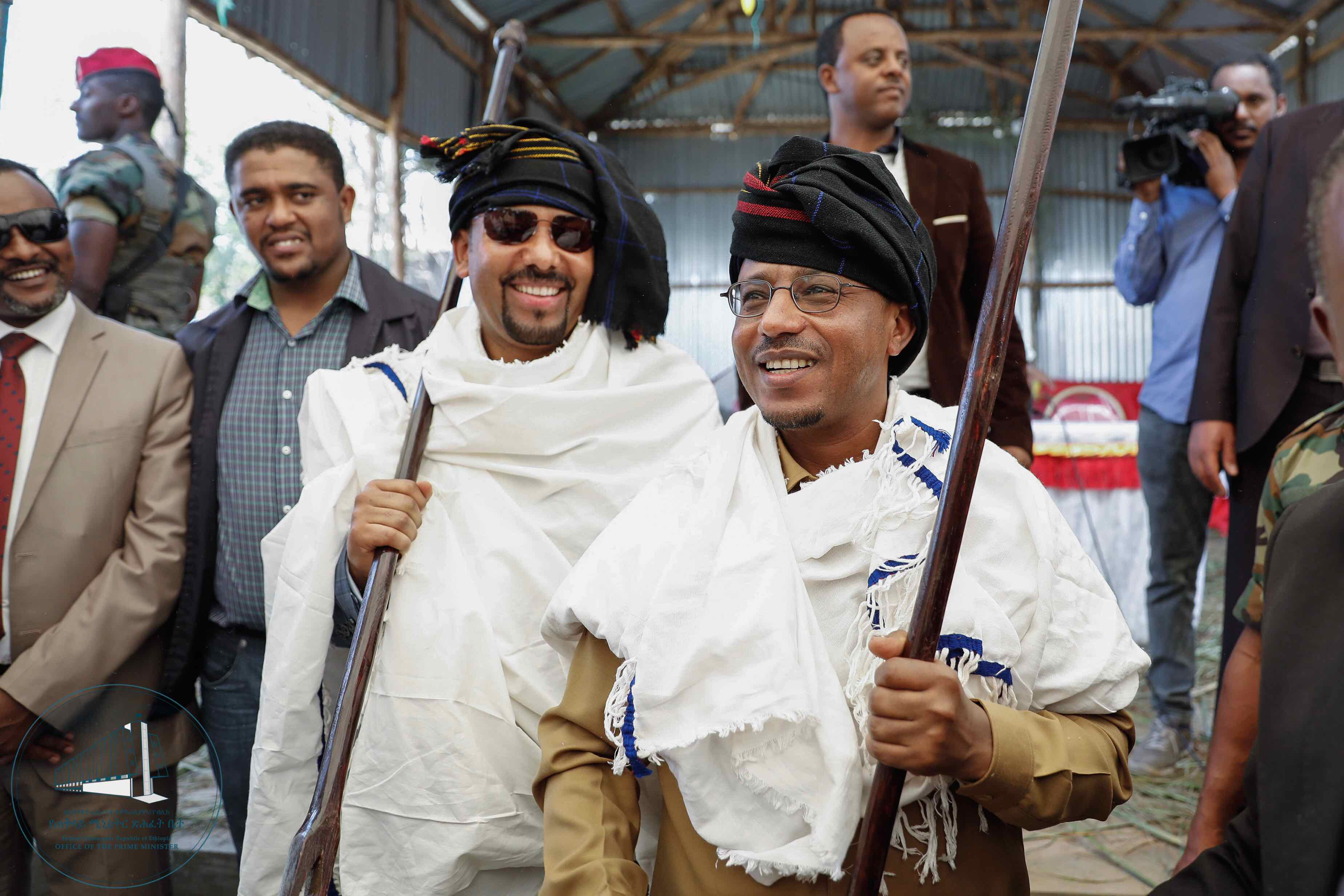
Shimeles (second left) with Prime Minister Abiy Ahmed and Defense Minister Lemma Megersa in February 2019

Since Shimelis took office, the Irrechaa celebrations returned to Addis Ababa for the first time in 150 years on 4 October 2019. During an emergency meeting by the Holy Synod of the Ethiopian Orthodox Tewahedo Church on 5 September 2019, Shimelis vowed to protect the Church. The Ireecha was held on 4 October 2019 throughout towns in Oromia Region as well as Addis Ababa. Shimelis made a controversial speech that recalled the oppression of Oromo people by the neftegna system during Ethiopian Empire rule. Many people criticized his speech. The Ethiopian Citizens for Social Justice stated that the Oromo Democratic Party (ODP) used the festival for politically purposes. In 2022, the head of Amhara Association of America called for Shemelis to resign from office as a result of growing persecution of Amhara people in Wollega.

== See also ==
- Koree Nageenyaa
