= Oromo Liberation Army =

Armed movement in Ethiopia

- Oromo Liberation Army (OLA)
- Flag of the Oromo Liberation Army
- Leaders: Jaal Marroo; Gammachis Aboye; Sanyi Nagassa (surrendered)
- Dates active: April 2018–present
- Split from: Oromo Liberation Front
- Active regions: Oromia Region, Ethiopia
- Ideology: Oromo nationalism; Sovereignty; Democracy
- Size: 3,000 (2023)
- Wars: Ethiopian civil conflict (2018–present); Oromo conflict; OLA insurgency; 2021 Ataye clashes; 2022 North Shewa clashes; Gambela conflict; Tigray War; TDF-OLA joint offensive; 2026 Ethiopian offensive

The Oromo Liberation Army (OLA; Oromo: Waraana Bilisummaa Oromoo, WBO) is an armed opposition group active in the Oromia Region of Ethiopia. The OLA consists primarily of former armed members of the pre-peace deal Oromo Liberation Front (OLF) who refused to disarm out of skepticism of the peace deal, and officially split in April 2020.

The Ethiopian government considers the OLF to be a legal political party but the OLA to be a terrorist group. In 2021, the group announced it had established a political wing and would adopt Oromo Liberation Front-Oromo Liberation Army (OLF-OLA; Oromo: Adda Bilisummaa Oromoo-Waraana Bilisummaa Oromoo, ABO-WBO) as its official name. The Ethiopian government refuses to call the OLA by its chosen name, instead referring to it as Shene (from Oromo: Shanee, lit. 'five') or Oneg.

== History ==
The Oromo Liberation Army, then the military wing of the Oromo Liberation Front (OLF), was formed in 1974, evolving from the Bale Revolt that started in the 1960s in response to the Ethiopian government's abuses and oppression of the Oromo people.

In August 2018, a peace agreement was signed between the Ethiopian government and the OLF, declaring a ceasefire, disarming of the OLF, the continuation of OLF activities by "peaceful means", and the creation of a joint committee for implementing the agreement. Some factions of OLF armed wing, the Oromo Liberation Army, refused to disarm out of skepticism of the government's intent to abide by the agreement, thereby disassociating itself from the OLF and leading to the Oromo Liberation Army to separate from the OLF. These commanders officially split from the OLF political wing in April 2019 and have since maintained an anti-government insurgency in the peripheral areas of western Oromia. As of 29 November 2021 Jaal Marroo, the commander-in-chief of OLA, largely operated the Western Command, Jaal Sanyi Nagassa led the Central Command while Jaal Gemechu Aboye, the deputy leader of OLA according to Sveriges Radio, led the Southern Command.

While the OLA insurgency was relatively minor and relegated to small rural pockets before the Tigray War, Ethiopian troops were forced to move north and leave a security vacuum in Oromia, allowing the OLA to expand. Throughout 2020, 2021, and 2022, the group grew exponentially and controlled large swaths of territory in rural and semi-rural locations throughout the area.

By late October 2021, the OLA controlled various areas in the Welega Zone, Oromia Region including East, West, Kellam, and Horo. On 1 November, Jaal Marroo stated that the OLA had taken "several towns in western, central, and southern Oromia, facing little resistance from government forces who were retreating." The OLA also used the opportunity presented by the Tigray War to take brief control of Kamisee on 31 October 2021, as the Tigray Defence Forces advanced on Kombolcha.

In February 2022, Prime Minister Abiy Ahmed acknowledged the federal government's difficulty in suppressing the OLA, citing its strong public support in Oromia. He admitted that a purely military approach was ineffective, as local Oromo communities were shielding the fighters. Additionally, the government conceded that the OLA had regained control of 1,739 kebeles, while government forces had only managed to reclaim 1,255. Despite official claims of successful operations against the group, OLA remains active in Oromia and continued to reclaim territory. In late October 2022, the OLA launched a large-scale military offensive into West and East Welega. On 6 November 2022, they entered the town of Nekemte where they engaged in urban combat with the Ethiopian police before a same-day retreat.

Massacres of ethnic Amharas in the region has provoked retaliatory raids by Fano militias from the Amhara Region, who regularly clash with the OLA on border areas where a significant number of ethnic Amhara and Oromo reside together. Large scale clashes between these groups have been reported in East Welega, West Welega, Horo Guduru and North Shewa, resulting in the displacement of more than 20,000 Oromos. As of August 2024, Addis Standard reports that Fano is still active in parts of Oromia's North Shewa zone, with entire districts becoming "uninhabitable" for Oromo residents.

In January 2023 the OLF-OLA released a political manifesto in which they claimed they fought for "the freedom of the Oromo people from political exclusion, economic exploitation, and socio-cultural marginalization" and for "the right of our people to determine their political destiny and establish a responsive government through freely elected representatives."

Peace talks between the government and OLA have been mediated in Tanzania, the first was in April 2023 and the second round in November in collaboration with IGAD. Both of peace talks failed to reach an agreement; Redwan Hussien blamed "unrealistic demands" for the failure of the peace talks while the OLA accused the Ethiopian government of co-opting leadership rather than "beginning to address fundamental problems that underlie the country’s seemingly insurmountable security and political challenges".

In April 2023, violence shifted eastward to West and North Shewa zones as conflict in western Oromia decreased. This change coincided with failed peace talks and the dissolution of regional special forces, whose role was taken over by the Ethiopian National Defense Force (ENDF). Although violence levels in western Oromia have declined from previous peaks, instability remains a significant concern. In mid-2024, the ACLED recorded that violence levels in western Oromia have since remained steady, at reduced levels relative to the spikes in July and November 2022.

In September 2024, it was reported that the OLA-Central Command, under Sanyi Nagasa, broke away from the OLA after Nagasa accused the OLA's leader of authoritarian rule and corruption. The OLA denied the reports, stating that Nagasa was dismissed months earlier for "sabotage."

On 1 December, a peace agreement was signed between the Oromia President Shimelis Abdisa and Sanyi Nagasa's OLA faction, which stipulated that OLA fighters be moved into designated camps. This agreement reportedly resulted in the surrender of over 800 OLA fighters to the government. Nagasa was also reportedly appointed as the security advisor to President Abdisa after the agreement. By February 2025, the ACLED records clashes between the OLA and government forces in Oromia decreased by 60% since the peace agreement. This also coincided with Kenya announcing an operation against the OLA at the Ethiopian border with the aim of curbing OLA activity.

As of July 2025, the OLA holds significant influence in the countryside surrounding Dembi Dollo.

Territorial control as of November 2025. (Note: Other maps of territorial control in this war are presented by MapEthiopia) (For a more detailed, up-to-date, interactive map, see here). Pro-federal government troops Ethiopian federal government and regional allies Anti-federal government rebels Controlled by the Tigray People's Liberation Front Oromo Liberation Army Fano

== Human rights abuse accusations ==
Overall, from April 2018 to April 2020, OLA killed 700 civilians according to Haaji Umar Nagessa, who was himself assassinated by the OLA on 4 April 2020. In June 2021, Nagessa Dube listed 20 extrajudicial executions by OLA, including that of Liban Halake, a Araddaa leader; and on 17 May 2021 of Waaqgaarii Qajeelaa, head of transportation for West Welega Zone and five other officials. According to Nagessa, the extrajudicial executions are typically announced by OLA on its Facebook online social mediapage. Nagessa stated that he had received death threats and that OLA sees the execution of critics such as him as "righteous". The OLA denied the accusations, although they do admit to engaging in Targeted killings in which they are often involved in violent assassinations of government officials.

The Ethiopian government has likewise been accused of committing extrajudicial killings of suspected OLA supporters and then blaming it on the OLA. In May 2021, a 17-year-old boy was shot and killed by Oromia Regional Special Forces in a public square in Dembidolo for allegedly being an OLA member. Telecommunications blackouts as part of security operations are common and hinder the reporting of incidents of violence against civilians. On 30 November 2021, 14 traditional ethnic Oromo leaders of the Karayu Oromo community were executed. The government initially had attempted to attribute the killings to the OLA, but after witnesses and two people who managed to escape attributed it to government forces, this led to a fallout in which a Member of the House of Peoples' Representatives, the Ethiopian Human Right's Commission, the State minister for Peace and the secretary of the Oromo Gada leaders council all had publicly implicated the government responsible for the killings.

The OLA has established a strong presence in western Oromia but has faced challenges expanding into other parts of the region. One key factor is the long-standing territorial disputes in western Oromia, which have impacted local communities for decades. In East, West, and Horo Guduru Wollega zones, ethnic Amharas who settled in the 1970s and 1980s have periodically clashed with Oromo inhabitants over land and resources. These tensions have significantly escalated since Abiy Ahmed took office, clashes between Oromo and Amhara militias have become more frequent, often leading to widespread civilian displacement. In contested areas, OLA has positioned itself as a protector against territorial incursions. However, this stance has brought it into direct conflict with local Amhara communities. The group has been accused of carrying out massacres against Amhara civilians, though it denies these allegations.

On 2 November 2020, 54 people—mostly ethnic Amhara women, children and elderly people—were killed in the village of Gawa Qanqa, after government security forces "abruptly and inexplicably left", by attackers identifying themselves as OLA. OLA denied responsibility instead claiming that "The local admin[instration] works alongside Oromia Police & ex-OLA defectors to carry out these operations."

On 18 August 2021, the OLA was accused by the Ethiopian Human Rights Commission (EHRC) of killing 150 Amharas in the Gida Kiremu massacre, this resulted in a retaliatory raid by Fano militias, which attacked the OLA in the town and killed more 60 Oromos in "ethnic retaliation" over the following days. The OLA immediately released a statement denying responsibility for the killings, and saying that the deaths were from battles between OLA militants and a Amhara militia that crossed the regional border and attacked Oromo farmers.

In June 2022, locals on the ground accused the OLA of killing over 400 ethnic Amharas during the Gimbi massacre, the highest recorded fatality incident in the region. Witnesses state they knew it was OLA because of their braided hair, military camouflage and because they spoke the Oromo language. The OLA denied these allegations, instead saying the killings were committed by a pro-government militia known as the Gaachana Sirnaa and reiterated their calls for independent investigations into atrocities committed in Oromia. In a press release on 10 December 2022, the OLA High Command stated their war was not with any population group and called on the Oromo people to avoid the Ethiopian governments attempts at sparking confrontations with "our brothers and sisters from different communities". They further added on and called for Oromos to protect members of ethnic minorities in the Oromia region.

On 5 July 2022, Hangassa Ibrahim, a member of the Ethiopian parliament, went on Facebook live stating that it is not the OLA committing massacres across Oromia but rather another group formed by actors in the regional government, he then urged Abiy Ahmed to take action against Oromia regional authorities. On 21 May 2023, The Wall Street Journal released a publication in which witnesses were attributing massacres to a "Fekade Abdisa", a rogue ex-OLA operative who doesn't answer to the commander Jaal Marroo. Residents said Fekade's troops fought the OLA at times but rarely ever engaged with the government.

== Legal status ==
Facebook designates OLA as a "violent non-state actor" on its list of organizations or individuals that proclaim a violent mission or are engaged in violence. According to Facebook's policy, non-state actors that are engaged in a military struggle are not to be allowed on its platform.

On 6 May 2021, the Ethiopian House of Peoples' Representatives declared OLA to be a terrorist organisation.
