= Ethiopian civil conflict (2018–present) =

Period of civil conflict and unrest in Ethiopia during Abiy Ahmed's tenure

- Military situation Controlled by the Federal Democratic Republic of Ethiopia (ENDF and allied militias) Controlled by the National Regional State of Tigray (TDF) Controlled by the Oromo Liberation Army (OLA) Controlled by the Fano (Amhara militia) Controlled by the Afar National Unity Revolutionary Front (ANURF) (For an up-to-date, interactive, detailed map, see here.)
Date	2 April 2018 – present (8 years, 6 months, 4 weeks and 1 day)
Location	Ethiopia: Mainly Oromia, Amhara and Tigray Regions with occasional spillover in Sudan, and Eritrea
Status	Ongoing List: Oromo conflict (1973–present); OLA insurgency (2018–present); Benishangul-Gumuz conflict (2019–2022); Tigray War (2020–2022); TPLF retains control of Tigray; 2022 Peace Agreement nullified in 2026; Al-Fashaga conflict (2020–2022); al-Shabaab invasion of Ethiopia (2022); Fano insurgency (2023–present); Fano captures most of rural Amhara; Ceasefire between Ethiopian government and some rebel groups; April 2023 OLA peace talks between government of Ethiopia and the OLA fail by May; A major OLA faction and the government signed a peace deal on 1 December 2024 and its members started moving into designated camps; Short skirmish erupted in late January to early February 2026 between TPLF and Ethiopian government forces over disputed Tselemti and Raya Azebo districts; Ethiopian support to the RSF during the Blue Nile campaign of the Sudanese civil war; September 2026: 7 rebel groups form alliance and begin offensive to overthrow Ethiopian federal government; October 2026: Eritrean invasion of Ethiopia

Belligerents
EPFCS (2026–present); TPLF; Fano (2023–present); AFNM; OLA; ONLF (disputed); ANURF; BPLM; GPDM; UFEFCF (2021–2022); ARDUF; MGS; Eritrea (2026–present); al-Shabaab (2022)	Ethiopia; Eritrea (2020–22); RSF

Commanders and leaders
Debretsion Gebremichael; Zemene Kassie; (Oromo Liberation Army) Kumsa Diriba; (Eritrea) Isaias Afwerki	Abiy Ahmed; Birhanu Jula Gelalcha; Adem Mohammed; Se'are Mekonnen X

Units involved
Tigray Defense Forces; Oromo Liberation Army; AFNM; ONLF (disputed); ARDUF; ANURF; BPLM; GPDM; MGS; Eritrean Defence Forces (2026–present); Eritrean Army; al-Shabaab	Ethiopian National Defense Force; Ethiopian Army; Ethiopian Air Force; Ethiopian Regional Special Forces; Tigray Peace Force; Fano (until 2023); Ethiopian Federal Police; Eritrean Defence Forces (2020–22); Eritrean Army; Eritrean Air Force

Casualties and losses
5,600 killed, 2,300 injured, 2,000 captured (Ethiopian claim); 800+ killed, 100 captured (Ethiopian claim)	10,383+ killed 8,000 captured 2 MiG-23 lost 2 Mi-35 lost 1 C-130 lost
- 100,000+ deaths (per UCDP); 2,750,000 internally displaced

The Ethiopian civil conflict is a series of armed conflicts in Ethiopia that have been ongoing since 2018. In November 2019, three of the four constituent parties of the ruling Ethiopian People's Revolutionary Democratic Front (EPRDF) approved a merger into the Prosperity Party, while the Tigray People's Liberation Front (TPLF) opposed the move. After the 20-year border conflict between Ethiopia and Eritrea, a decade of internal tensions, two years of protests, and a state of emergency, Hailemariam Desalegn resigned on 15 February 2018 as prime minister and EPRDF chairman, and there were hopes of peace under his successor Abiy Ahmed. However, war broke out in the Tigray Region, with resurgent regional and ethnic factional attacks throughout Ethiopia. The civil wars caused substantial human rights violations, war crimes, and extrajudicial killings.

In March 2018, the EPRDF nominated Abiy Ahmed to succeed Desalegn, and he was made Prime Minister by the Ethiopian parliament on April 2. The 42-year-old Abiy reformed the country's economy, released political opponents, allowed the return of exiles, relaxed press restrictions, and freed diverse political groups to organize. He was awarded the Nobel Peace Prize in 2019 for ending the war with Eritrea. Although his early reforms generated optimism for a departure from the deeply entrenched ethnic politics of the EPRDF era, the ethnic federalist system remained in place, and ethnic polarization and violence significantly worsened.

In November 2020, war broke out in Tigray between the federal government and the regional government. The Ethiopian National Defense Force (ENDF) and Eritrean Defence Forces (EDF) occupied Tigray's capital of Mekelle. The Tigray Defense Forces retook most of Tigray in mid-2021, and in late 2021 allied with the Oromo Liberation Army (OLA) along with seven smaller rebel groups including Tigray People's Liberation Front (TPLF), forming the United Front of Ethiopian Federalist and Confederalist Forces. After two years of shifting alliances and conflicts, TPLF and the Ethiopian government signed a peace treaty in Pretoria on 2 November 2022. However, sporadic civil conflicts continued such as the Gambela conflict, OLA insurgency, and Fano insurgency, the latter two carried out by OLA and Fano militants against the federal government respectively.

In 2026, 7 rebel groups formed the Tsimdo alliance and initiated an offensive to overthrow the Ethiopian federal government.

== Background ==
Most modern conflicts in Ethiopia are the result of Abyssinian expansionism in the late 19th- and 20th centuries under Emperor Menelik II, whose period saw the plurality of ethnicity in Ethiopia split into multiethnic states. Since then, the political system has failed as a result of not adequately recognising ethnolinguistic diversity. In addition, Menelik II forced regional lords to pay taxes to the Shewan government for the sake of administering their lands. This was especially done by these other kingdoms in the present day: Jimma, Benishangul-Gumuz Region, Wellega and Bale. Historians correspond this type of system as a prototype of the current federalism in Ethiopia.

Throughout the 20th century, Ethiopia witnessed prolonged political turmoil. Starting from fascist Italian occupation (1935–1941), imperial Haile Selassie period (1930–1974) and Derg regime (1974–1991), political violence has increasingly engendered Ethiopia to instability and severe human rights violations.

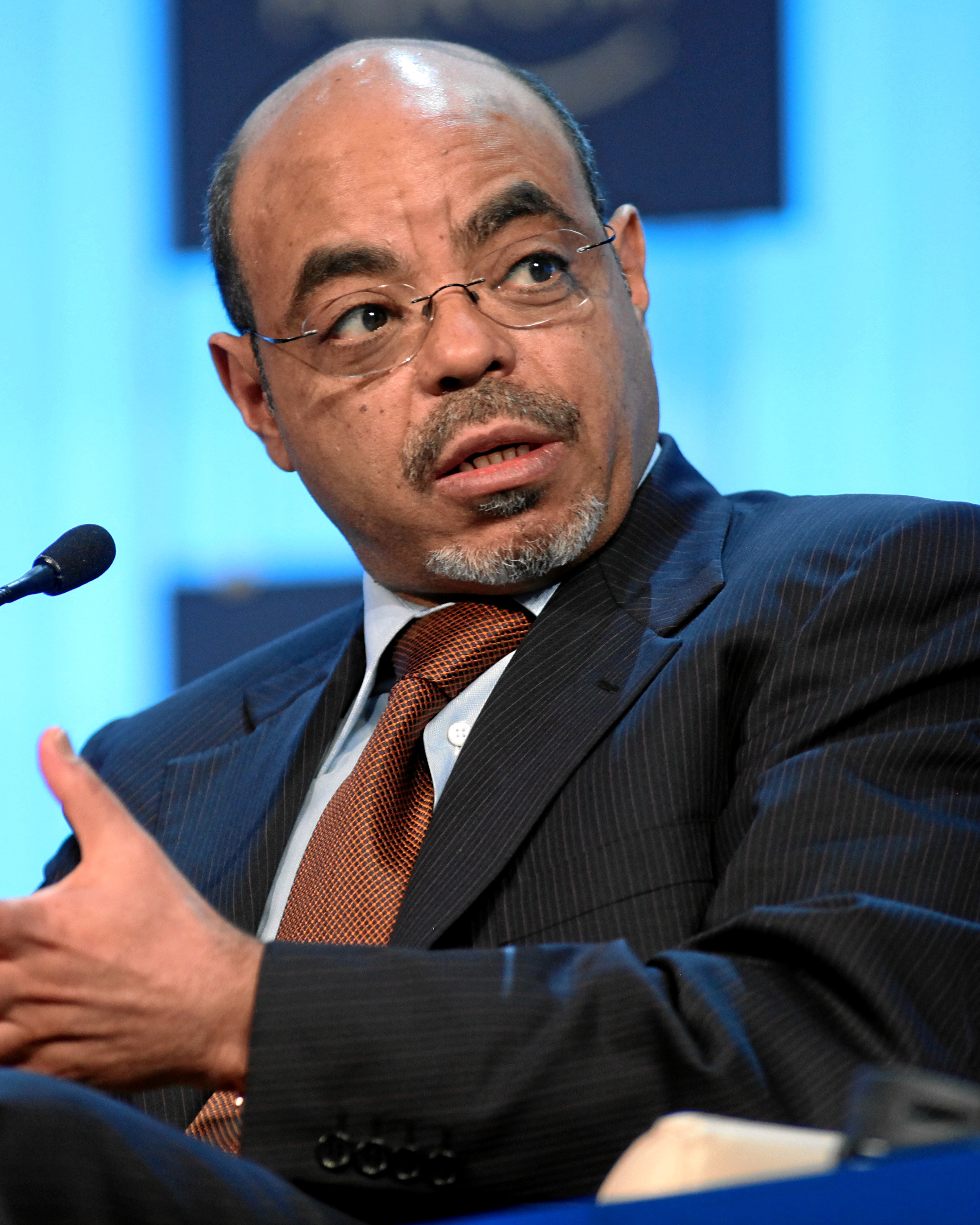
Meles Zenawi in 2012

Many scholars and authors believe that the current source of internal conflict in Ethiopia is the implementation of ethnic federalism since 1991. Evidence suggests the implementation of ethnic federalism "politicized tribal identity" and scholars refuted its application in Ethiopian state context. The Ethiopian People's Revolutionary Democratic Front (EPRDF) believes by applying ethnic federalism, Ethiopia would be safer and peaceful if ethnolinguistic groups granted autonomy while maintaining unity of state. This notion is actively opposed by Ethiopian nationalist groups, contending the present system of ethnic-based government should be changed to non-ethnic and consider individuals as subjects of political order. Notwithstanding, the ruling coalition EPRDF under Meles Zenawi's premiership, took advantage to justify authoritarian dictatorship by initiating crackdowns and jailing opposition groups, concentrating mass media, violating democratic and human rights, and by committing electoral fraud in the 2005 general election.

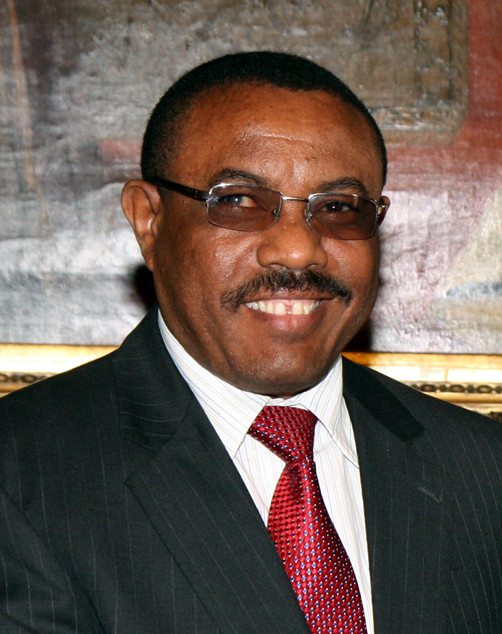
Hailemariam Desalegn succeeded Meles as prime minister shortly after Meles' death in 2012

On 20 August 2012, Meles died in Brussels and was replaced by Hailemariam Desalegn as Prime Minister of Ethiopia, who remained in power as his party was in control of every parliamentary seat. On 15 February 2018, Hailemariam resigned following years-long protests and a state of emergency. He was succeeded by Abiy Ahmed in April 2018. Shortly afterwards, the 42-years old Abiy reformed the country's economy and politics, released political prisoners and opposition group members as well as returned the exiled members, relaxed the press freedom and granted diverse political groups the freedom to mobilize and organize. In 2019, he was awarded Nobel Peace Prize for his contribution of ending the 20-years war between Ethiopia and Eritrea. As opponent of ethnic federalism, his transformative politics saw the reversal of the former regime policies of ethnic-based politics enshrined in the 1995 Constitution. However, it exacerbated competition and resentment over the former coalition parties and pushed the country toward further interethnic tensions. As noted in his 2019 book Medemer, Abiy's initial plan was to merge all ethnic based political parties into one national party what is called Prosperity Party, founded in 2019.

== Afar–Somali clashes ==
In 2014, the federal government under the EPRDF, redrew the boundary between the two regions of Afar Region and the Somali Region. As a result, the Afar Region gained three towns from the Somali Region which has tried to gain them back since. Border clashes in April 2021 killed around 100 civilians.

== Amhara Region ==
On 10–11 January 2019, 58 Qemant people were killed by the Fano militia. The ENDF failed to intervene to stop the massacre.

On 22 June 2019 elements of The Amhara Region's Peace and Security Bureau and allied militias loyal by Brigadier General Asaminew Tsige Chief of the Amhara Region security began a coup d'état. Starting with the targeted assassinations of political and military leaders including Se'are Mekonnen (Chief of the General Staff), Gizae Aberra (Aide-de-camp to the Chief of the General Staff), and Ambachew Mekonnen (Chief Administrator of the Amhara Region). The coup d'état ultimately failed with Asaminew Tsige being killed by police near Bahir Dar 36 hours after the start of the coup.

Throughout much of Western Tigray, security is mostly maintained by uniformed "special forces" from neighboring Amhara states and civil servants have also arrived from Amhara to take over the administration of some Tigrayan towns and cities, a move that risks inflaming ethnic tensions. On 18 December 2020, looting was reported by EEPA, including 500 dairy cows and hundreds of calves stolen by Amhara forces.

On 23 November 2020, an AFP news agency journalist visited the western Tigray town of Humera, and observed that the administration of the conquered parts of Western Tigray was taken over by officials from Amhara region. As of 1 March 2021, several geographical places had been renamed by the new authorities and many residents of Tigrayan ethnicity had been deported to Central Zone. Eyewitnesses report ongoing ethnic cleansing and settlements void of inhabitants.

The Humera massacres in 2020 that killed around 92 people of Tigrayan origin was attributed to Fano and ENDF. The Humera massacres in 2021 that killed Tigrayans were also attributed to Fano and possibly Eritrean soldiers. Fano are also accused of participating in the Mai Kadra massacre, which had both Amhara and Tigrayan victims, while Amnesty International, the Ethiopian Human Rights Commission, and the Ethiopian Human Rights Council attributed it to local Tigrayan youths.

Starting in March 2021 clashes erupted in the town of Ataye after Amhara special forces killed a person on the steps of the main mosque in the city. This started off a wave of inter ethnic clashes that spread throughout the Oromia Zone leading to the deaths of 303 people. On 16 April Clashes once again started after OLA fighters attacked the city of Ataye, The clashes continued for two days leading to the deaths of 281 people and the destruction of a quarter of Ataye.

By November 2021, fighting in the Tigray War had moved south of the Tigray Region into the Amhara Region, leading to a joint military campaign by the Tigray Defense Forces (TDF) and the Oromo Liberation Army (OLA) against federal forces, threatening Addis Ababa, the capital of Ethiopia.

The killings continued through 2021, with people being tortured, tied up and thrown into the Tekeze River. The Italian weekly magazine Panorama published a graphic video in which Amhara soldiers killed a group of 9 people in Humera in August 2021 and then set fire to their bodies. The video also shows torturing of one man by Amhara soldiers, then tying him up, preparing to throw him into the river.

A relation between Amhara militia Fano and the Ethiopian government in post-Tigray War worsened in 2023, culminated in Fano insurgency. In April 2023, efforts by the Ethiopian army to disarm regional forces in Amhara prompted unrest. Fano militiamen fought government forces, with major clashes breaking out on 1 August. Heavy fighting took place in Debre Tabor, Kobo and Gondar. The Ethiopian government declared a six-month state of emergency on 4 August, imposing restrictions on public gathering, gun ownership and media outlets and arresting without providing arrest warrants.

== Benishangul-Gumuz Region ==
Benishangul-Gumuz is home to several different ethnicities including the Gumuz, Berta, Shinasha, Mao, Komo and Fadashi. The Gumuz have had tensions with agricultural Amhara, Oromos, Tigrayans and Agaw migrants, who in Metekel Zone constitute minority ethnic groups with some Amhara groups calling for Metekel to be incorporated into Amhara. Large scale land acquisitions by both local and foreign investors have also pushed the Gumuz off the land.

Gumuz are alleged to have formed militias such as Buadin and the Gumuz Liberation Front that have staged attacks against those seen as "settlers". In the Metekel massacre in December 2020, about 200 mostly Amharas, Oromos, and Shinashas were killed by a suspected Gumuz militia. An unidentified armed group took over the county of Sedal Woreda in the Kamashi Zone of the Benishangul-Gumuz Region in April 2021.

In March 2020, the leader of one of the groups called Fano, Solomon Atanaw, stated that the Fano would not disarm until Benishangul-Gumuz Region's Metekel Zone and the Tigray Region districts of Welkait and Raya are placed under the control of Amhara Region.

== Gambela Region ==
The Gambela Region has seen sporadic fighting over decades between the Anuak, Nuer and migrants from the highlands in what is called the Gambela conflict with about 300 people being killed in 2002 in the Gambela massacre. In June 2022, the OLA and the Gambella Liberation Front (GLF) attacked the region's capital Gambella city.

== Oromia Region ==
On 13 September 2018, clashes broke out in the town of Burayu between various ethnic groups including the Oromo, Amharas, Dorzes, Gamos, Wolayitas, Gurages, and Silt'e. These clashes continued for three days leading to 55 people being killed and 670 people being injured.

After the murder of Oromo singer Hachalu Hundessa on 29 June 2020 in the Gelan Condominiums area of Addis Ababa, protests and riots broke out across the Oromia region. In Hachalu Hundessa's home town of Ambo 83 people were killed in riots. In Shashamane, dozens of buildings were destroyed and at least 150 people were killed in ethnic riots and pogroms.

On 2 November 2020, between 32 and 54 people were killed when an armed group of about 60 men suspected of being members of the Oromo Liberation Army (OLA) gathered 200 people in a schoolyard in the village of Gawa Qanqa before opening fire. The attacks were said to be targeted at Amhara people.

On 5 March 2021, 29 people were killed when a suspected OLA fighter attacked a church in the village of Abo. The OLA denied responsibility saying that the attack was carried out by an OLA splinter group led by Faqadaa Abdiisaa.

On 5 November 2021, the Tigray Defense Forces and Oromo Liberation Army joined with other armed and opposition groups in declaring an alliance against the government known as the United Front of Ethiopian Federalist and Confederalist Forces. The alliance includes the Afar Revolutionary Democratic Unity Front, Agaw Democratic Movement, Benishangul People's Liberation Movement, Gambella Peoples Liberation Army, Global Kimant People Right and Justice Movement/Kimant Democratic Party, Sidama National Liberation Front and the Somali State Resistance. They further pledged to dismantle the government of Prime Minister Abiy, by force if necessary, and form a transitional government. But analysts state that most of the groups “do not have a strong fighting force,” and some of the political groups “have even weaker political programs.” thus making their impact unclear.

Between 30 and 31 August 2022, eyewitnesses said that militants from the Amhara Region (whom they claimed were Fano militias) massacred more than 60 people in Horo Guduru, Western Oromia, and displaced 20,000 more. On 6 September, the Ethiopian Human Rights Commission (EHRC) confirmed this attack happened, though they declined to say whether the attackers were part of Fano.

The administrator of Kiramu district in the East Welega Zone, Fikadu Hunde, alleged that on 15 October 2022, Fano militias entered the district, killing 30 people and burning down over 50 houses. The EHRC learned of this information, but stated that there "was difficulty in verifying and obtaining accurate information due to the lack of network in the area," according to a statement they made to Addis Standard.

== Oromia–Somali clashes ==
Clashes between the two largest regions, the Oromia region, which constitutes primarily those of the Oromo ethnic group, and Somali region, which primarily constitutes those of the Somali ethnic group, began in December 2016 following territorial disputes. Somalis are mostly pastoralists and Oromos tend to be farmers, as well as pastoralists. It has been difficult to demarcate clear borders between the states as pastoral communities tend to cross borders in search of pasture for their animals.

This has led to competition, such as for wells and grazing land, over the years, with tens of thousands of people being displaced in some conflicts. In 2004, a referendum to decide on the fate of more than 420 kebeles, the country's smallest administrative unit, gave 80% of them to Oromia, leading to Somali minorities fleeing those areas.

By 2018, hundreds of people were killed and 200,000 fled their homes from the resulting conflict. The regional special police of both states, called the Liyu in the Somali region and the Liyu Hail of Oromia state, were both accused of committing atrocities.

== Somali Region ==
With the succession of Abiy Ahmed to the position of Prime Minister friction began to build between the federal government and Somali regional governments due to Ahmed's reformist vision which clashed with Abdi Mohamed Omar (Abdi Illey) who had ruled over the region with an iron fist for the past 8 years. Despite attempts to negotiate a path forward, the tension between the two men would boil over, when in late July 2018, Abdi Illey ordered the Liyu Police to enter into Dire Dawa, an Ethiopian city outside of the Somali region's jurisdiction. The Liyu police, up to this point, had mainly been a counterinsurgency force created by the federal government in 2007 to help fight the Ogaden National Liberation Front and were commanded by then Somali regional security chief Abdi Mohammed Omar who would later become the region's president in 2010. Although he was no longer the region's security chief, the Liyu would still continue to report to him. In response to the "illegal act," federal forces confronted the Liyu and entered Jijiga on August 4.

In November 2021, the Somali State Resistance allied with the Tigray People's Liberation Front and UFEFCF.

In July 2022, the Islamist militant group al-Shabaab launched an invasion from Somalia into Ethiopia's Somali Region; the invasion was the largest attack by al-Shabaab in Ethiopian territory to date.

== Tigray Region ==
The Tigray Regional Government was led by the Tigray People's Liberation Front (TPLF), which formerly dominated the Ethiopian People's Revolutionary Democratic Front coalition. Hostilities between the central government and the TPLF escalated after the TPLF rejected the federal government's decision to postpone the elections scheduled for August 2020 until mid-2021 because of the COVID-19 pandemic. The TPLF accused the government of violating the Ethiopian constitution.

The TPLF carried out its own regional elections, winning all contested seats in the region's parliament. In the months before November 2020, Abiy moved troops toward Tigray and sent military cargo planes into Eritrea. Behind closed doors, his advisers and military generals debated the merits of a conflict. Those who disagreed were fired, interrogated at gunpoint or forced to leave.

After attacks on the Northern Command by armed forces loyal to the TPLF, which the TPLF called a pre-emptive strike, the Ethiopian National Defense Force (ENDF) launched an offensive, capturing Mekelle, the capital of Tigray in November 2020. The ENDF was assisted by forces from neighboring Eritrea.

After half a year of guerilla campaign, the TPLF launched a counter-offensive and by July 2021 recaptured Mekelle in Operation Alula. By 31 October 2021, the TDF had claimed to have taken the strategically located city of Kombolcha, 380 kilometres from Addis Ababa, as well as the nearby city of Dessie. The government denied the claims, reporting that fighting was still going on in and around the two cities. The Ethiopian government further claimed that as the TDF entered Kombolcha, they massacred more than 100 youths. TPLF spokesperson Getachew Reda denied the claim.

On 2 November 2021, as the counter-offensive entered federal-controlled territory, the Ethiopian government declared a six-month state of emergency, allowing arrests without a court warrant, curfews, censorship, restrictions on movement, and conscription of adults. Authorities in Addis Ababa also instructed residents to register their weapons, while four other regional governments called for arms. On 5 November, the TPLF, OLA, and other rebel groups formed a nine-group coalition called the United Front of Ethiopian Federalist and Confederalist Forces.

On 22 November, Prime Minister Abiy said he would lead the fight against the rebels after the TDF captured Shewa Robit, calling it "the final stages of saving Ethiopia." Many countries urged citizens to leave the country. From 26 November to 6 December, Ethiopian allied forces recaptured several towns in Amhara and Afar, including Lalibela and Shewa Robit. On 6 December, government forces claimed Dessie and Kombolcha, later confirmed by the TPLF as a strategic withdrawal. By the end of December, federal forces had repelled the advance toward Addis Ababa, pushing Tigrayan forces back to Tigray.

On 20 December, the TPLF announced withdrawal from Amhara and Afar to create "a decisive opening for peace," requesting a no-fly zone and weapons embargo. The Ethiopian Air Force began bombing campaigns in January 2022, killing civilians in Tigray. Opposition leaders were released on 7 January, and the state of emergency was proposed to end on 26 January. On 24 March, the government declared a humanitarian truce, but talks broke down by August, with renewed fighting along Tigray's borders.

On 24 March 2022, the Ethiopian government declared an indefinite humanitarian truce, in order to allow the delivery of humanitarian aid into Tigray. During the ceasefire, both Ethiopia and the TPLF agreed to have talks about an official end to the war. A number of outstanding issues – in particular, the presence of pro-government troops in Tigray's Western Zone and restoring access to basic public service to Tigray – were topics of discussion throughout. Though there were initial hopes of finding a peaceful solution to ending the war, the talks soon became characterized by steadily increasing hostilities between the negotiation parties. By August, talks started to break down, with both the Ethiopian government and the TPLF accusing each other of refusing to make peace.

In September 2022, Eritrea joined the offensive, capturing Sheraro and displacing 210,000 people. Airstrikes on Mekelle and other towns killed civilians. The TPLF redeployed troops to resist the northern offensive. By October, strategic towns including Shire, Alamata, Korem, Adwa, and Axum were captured by Ethiopian and Eritrean forces. Peace talks in South Africa began in late October, and a cessation of hostilities was announced on 3 November 2022. Despite the agreement, Amhara and Eritrean forces continued attacks in the months that followed. In late January 2026, clashes erupted in the Tigray region. Fighting involved Tigrayan forces and Ethiopian federal troops supported by Amhara militias in parts of western Tigray that Amhara forces had not withdrawn from despite the 2022 Pretoria peace agreement. Diplomatic sources confirmed the clashes but said the situation on the ground remained unclear.

=== 2026 Ethiopian Peoples' Forces Alliance for Survival ===
On 20 September 2026, seven Ethiopian opposition and armed groups formally announced the formation of the Ethiopian People's Forces Alliance for Survival (EPFAS), a cross-regional alliance seeking to remove the Prosperity Party-led government of Prime Minister Abiy Ahmed and establish an inclusive transitional government. The alliance consists of the Amhara Fano National Movement, Oromo Liberation Army (OLA), Tigray People's Liberation Front (TPLF), Ogaden National Liberation Front (ONLF), Afar Revolutionary Democratic Unity Front, Benishangul People's Liberation Movement and Gumuz People's Democratic Movement, bringing together groups from several of Ethiopia's major regional and ethnic constituencies, including former battlefield enemies from the Tigray War. The coalition said the alliance was formed in response to what it described as widespread insecurity, armed conflict, displacement, poverty, civilian suffering and the erosion of democratic and human rights under the federal government, while several member groups have accused the government of increasing the centralization of political power and marginalizing Ethiopia's regions. The formation followed years of conflict in Amhara, Oromia and Tigray, alongside reports of civilian deaths, abuses by security forces and armed groups, restrictions on independent media and civil society, and declining political and civil liberties. The alliance stated that, following the removal of the existing government, it intended to establish a transitional administration governed by a Transitional Charter, end ongoing armed conflicts and organize an inclusive constitutional dialogue. A faction of the ONLF denied joining the coalition, saying that they remain committed to the government-sponsored peace process.

The emergence of a multi-regional armed coalition seeking to replace Ethiopia's central government has historical parallels with the formation of the Ethiopian People's Revolutionary Democratic Front (EPRDF) during the final years of the Ethiopian Civil War. The EPRDF was established in 1989 around the TPLF and other ethnically based opposition movements before its forces advanced across Ethiopia and captured Addis Ababa on 28 May 1991, bringing about the fall of the Derg regime after President Mengistu Haile Mariam fled the country. The 2026 alliance similarly joins armed organizations drawn from several regions around a declared objective of replacing the incumbent government and establishing a transitional political order, although its members retain significant political, territorial and ideological differences.

On the night of 22 to 23 September, Tigrayan forces reportedly took control of the Alula Aba Nega Airport in Mekelle from federal police, according to local sources cited by Reuters. Ethiopian Airlines suspended its flights to Mekelle, as well as to Shire and Axum, citing the situation in the Tigray Region. Getachew Reda, a cabinet minister and adviser to Ethiopia's prime minister, condemned the TPLF's actions, describing the attacks as "heartbreaking".
