= 2026 Ethiopian offensive =

- Part of the Ethiopian civil conflict (2018–present)
- Controlled by Ethiopia (ENDF and allied militias) Controlled by the Tigray Defense Forces (TDF) and Eritrean Defense Forces (EDF) Controlled by the Oromo Liberation Army (OLA) Controlled by the Fano (Amhara Militia) Controlled by the Afar National Unity Revolutionary Front (ANURF) (For an up-to-date, interactive, detailed map, see here.)
Date	23 September 2026 – present; (1 month, 4 weeks and 2 days)
Location	Ethiopia and Eritrea
Status	Ongoing
Territorial changes	ENDF military control of part of Tigray; 2026 Eritrean incursion into Ethiopia

Belligerents
Ethiopia; Tigray Peace and Change Council	Ethiopian Peoples' Forces Coalition for Survival; Eritrea

Commanders and leaders
(Ethiopia) Abiy Ahmed (Ethiopia) Birhanu Jula; Getachew Reda	Debretsion Gebremichael; Zemene Kassie; Ibrahim Osman Aliyu (Eritrea) Isaias Afwerki (Eritrea) Filipos Woldeyohannes

Units involved
Federal government; ENDF; Ethiopian Air Force; Ethiopian Army; Ethiopian Federal Police; Amhara riot police; Tigray Peace Force; Local militias	Ethiopian Peoples' Forces Coalition for Survival; TPLF; Tigray Defense Forces; Fano; Amhara Fano National Movement; Afar National Unity Revolutionary Front; (Eritrea) EDF; Eritrean Army

Casualties and losses
Per Fano: 10 military trucks captured 2 military trucks destroyed	Fano: Several casualties Per Ethiopia: 272 killed, 260 wounded

On 23 September 2026, the Ethiopian Peoples' Forces Coalition for Survival, a coalition of various Ethiopian rebel and insurgent groups, launched a large-scale military offensive against the Ethiopian National Defense Force (ENDF) in Tigray, Afar and Amhara. The Tigray People's Liberation Front (TPLF) described the offensive as a defensive war against the federal government of Ethiopia.

The TPLF took control of several towns bordering Tigray Region. Control shifted back to federal forces, with the ENDF retaking control of Afar towns and capturing the Tigray capital Mekelle. Eritrean troops entered Tigray while the ENDF continued advancing north in Tigray Region.

The offensive is the largest escalation in fighting since the Tigray war (2020–2022), which was one of the bloodiest conflicts of the 21st century.

== Background ==
=== Tigray war and Pretoria agreement ===
The TPLF was effectively the ruling party of Ethiopia, dominating the Ethiopian People's Revolutionary Democratic Front (EPRDF) from 1991 to 2018. In 2018, Abiy Ahmed was elected leader of the EPRDF and thus became prime minister. The Tigray war took place under Abiy's leadership from November 2020 to November 2022, when Ethiopia and the TPLF signed the Pretoria agreement. The situation remained unstable, with officials from the Amhara Region continuing to occupy Western Tigray and the government launching a series of drone strikes in 2025 while the TPLF amassed troops at the border.

In May 2025, the National Election Board of Ethiopia (NEBE) revoked the TPLF's registration as a political party, despite the TPLF being a signatory, alongside the federal government, to the November 2022 Pretoria Agreement that ended the Tigray War. In response, the TPLF declared the restoration of the pre-war administration and installed the TPLF's chairman Debretsion Gebremichael as Tigray's regional president, creating a rival government to that of the pro-government Interim Regional Administration of Tigray.

=== 2026 clashes and escalation ===
In late January and early February 2026, days-long clashes erupted in Tigray between the TPLF and the ENDF, in what Armed Conflict Location and Event Data (ACLED) described as the most significant fighting between the two since full-scale war. Relations between the central government and TPLF continued to deteriorate, and by mid-July the TPLF declared the Pretoria agreement "effectively dead".

On 1 August, a battle lasting several hours broke out between the ENDF and the TPLF near the Sudan border. In subsequent weeks, the ENDF carried out numerous drone strikes in Tigray. The regional capital of Mekelle was hit by a series of drone strikes in late August, including an attack on 20 August against a residential compound with no obvious military targets that wounded 13 civilians.

== Prelude ==
=== Declaration of the Ethiopian People's Forces Coalition for Survival ===
Logo for EPFAS

On 20 September 2026, the formal declaration of an alliance of Ethiopian rebel groups from Tigray and the Somali Region, named the Ethiopian People's Forces Coalition for Survival (EPFAS)—alternatively "Tsimdo" or the "Alliance for Survival"—was announced. Reported to contain between 6 and 8 members, the coalition was declared to comprise the:

- Amhara Fano National Movement (AFNM)
- Tigray Defense Forces/Tigray People's Liberation Front (TDF/TPLF)
- Oromo Liberation Army (OLA)
- Ogaden National Liberation Front (denied by Qalbidhagax-led faction, ONLF) (Note: The Ogaden National Liberation Front has denied joining the coalition.)
- Afar Revolutionary Democratic Unity Front (per Al Jazeera English and Critical Threats Project, ARDUF/Ugugumo) or the Afar National Unity Revolutionary Front (per Addis Standard and Al Jazeera English, ANURF)
- Benishangul People's Liberation Front/Benishangul People's Liberation Movement (BPLF/BPLM)
- Gumuz People's Democratic Movement (denied, GPDM).

The coalition, consisting of some members which fought against each other during the 2020–2022 Tigray war, pledged to overthrow the Abiy Ahmed-led government towards establishing a transitional government. On 26 September, GPDM denied membership of the coalition, claiming it had no military apparatus. The Abdirahman Mohamed Sheikh Mahdi-led ONLF faction asserted ONLF membership of the coalition, which the Jijiga-based ONLF faction led by Abdikarin Sheikh Muse Qalbidhagax denied.

== Offensive ==
=== 22–28 September 2026: Early EPFAS gains repelled thereafter by ENDF counteroffensive ===
Primary points of fighting between 22 and 28 September, including airport seizures Regions: Afar, Tigray, Amhara

On 22 September 2026, the ENDF launched drone attacks on EPFAS positions, including on a school in Alamata which killed 14 civilians and injured 22 more—hostilities which the TDF/TPLF labelled an "open invasion" before claiming it would respond with a "defensive war." The following morning, 23 September, the EPFAS—primarily including TDF/TPLF fighters—launched an offensive on government positions first along the Kobo–Tumuga front, then along the border of the Afar and Amhara regions. They additionally seized the airports of Axum, Shire, and Mekelle (Alula Aba Nega Airport)—which are all located in northern Tigray; the captures and halting of flight services cut the ENDP's only means of sending reinforcements directly into the Tigray region. This initial offensive was relatively successful initially, capturing Abala and the Erebti District on 22 and 27 September, respectively. Successful attacks would also reach down into northeastern Amhara Region.

The ENDF halted EPFAS approaches towards the Amhara Region's North Wollo Zone capital town of Weldiya, moving troops north along the A2 highway connecting Weldiya to Mekelle—the axis along which most of the fighting had taken place. The rebels did make some advances, EPFAS forces opened another front in the Wag Hemra Zone, in western Amhara region—on 24 September, which was largely under government control. This movement marked an ENDF success on the eastern front, which was replicated in the west, where the ENDF repelled forces from the Amhara to the Tigray Region, having recaptured the town of Soqota on 27 September. Furthermore, they succeeded in containing battles along the Tigray border. This was illustrated by the fact that hostilities continued in Abala, Mekelle, and Lalibela while new fighting broke out only in the northeast of the North Wollo Zone. The ENDF soon launched a counter offensive and began entering Tigray, with pro-government forces capturing Alamata on 28 September, during which at least 52 civilians were killed.

=== 29 September–11 October 2026: Addis Ababa strikes, Eritrean troops and continued hostilities ===
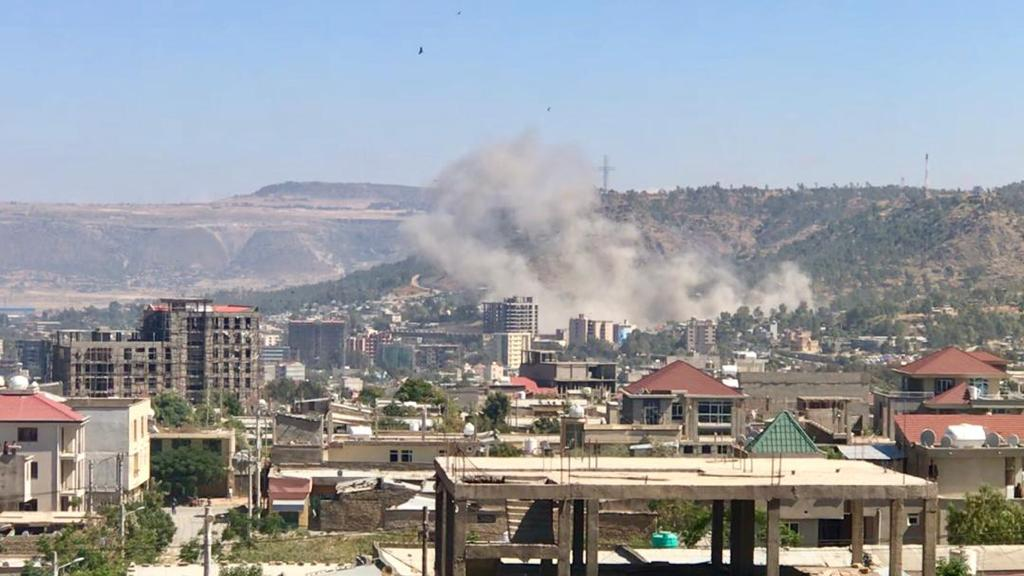
Towns and cities like Mekelle, including the civilian victims therein, were also targets during the Tigray war.

Despite accusations by the Ethiopian government of Eritrea's financial and diplomatic collaboration with rebels, Eritrean officials denied involvement in the formation of the coalition. Ethiopian officials accused Eritrea of troop presence in northern Ethiopia beginning on 29 September. ACLED and witnesses speaking to Reuters and The Guardian reported Eritrean troops entering Tigray on 7 October. However, ties between Eritrea and Ethiopia broke down before this confirmation, when on 1 October, deep-penetration drone attacks orchestrated by EPFAS exploded in Addis Ababa, primarily targeting military air facilities. The attacks served to stretch ENDF resources and displace focus away from the primary theaters of battle near Tigray Region. In response, the Ethiopian foreign ministry closed its embassy in Asmara after accusing Eritrea of "direct and indirect hostility," causing the de facto breaking of diplomatic ties between Ethiopia and Eritrea.

ENDF forces continued to approach Mekelle through the A2 highway, with hostilities beginning near the road—between Korem and Maychew. By 30 September, the ENDF had reportedly captured Abala, Korem, and other positions along the A2. On the eastern front, the ENDF secured control of Abala and Erebti by 1 October. The recapture precluded an EPFAS advance to sever the A1 highway to Djibouti, whose port handles 90% of Ethiopian imports and exports. EPFAS withdrew forces positioned along the A1 to defend the A2 and Mekelle—with a pro-government militia commander and Horn Review stating that the rebel forces would soon be reinforced by Eritrean troops arriving through the Assab–Bure front to the border Afar towns of Berhale and Dallol, reaching up to 20 km (12 mi) away from Adigrat. Between 3 and 4 October, the ENDF recaptured Alula Aba Nega Airport in Mekelle and surrounded the city before EPFAS troops abandoned it.

Following ENDF mobilizations along the Eritrean border following the EPFAS retreat from Adigrat on 5 October, the ENDF attacked EDF troops traveling towards Idaga Hamus with drones. The EDF arrived in Idaga Hamus on 7 October. ENDF troops occupied Agula, previously occupied by the TPLF. The following day, on 8 October, more Eritrean troops were seen arriving, having passed through Zalambessa. The ENDF attacked EDF troops with drones on both 7 and 8 October. The ENDF captured Wukro, crossed the Tekezé River and occupied Adi Gebru. Attacks on Eritrean forces' positions caused them, according to a witness speaking with Agence France-Presse (AFP), to retreat north following ENDF attacks on 9 October. The following day, on 10 October, the ENDF regained control of Adigrat. A witness told Agence France-Presse that Eritrean forces appeared to retreat north following ENDF attacks. On 9 October, Fano forces captured Anchekorer. On 10 October the ENDF regained control of Adigrat. The EDF held positions north of Adigrat. On 11 October, ENDF and TPF took control of Adwa.

An Ethiopian government source told UMD Media that on 11 October the ENDF occupied the Eritrean border village of Deba Sima in the Southern Denkalya subregion, 50 kilometres (31 mi) from Assab. Afar locals speaking to UMD Media disputed that the ENDF had done so. On 14 October, Fano claimed to have captured the town of Meragna in Amhara's North Shewa Zone.

=== 12–31 October 2026: continued ENDF advance ===
ENDF troops took control of Zalambessa on 12 October. EPFAS troops had left earlier. EPFAS troops took control of Fatsi, Adi Daero, Adi Nbried, Adi Hageray, and Adi Awala. The UN Security Council (UNSC) held a closed-door meeting on the situation in the Horn of Africa. The Security Council Report (SCR) argued that UNSC members seemed "increasingly concerned about the interstate dimension of the recent escalation".

On 16 October, Ethiopian prime minister Abiy Ahmed announced the formation of a new interim government for the Tigray Region intended to operate for six months before holding elections. Four chief executives were appointed, with the President of the Executive Committee position expected to rotate between the four. Most of the officials appointed to the interim government had previously split from the TPLF.

Clashes were reported in the city of Aksum, around 31 October, seizing weapons, ammunition and food supplies. The TPLF claimed to have killed 500 soldiers, including 2 commanders, and wounding 800 government forces. Ethiopian government forces has not verified the casualty claims. Internet services were disrupted as result from the fighting.

=== November 2026–present: continued fighting in Tigray ===
Fighting has still continued in the Tigray region in November, with heavy artillery fire persistently conducted in the Sheraro region. Reports also say the TPLF is preparing a counteroffensive.

On 6 November, the interim government has imposed an indefinite nighttime curfew restriction, prohibiting residents from moving outside their property from 7:00 pm to 6:00 am.

Around 13-14 November, it was reported that the ENDF and Eritrean forces exchanged drone strikes and artillery fire in the town of Badme.

== Peace process ==
The takeover of the three Tigray Region airports by Tigrayan forces was a violation of the Pretoria Agreement according to the African Union (AU) Commission (AUC) chairperson, Mahamoud Ali Youssouf. On 23 September 2026, Youssouf requested Olusegun Obasanjo, African Union High Representative for the Horn of Africa, to carry out negotiations to preserve the peace process. On 2 October, Amnesty International called for the AU Peace and Security Council to hold an emergency session, arguing that the AU "was one of the guarantors" of the Pretoria Agreement.

== Consequences ==
=== Withdrawal from Somalia ===
Bloomberg reported that Ethiopia plans to withdraw 3,000 soldiers from Somalia. Somalia said it had been not informed of such plans. It was not immediately known whether or how a withdrawal would impact the African Union Support and Stabilization Mission in Somalia or other, bilateral deployments.

=== Diplomatic crisis with Eritrea ===
On 1 October 2026, the Ethiopian Ministry of Foreign Affairs announced it was shutting its embassy in Asmara due to the alleged Eritrean involvement in the conflict and expelled 10 diplomats ordering them to leave the country within 48 hours and declaring them as persona non grata. In response, Eritrea announced the severance of all diplomatic ties with its Ministry of Foreign Affairs saying on X that it, "had no choice but to reciprocate". Eritrea stated that one of its fears was that Ethiopia would utilize the conflict to initiate an offensive on the port of Assab, and added that Ethiopia's latest escalations signified a "publicly pronounced declaration of war" and an attempt at regime change.

On 5 October, Abiy was sworn in for another term as Prime Minister of Ethiopia, and in a speech immediately after he stated that he would "work diligently to ensure that Ethiopia has an outlet to the sea".

== Humanitarian crisis ==
=== Food insecurity and famine ===
Beginning with the onset of the Tigray war in November 2020, acute food shortages leading to death and starvation became widespread in northern Ethiopia, and the Tigray, Afar and Amhara Regions in particular. While the situation improved after the March 2022 truce and allowed for humanitarian distribution of food, the lack of rain in the spring of 2022 compounded the already existing food insecurity. The resurgence of fighting after the ceasefire collapsed in August 2022 exacerbated the situation even more; by October, between 400 and 900 a day were dying of starvation. As of October 2026, areas in the southern Tigray were facing droughts which prolonged food insecurity into "crisis-level conditions" as classified by Phase 3 of the Integrated Food Security Phase Classification (IPC). Fighting disrupted fuel supplies, market activity, transportation, harvests—physically and monetarily restricting access to food, farmland, labor opportunities, and other essential goods. According to the Famine Early Warning Systems Network (FEWS NET), these conditions risked the IPC Phase 3 conditions continuing.

=== Internet and telephone access ===
Due to the intense fighting in Northern Ethiopia, the internet connection in the area was disrupted, alongside telephone lines, which prevented news agencies and families from contacting external regions and individuals within the region itself.

=== Displacement ===
On 22 October, Kenyan police reports that about a hundred Ethiopians have fled to Kenya following gunfights and violence in Moyale. The Kenya Red Cross Society has set up temporary shelters and distributing foods such as cereal and porridge flour as response.

== War crimes ==
According to Human Rights Watch (HRW), the ENDF 20 August strike against the Daero area of Mekelle, during the leadup to the September conflict, was "unlawfully indiscriminate" since it had "no evident military targets". HRW's evidence included interviews with three survivors, two medical workers, and two residents, and analysis of photographic, video, and satellite evidence. The 20 August attack was the dropping of a bomb by an aircraft on a residential compound for teachers around 11:00 local time. A 4 m (13 ft) diameter crater resulted from the bombing.

HRW recommended investigation into the 20 August Daero attack as a possible war crime.

Witnesses speaking to The Guardian reported a campaign of forced recruitment by rebels in Tigray, including the conscription at gunpoint of children as young as 15.

== Reactions ==
- Australia: The Department of Foreign Affairs advised its citizens against unnecessary travel to Ethiopia, and issued a Do Not Travel warning to the conflict areas.
- United States: According to Washington Examiner, the United States (US) advised its citizens against traveling to the Tigray and Afar regions and prohibited U.S. government personnel from traveling there. The United States Department of State released a statement urging both Ethiopia and Eritrea to show restraint, citing cross-border "tensions".
- United Nations: UN Commissioner for Human Rights, Volker Türk urged all parties to immediately de-escalate tensions and prevent a return to full scale war.
- Vatican City: Pope Leo XIV extended a plea to "all parties to choose the path of dialogue" and expressed hope for international humanitarian aid.

== Analysis ==
=== EPFAS intentionality and capabilities ===
Critical Threats concluded that the EPFAS "offensive likely aims to consolidate the [TDF/TPLF]’s control of Tigray and its rear supply lines, relieve federal pressure on the region, and pressure key federal supply lines."

Despite concluding that EPFAS would indeed concern the government and would likely not agree to de-escalation measures, experts from the International Crisis Group (ICG) questioned the group's collaborative capabilities. The Dynamics International Group corroborated that the "show of force and unity and military preparedness to wage asymmetrical warfare," underscored by being "unlikely to match the military power of the ENDF," would make their insurgency likely to only reach through the "short to mid-term period." Dynamics International said short-term intensification could occur thanks to foreign involvement from Egypt, Sudan, and Eritrea.

=== Predictions of regionalization ===
Following the Sudanese government's accusation of Ethiopian involvement in March 2026, Alan Boswell of the International Crisis Group (ICG), predicting the beginning of the Ethiopian offensive, said that it "could merge with the conflict raging in Sudan, creating an unpredictable regional conflagration." Experts from The Soufan Center (TSC) added that the "porous borders" of countries within the Horn.

Boswell underscored that Saudi Arabia and the UAE's backing of belligerents in the Horn of Africa "ma[de] the situation even more combustible."

==== Expansion to Eritrea ====
Modern Diplomacy argued on 4 October that the fighting in Ethiopia and that in Yemen should be considered a single conflict, given overlapping interests of Red Sea actors like Egypt; it said conflicts "merge when they share terrain, patrons and consequences". It forecast a 25% chance of war reaching the coast with an Ethiopian advance towards Assab, and 75% chance of either a contained, intrastate conflict in Ethiopia or a broad, negotiated settlement. It argued the latter would require mediation by the AU and Gulf states, including Saudi Arabia, and a long-term port deal for Ethiopia through Assab, Berbera or Djibouti.

Abdurahman Sayed, Director of the Horn of Africa Centre for Regional Integration, stated that Ethiopia wanted Eritrea to get involved in order to seize the opportunity to occupy the strategic port of Assab; He further stated that the Eritrean troops did not necessarily need to actually be in Ethiopian territory to fabricate a casus belli.

The Albanian news service Nacionale stated that unnamed analysts warned about Eritrea possibly being dragged into the war, also noting the expanding ongoing Ethiopian mobilization on the Eritrean border.

==== Ethiopian involvement in the Sudanese Civil War ====
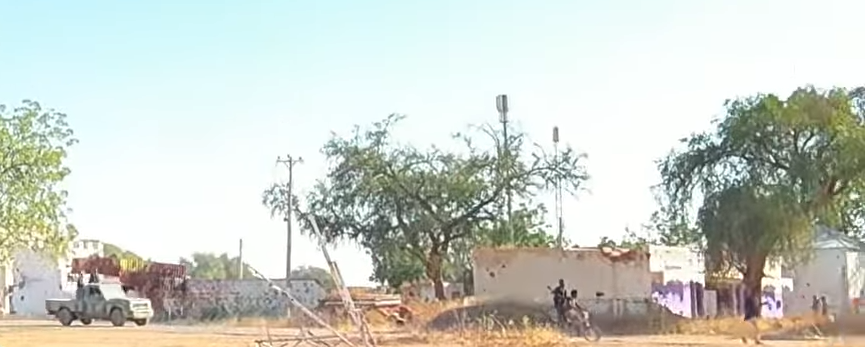
RSF fighters in El Fasher, where they perpetrated a massacre in 2025, a couple years after doing the same in Geneina, in 2023; the present phase of the Sudanese civil war has seen massive civilian deaths, marked by numerous war crimes and genocide.

Ethiopia westerly borders Sudan, which has been entrenched in a civil war since 2023. Two primary belligerents, the Rapid Support Forces (RSF) and the Sudanese Armed Forces (SAF), fight along an East–West divide. Ethiopia involved itself in the present conflict in February 2026, when researchers from Reuters conducted a visual investigation revealing Ethiopia's hosting of a training camp for RSF militants, set along the two countries' border, specifically the Blue Nile State, where the RSF since launched a new front. Compounded by accusations of Ethiopian-launched drone strikes into Sudan, the Sudanese government subsequently accused Ethiopia of its involvement in the civil war a month later, in March. Ethiopia's support for the RSF facilitated the RSF's efforts in the southeastern front it launched in January, along Sudan's border with Ethiopia, including allowing the RSF to launch offensives from Ethiopian territory as reported in August. Foreign involvement has been a cornerstone of the civil war's intractability, with primary funding of the SAF coming from Saudi Arabia and the RSF from the United Arab Emirates (UAE)—funding which has been labelled as containing elements of proxy conflict, extractivism, and a Saudi Arabian-Emirati rivalry.

==== Somali Civil War spillover into Ethiopia ====
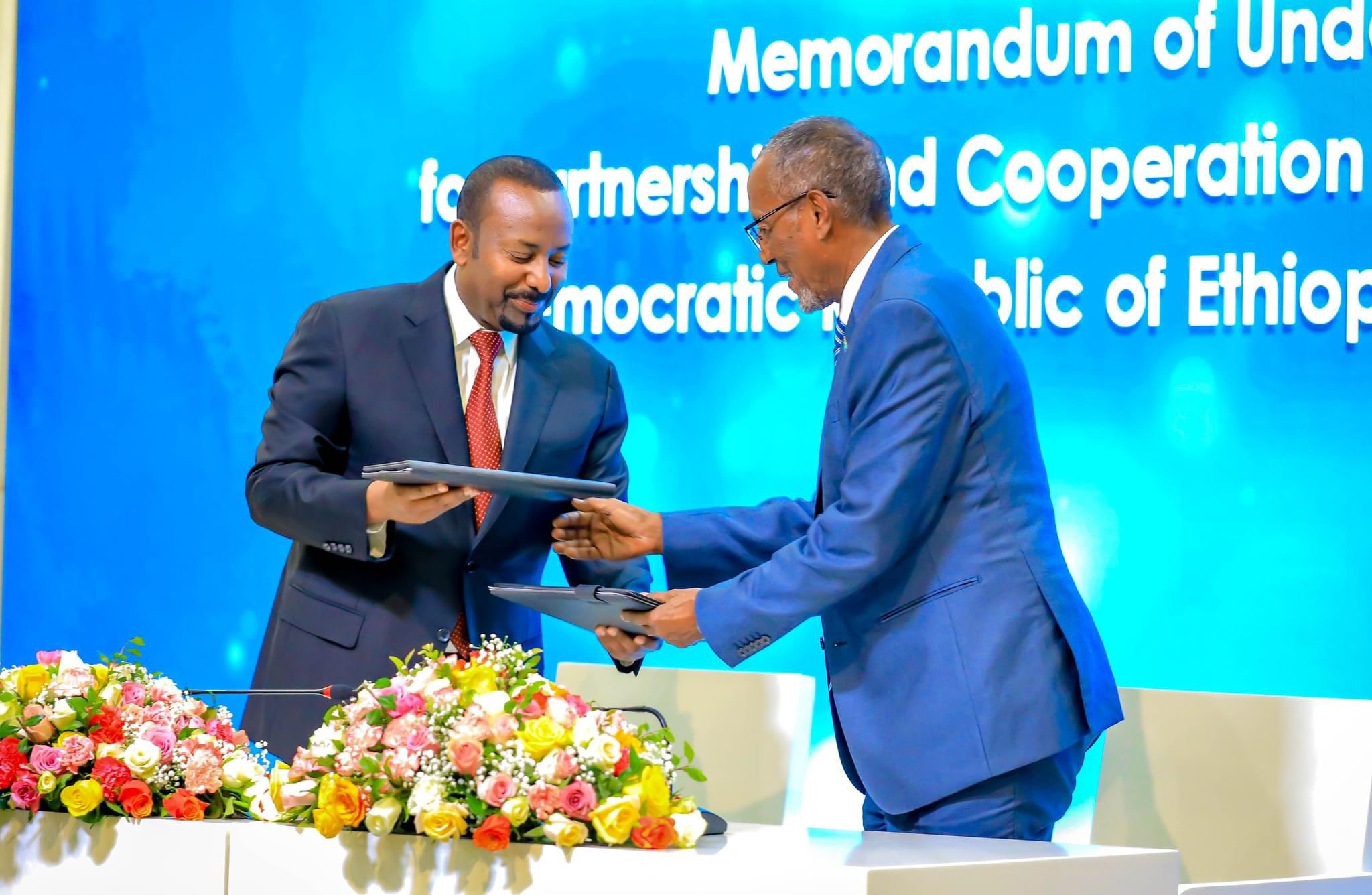
Ethiopian Prime Minister Abiy Ahmed (left) and Somaliland President Muse Bihi Abdi (right) exchanging the MoU after its signing

Ethiopia easterly borders Somalia, which has also entrenched in a civil war since between 1978 and 1991, with the present phase beginning in 2009. It is being fought between the internationally-recognized Somali government's military wing, the Somali National Army (SNA); the Somali Future Council, an opposition coalition; Islamic State (IS)-affiliated groups including al-Shabaab and Somalia Wilayah; and the self-declared state of Somaliland. On the military front, Al-Shabaab regained much of its territorial losses in the 2022–2023 government offensive thanks it part to deepening ties with the Houthis in Yemen—another ongoing conflict being waged across the Bab al-Mandab Strait from the Horn and more recently within it, since September 2026—risking escalation in the Somali civil war, as further complicated by warnings of the African Union (AU) Support and Stabilization Mission's (AUSSOM) potential collapse following the cessation of US funding beyond December of that year. On the diplomatic front, Ethiopia and Somaliland signed a memorandum of understanding (MoU) in January 2024, giving Ethiopia access to the Red Sea through the Port of Berbera in return for its recognition of Somaliland. Despite agreeing to restore bilateral relations through the Ankara Declaration—signed in Turkey that following December—through which it restating its recognition of Somalia's sovereign territory, analysts underscored that it created a precarious peace.

== See also ==
- 2026 Mali offensives
- 2026 Yemen offensives
- El Alamein Declaration
