= Ethiopian Peoples' Forces Coalition for Survival =

Rebel military and politician coalition in Ethiopia

Tsimdo
- Logo used in the official documents of the Alliance
- Type: Rebel military coalition
- Effective: September 2026
- Parties: AFNM; OLA; TPLF; ONLF; ANURF; BPLM; GPDM (disputed) Alleged support: Egypt; Eritrea; Sudan

Tsimdo (Tigrinya: ጽምዶ, romanized: tṣǝmǝdo, lit. 'engagement'), officially the Ethiopian Peoples' Forces Coalition for Survival, or Ethiopian Peoples' Alliance for Survival, is an Ethiopian rebel political and military coalition formed in late 2025. The coalition was formally declared in September 2026, following earlier statements by Ethiopian authorities that described the coalition as existing between Fano, the Oromo Liberation Army (OLA), and the Tigray People's Liberation Front (TPLF). The coalition aims to overthrow the federal government of Ethiopia led by Prime Minister Abiy Ahmed.

== Creation ==
=== Prelude ===
Tsimdo first came to public attention when it was discussed in an open letter by Ethiopian foreign minister Gedion Timothewos to UN Secretary-General António Guterres dated 2 October 2025. In the letter, Timothewos accused the TPLF and the Eritrean government of organizing and augmenting a rebel alliance known as Tsimdo and actively supporting a Fano offensive during the Fano insurgency.

According to Africa Intelligence, in May 2026, a public political meeting held under the banner of "Tsimdo" took place in Port Sudan, among those who attended were Sudanese army officers, Eritrean government officials and several Ethiopian opposition figures. Eritrean-backed media described the event as a "grassroots initiative" aimed at promoting peaceful coexistence and conflict resolution between peoples in Ethiopia, Eritrea and Sudan.

In a statement on 5 June 2026, the Ethiopian government accused the Oromo Liberation Army (OLA) and Fano of attempting to disrupt the 2026 Ethiopian general election and destabilize the country with the help of foreign backers. The next day, Chief of Staff of the Ethiopian National Defense Force (ENDF) Field Marshal Berhanu Jula delivered a speech at the graduation of members of the security forces, during which he referred to Tsimdo as a "combined convergence" of Ethiopia's "historical enemies", he also accused "actors from Cairo" of being involved.

In July 2026, neither the Eritrean government nor the TPLF had publicly confirmed the existence of any formal alliance.

=== Official declaration ===
The alliance was formally announced on 20 September 2026, as the "Ethiopian Peoples' Forces Coalition for Survival". The alliance was announced to include seven members: the TPLF, OLA, ONLF, Amhara Fano National Movement (AFNM), Benishangul People's Liberation Movement (BPLM), Gumuz People's Democratic Movement (GPDM), and an Afar group.

==== Membership disputes ====
As of late September 2026, media disagreed on which Afar organisation is a member of the coalition. Addis Standard stated on 20 September that the ethnic Afar contingent of the coalition is the Afar National Unity Revolutionary Front (ANURF), while Al Jazeera English stated on 23 September that the Afar group is the Afar Revolutionary Democratic Unity Front (ARDUF). Mohamed Kheir Omer, writing in Al Jazeera English on 25 September, stated that the group was ANURF, led by Ibrahim Osman Aliyu.

On 21 September, the faction of ONLF led by Abdirahman Mohamed Sheikh Mahdi stated that the ONLF was a member of the coalition. On 26 September, the Jijiga-based faction, led by Abdikarin Sheikh Muse Qalbidhagax, stated that the ONLF was not a member of the coalition. The two factions disputed each other's legitimacy.

On 26 September, GPDM stated that it does not have an armed wing and that it is not a member of the coalition.

== Military actions ==
On 23 September 2026, the Ethiopian Peoples' Forces Coalition for Survival, a coalition of various Ethiopian rebel and insurgent groups, launched a large-scale military offensive against the Ethiopian National Defense Force (ENDF) in Tigray, Afar and Amhara. The Tigray People's Liberation Front (TPLF) described the offensive as a defensive war against the federal government of Ethiopia.

The TPLF took control of several towns bordering Tigray Region. Control shifted back to federal forces, with the ENDF retaking control of Afar towns and capturing the Tigray capital Mekelle. Eritrean troops entered Tigray while the ENDF continued advancing north in Tigray Region.

The offensive is the largest escalation in fighting since the Tigray war (2020–2022), which was one of the bloodiest conflicts of the 21st century.

== Relations with non-member groups ==
The Ethiopian government accused Sudan, which hosts the TPLF's "Army 70", and Eritrea and Egypt of supporting the coalition. Several other opposition groups have shown interest in joining or aiding the alliance, purportedly including the Sidama National Liberation Front and Agew Democratic Coalition.

== Criticism ==
Some critics argued that the Ethiopian government's heavy-handed response to armed opposition groups and political dissent was less a reflection of genuine security concerns and more a desperate attempt to justify its continued grip on power. By framing internal challenges as existential threats, the regime sought to absolve itself of accountability and mask its failures in governance. Some critics argued that the Ethiopian government's response to armed opposition groups and political dissent occurred alongside broader concerns over democratic backsliding.

This narrative of a conspiracy by enemies thereby provides a justification for increasingly authoritarian measures. Critics cited restrictions on political competition, insecurity during the 2026 Ethiopian general election, the exclusion of Tigray from voting, and increased reliance on security measures as factors contributing to concerns over political centralization and democratic governance. Some observers linked allegations surrounding groups such as Tsimdo to broader debates over the government's framing of armed opposition groups and foreign actors as security threats. Critics of the election process raised concerns over the absence of major opposition participation, insecurity in parts of the country, and limited electoral competition, which they argued affected the inclusiveness and legitimacy of the vote. Ethiopia's regional policies also drew criticism over tensions with Eritrea, Sudan and Somalia related to security, border disputes and access to the Red Sea.

Analysts predicted that renewed confrontation could undermine the regional diplomacy associated with Prime Minister Abiy Ahmed's early reform period following the 2018 Nobel Peace Prize and the Ethiopia–Eritrea peace agreement.

== See also ==
- Amhara nationalism
- Eritrean–Ethiopian War
- Ethiopian civil conflict (2018–present)
- Oromo nationalism
- Somali National Movement
- Simón Bolívar Guerrilla Coordinating Board
- Tigrayan nationalism
