= Ibrahim Osman Aliyu =

Ethiopian Afar political and military figure

Director of the Afar Regional Agriculture Bureau
- In office Before April 2025 – April 2025
- President: Awol Arba

Mayor of Berhale

Personal details
- Born: Berhale, Afar Region, Ethiopia
- Relatives: Aisha Mohammed (cousin)
- Nickname: Haji Ibrahim

Military service
- Allegiance: Afar Region (until 2025); Afar National Unity Revolutionary Front (2025–present)
- Branch/service: Afar Special Forces
- Rank: Commander
- Commands: Afar National Unity Revolutionary Front
- Battles/wars: Ethiopian civil conflict (2018–present); Tigray War; 2026 Ethiopian offensive

Ibrahim Osman Aliyu, also known as Haji Ibrahim, is an Ethiopian Afar politician and the leader of the armed group Afar National Unity Revolutionary Front (ANURF). He is from Berhale in the Afar Region where he previously served as Mayor of Berhale and as Director of the Afar Regional Agriculture Bureau.

Ibrahim became prominent as a military leader during the Tigray War, when he participated in the Afar response to the advance of the Tigray People's Liberation Front (TPLF) into the Afar Region. In April 2025, following disagreements with Ethiopian federal and Afar regional authorities, he left Ethiopia for Eritrea. He subsequently became the leader of ANURF, a participant in the 2026 Ethiopian offensive.

== Political career ==
Ibrahim is from Berhale, a town in Ethiopia's Afar Region. He served as mayor of Berhale before becoming an official in the Afar regional government.

He later served as Director of the Afar Regional Agriculture Bureau under regional president Awol Arba. The Africa Report similarly described him as a prominent Afar politician during his time as Director of the Afar Regional Agriculture Bureau.

== Military career ==
=== Tigray War ===
During the Tigray War, Ibrahim became involved in the defence of the Afar Region following the expansion of fighting from neighbouring Tigray into Afar in 2021. Africa Intelligence reported that, while serving as Mayor of Berhale, Ibrahim led part of the Afar response to the TPLF's invasion of the region.

The Pan African Review later reported that Ibrahim had been trained by Eritrea and credited him with leading forces that resisted TPLF attempts to reach the strategic Addis Ababa–Djibouti transport corridor during the war. The Africa Report described him as an influential military leader during the Tigray conflict and noted the role played by the Afar regional security forces in supporting the Ethiopian federal government against the TPLF.

=== Defection to Eritrea ===
In April 2025, Ibrahim left the Afar Region for neighbouring Eritrea following disagreements with Ethiopian federal and regional authorities. His departure occurred amid political disagreements concerning relations between the Afar and Issa communities and rapprochement between the Ethiopian and Djiboutian governments.

Africa Intelligence reported that Ibrahim travelled to Eritrea with by several dozen of his men. New Lines Magazine subsequently described him as a senior Afar commander who defected with a contingent of special forces.

By August 2025, an estimated 300 members of the Afar Special Forces and other supporters had joined Ibrahim, according to the Pan African Review.

=== Afar National Unity Revolutionary Front ===
Following his defection, Ibrahim became the leader of an Afar armed movement known as the Afar National Unity Revolutionary Front (ANURF).

In September 2026, ANURF became one of the organisations associated with the Ethiopian Peoples' Forces Coalition for Survival, an alliance of Ethiopian opposition groups.

=== 2026 Ethiopian offensive ===
During the 2026 Ethiopian offensive, ANURF fought alongside Tigrayan forces against Ethiopian federal forces in northern Afar. On 23 September 2026, Tigrayan forces allied with ANURF advanced into several districts of Zone 2 of the Afar Region.

During the fighting, Ibrahim stated that ANURF's campaign was directed against the ruling Prosperity Party, rather than the Afar population or other Afar armed groups. He called on Afar residents either to join his forces or remain away from the fighting.

== Political views ==
Ibrahim has criticised the Ethiopian federal government's policies toward the Afar Region. Following his defection from Ethiopia to Eritrea in 2025, he cited what he described as a failure to implement freedoms promised under Ethiopia's federal system and criticised the federal government's conduct toward northern Afar during and after the Tigray War.

He also opposed aspects of the Ethiopian government's rapprochement with Djibouti and its approach to territorial disputes involving Afar and Issa communities.

== Personal life ==
Ibrahim is from Berhale, a town in the Afar Region. Multiple sources have stated that he is the cousin of Ethiopian defence minister Aisha Mohammed Mussa.

== See also ==
- Afar National Unity Revolutionary Front
- Afar Revolutionary Democratic Unity Front
- Tigray War
- 2026 Ethiopian offensive
- Ethiopian civil conflict (2018–present)
