= A8 road (Ethiopia) =

Road in Ethiopia

A8 Road

Route information
- Maintained by Ethiopia National Highways Authority
- Length: 217 km (135 mi)

Major junctions
- North end: Shashamene
- South end: Bule Hora

Location
- Country: Ethiopia

Highway system
- Transport in Ethiopia

The A8 Road is a national route in Ethiopia spanning 217 kilometers from north to south. It connects the towns of Shashamene and Bule Hora, providing a link between the two regions.

== Route ==
The A8 road is situated on the eastern side of the Rift Valley, resulting in more pronounced elevation changes compared to the A7 on the western side. The A8 serves as a continuation of the A7 from the central region, offering a more direct route southward. While the A7 crosses the Rift Valley, the A8 provides a shorter path towards Kenya but terminates at the town of Bule Hora, approximately 300 kilometers from the Kenyan border, without reaching it.

== History ==
Following World War II, the A8 emerged as the main route connecting Ethiopia and Kenya. Initially designated as Route 6, it was renumbered as the A8 around 2013 with the introduction of a new road numbering system. Although the road to the Kenyan border at Moyale was fully paved in 2014, the A8 designation officially terminates at Bule Hora, and does not extend to the border.
