= Alliance for Freedom and Democracy =

Ethiopian parliamentary group formed in 2006

- Founded: 22 May 2006 in the Netherlands
- Ideology: Anti-authoritarianism; Factions: Oromo nationalism Somali nationalism Sidama self-determination Ethiopian nationalism Socialism; Ethnic federalism Liberalism
- National affiliation: OLF; ONLF; SNLF; Kinijit; EPPF

The Alliance for Freedom and Democracy (AFD) is an Ethiopian political alliance formed 22 May 2006 from the Oromo Liberation Front (OLF), the Ogaden National Liberation Front (ONLF), the Sidama National Liberation Front (SNLF), the Coalition for Unity and Democracy (CUD), and the Ethiopian People's Patriotic Front (EPPF, also known as Arbegnoch Gimbar or Patriot's Front).

== Creation ==
It was created when the leaders from the OLF called on all parties of what is currently the AFD and a few others that turned down the offer, to form an Alliance to coordinate their efforts in toppling the EPRDF government led by Prime Minister Meles Zenawi. Another opposition group, UEDF, was once part of it until it left the coalition.

== People's Alliance for Freedom and Democracy ==
An overlapping but distinct coalition held its first meeting from 21–25 March 2016 in Asmara, grouping together the OLF, the ONLF, the SNLF, the Gambela People's Liberation Movement, and the Benishangul People's Liberation Movement.
