= Somali State Resistance =

Rebel group located in the Somali Region of Ethiopia

- Muqaawamada Gobolka Soomaalida
- Flag commonly associated with the Somali State Resistance
- Leader: Mahamud Ugas Muhumed
- Dates active: November 2021 – December 2021
- Allegiance: UFEFCF
- Ideology: Somali nationalism Unification with Somalia; Civic democracy Anti-Abiy
- Status: Inactive
- Wars: Ethiopian civil conflict (2018–present): Tigray War

The Somali State Resistance (Somali: Muqaawamada Gobolka Soomaalida), Also known as MGS, was an opposition group representing the Somali Region of Ethiopia that joined the United Front of Ethiopian Federalist and Confederalist Forces in 2021 during the Tigray War. The Somali State Resistance emerged as an entity in 2021 under the leadership of Mahamud Ugas Muhumed, who aligned the group with the Tigray People's Liberation Front (TPLF) and eight other fronts during the Tigray War. The Somali State Resistance has stated their willingness to use both force and negotiation to attain their goals. The group issued a statement to the people of the Somali Region on 3 December 2021.

== History ==
In 2021, the group known as the Somali State Resistance, which has unknown origins, joined the United Front of Ethiopian Federalist and Confederalist Forces (UFEFCF) against the Ethiopian government during the Tigray War.

The Somali State Resistance did not exist prior to the signing ceremony in Washington, DC. The representative Mahamud Ugas served as Regional Minister of Planning and Economic Development of the Somali Region from 1991 until 1995. From 1995 until 2000, Ugas worked as a consultant and field researcher for various humanitarian organizations. According to his biography, Mahamud left Ethiopia in 2000 and sought political asylum in Canada. Neither Mohamud Ugas nor the Somali State Resistance has any official links to the Ogaden National Liberation Front (ONLF), however Mohamud Ugas reportedly attended the 2012 Nairobi peace talks between the Ethiopian government and the then ONLF insurgency as a representative from the Ogaden Human Rights Committee.

The group has been inactive since 19 December 2021, suggesting that it was likely a proxy organization built upon the political ambition to replace the ruling Prosperity Party party.
