= Kimant Democratic Party =

Political party in Ethiopia

The Kimant Democratic Party or KDP (also: Kemant, Qemant) is a political party of the Qemant people in Ethiopia.

== Affiliations ==
In December 2019, the Kimant Democratic Party associated with nine other Ethiopian political parties, including the Oromo Liberation Front, the Ogaden National Liberation Front and the Gambela People's Liberation Movement, stating they would work together against the Prosperity Party in preparation for the 2021 Ethiopian general election, which had been scheduled to take place in 2020.

Regional Amharan government officials claimed in April 2021 that the KDP was affiliated with the Tigray People's Liberation Front (TPLF) and the Oromo Liberation Army (OLA).

On 5 November 2021 during the Tigray War, the KDP and six other small groups declared the creation of a coalition with the TPLF and OLA called the United Front of Ethiopian Federalist and Confederalist Forces, whose declared aim was to "dismantle Abiy's government by force or by negotiations, and then form a transitional authority."

On 22 December 2022 over 300 members of the KDP surrendered to the regional government after the traditional and religious leaders facilitated a talk with officials in which they discussed the peaceful surrender of the group and the participation of its members in the integration training provided by the government.

== Leadership and structure ==
As of September 2019, the leader of KDP was Ato Abejew Workineh.

== Actions ==
In April 2021, Kimant Democratic Party supporters held a support rally for their party in a town in Gondar. The rally was criticised by regional government officials and the KDP was accused of being affiliated with the TPLF and OLA, after which verbal disagreements led to arrests and gunshots.
