= Mihretu Wodajo =

Ethiopian rebel leader of the Fano militia

- ምህረቱ ወዳጆ
- Born: Raya Kobo, Ethiopia
- Military career
- Allegiance: Fano
- Service years: 2018–present
- Nickname: Mire
- Commands: Wollo Fano
- Conflicts: Tigray War; Fano insurgency

Mihretu "Mire" Wodajo (Amharic: ምህረቱ ወዳጆ) is an Ethiopian rebel leader of Fano militia in the Wollo faction. Since 2023, he is currently allied to Fano as part of Fano insurgency.

== Life and career ==
Mihretu "Mire" Wodajo was born and raised in Raya Kobo. The nickname "Mire" was popular among the Fano groups during the Tigray War.

Mire possessed private guns as security force of the government forced him to disarm, leading his exile to Saudi Arabia. While there, he was unable to stay in Saudi Arabia over one year, which was later captured by national police and sent to Ethiopia. Again, he then emigrated to Saudi Arabia after persecuted by EPRDF government until 2018. In 2018, Mire, as wider reforms of Prime Minister Abiy Ahmed, returned to Ethiopia. At this time, Fano groups reemerged in Amhara Region and Mire forged its structure in his birthplace of Raya Kobo. He was responsible for the formation of Fano groups in Gondar, Gojjam and Shewa. During Tigrayan force incursion into Amhara Region, Mire organized Raya Fano groups and managed to acquire weapons during the course.

In addition, Mire formed East Amhara Fano as the war expanded into Kobo as well as he fought for North Shewa outside Wollo. After the 2022 Pretoria Agreement, Fano retreated in one area, but the government effort to disarm the regional force led East Amhara to fight the government force in which Mire attempted to rectify the incident. As the War in Amhara intensified, Mire fought the government force in Wollo faction.
