= 2026 Eritrean incursion into Ethiopia =

Part of the 2026 Ethiopian offensive

- Part of 2026 Ethiopian offensive
Date	29 September 2026 (Note: First reports of alleged incursions surfaced on 29 September 2026, while verified troop movements in Tigray were confirmed after 6 October 2026.) – ongoing
Location	Tigray Region, Afar Region (alleged), Ethiopia

Belligerents
Ethiopia	Eritrea

Commanders and leaders
(Ethiopia) Abiy Ahmed (Ethiopia) Birhanu Jula	(Eritrea) Isaias Afwerki (Eritrea) Filipos Woldeyohannes

Units involved
ENDF	EDF

Strength
unknown	6,000 (Ethiopian claim)

During the 2026 Ethiopian Offensive, sometime between 29 September and 6 October 2026 (inclusive), the Eritrean Army, which had remained present in Tigray Region in Ethiopia following the Tigray war, were reportedly deployed to several locations in Tigray before pulling back after drone strikes. Ethiopian authorities described the event as an invasion and Eritrean authorities described Ethiopia's threats to invade Eritrean ports and coastal areas as a declaration of war.

== Background ==
Eritrea and Ethiopia had a border conflict from 1998 to 2018, including the 1998–2000 Eritrean–Ethiopian War. Following the November 2020–November 2022 Tigray war, the EDF remained present in several border regions of Tigray Region, including Gulomahda and Irob as of September 2024. The Eritrean occupation of parts of Tigray was mapped by The Sentry in June 2025. EDF commanders carried out human trafficking, kidnapping and illegal gold mining during their occupation of Ethiopian territory.

In 2025, Ethiopian Prime Minister Abiy Ahmed and senior military officials issued repeated threats against Eritrea over control of the Red Sea coast. Abiy said Ethiopia's loss of coastline following Eritrea's independence was a "mistake" that would be "corrected," while Ethiopian ambassador Bacha Debele declared that Assab was "Ethiopia’s wealth" and would be returned "by force." Senior Ethiopian commanders described control of Assab as a "survival interest worth paying any price for" and said the army was working continually to secure it.

On 1 October 2026, during the 2026 Ethiopian offensive, Ethiopian authorities announced the closing of their embassy in Asmara and expelled 10 Eritrean diplomats and declaring them to be persona non grata, and saying that they posed a threat to national security. Eritrea replied by closing its embassy in Addis Ababa and by ending diplomatic ties with Ethiopia; both sides of the conflict accused each other of inflaming tensions.

== Events ==
=== Entry into Ethiopia ===
==== 29 September ====
Animation showcasing the various reported infiltrations and offensives by the EDF in the Republic of Ethiopia during the 2026 Ethiopian offensive

The governor of the Afar region, Awol Arba, accused the Eritrean Defence Forces (EDF) of infiltrating the region and stated that they were allegedly attempting to cut a road linking Djibouti and Ethiopia. Eritrea did not respond to the immediate accusations. The governor of Afar Region told Al Jazeera that 2/3 of the region is under Eritrean control. The Eritrean opposition group Brigade Nhamedu responded to the reports stating their condemnation in the alleged Eritrean direct involvement in the offensive. Despite these statements, independent mapping and conflict data from Armed Conflict Location and Event Data did not indicate the presence of a large Eritrean offensive, contrasting with the claims.

==== 1 October ====
The OSINT research group Hamer Intel reported the existence of an "Eritrean incursion" in Northern Afar region, without confirming its size.

==== 2 October ====
During a BBC interview, an unnamed pro-government militia commander fighting in Tigray stated that there were Eritrean troops fighting in the area alongside the rebels. The Eritrean Minister of Information Yemane Gebremeskel denied the presence of Eritrean troops in Tigray Region.

==== 4 October ====
The Ethiopian state-affiliated outlet Horn Review noted how the Eritrean army allegedly had broken into Ethiopian territory through the Assab-Bure front to the border Afar towns of Berhale and Dallol, allegedly reaching up to 20 km (12 mi) away from Adigrat.

==== 6 October ====
A Tigray Peace Force commander, Ermiyas Ababu, stated that the EDF entered Adigrat on 6 October. A local official in Adigrat said on 7 October that the EDF had already been in Adigrat "for days".

==== 7 October ====
Residents of Adigrat said that they had seen people in Eritrean military attire and with heavy weaponry in and around Adigrat and advancing towards Mekelle and Idaga Hamus. According to Agence France Presse and Associated Press, Eritrean Minister of Information Yemane Gebremeskel made a statement that neither denied nor confirmed the EDF presence in Tigray. EDF troops were hit by drone strikes during the invasion, according to a local resident in Idaga Hamus, and the State Minister of Lowlands Research and Development Sector of Ethiopia Abraham Belay said that Eritrea had used its "full capacity and logistics" in the invasion and that "[m]any Eritrean soldiers [were] killed or captured" and "the retaliation [would] be double."

TPF commander Ermiyas Ababu said the EDF entered Idaga Hamus.

==== 8 October ====
On 8 October, more reports were received about EDF troops having passed through Adigrat towards Idaga Hamus. Allegedly, the troops have entered the town of Wukro. EDF units were reported crossing over into Ethiopian territory through Zalambessa.

==== 9 October ====
Ethiopian foreign minister Gedion Timothewos accused Eritrean forces of advancing up to 60 km in Tigray. The ENDF used drone strikes in Adigrat during 7–8 October. Eritrean troops retreated north.

==== 10 October ====
By 10 October, reports say that the Ethiopia government forces and their allied militias have taken over Adigrat.

==== 11 October ====
An Ethiopian government source told UMD Media that on 11 October the ENDF occupied the Eritrean border village of Deba Sima in the Southern Denkalya subregion, 50 kilometres (31 mi) from Assab. Afar locals speaking to UMD Media disputed that the ENDF had done so.

==== 13 October ====
On 13 October, the ENDF took control of the border town of Zalambessa, with local residents claiming that the Eritreans had withdrawn to the north of the border.

== Reactions ==
In a private station interview, Ethiopian official Abraham Belay accused Eritrea of direct participation in the conflict, and that the retaliation would be double.

Ethiopia's foreign minister Gedion Timothewos sent a letter to the United Nations Security Council on 8 October, which stated that "Ethiopia is left with no other option but to defend itself". Eritrea's information minister Yemane Gebremeskel responded by saying that Eritrea was facing an "unprovoked war of aggression by its neighbour". On 10 October, Eritrea asked the UN Security Council take actions on Ethiopia.

Somalia, despite signing the El Alamein Declaration, declared itself to be neutral in the conflict. Professor Liban Igal, an analyst specializing in Horn of Africa affairs, however, stated that this official statement by the Somali administration was incoherent with Somalia's actions, which according to him leaned towards the alliance finalized the same month.

== See also ==
- 1998 Eritrean invasion of Ethiopia
