= Fano (militia) =

Amhara insurgent organization in Ethiopia

- ፋኖ
- Blank tricolor of the Ethiopian flag used by Fano
- Leaders: Zemene Kassie; Mihretu Wodajo; Baye Kengaw; Meketaw Mamo
- Dates active: 2018–present
- Group: Amhara Fano National Movement
- Active regions: Ethiopia: Amhara Region
- Ideology: Amhara nationalism
- Size: 15,000–20,000 (2024)
- Wars: Ethiopian civil conflict (2018–present); Tigray War; OLA insurgency; Fano insurgency; Amhara offensive; Operation Adem Ali; 2026 Ethiopian offensive

Fano (Amharic: ፋኖ) is an ethno-nationalist Amhara insurgent group and former protest movement in Ethiopia. It has engaged in violent clashes and several conflicts throughout Ethiopia, since 2018, in the name of neutralizing perceived threats to the Amhara people. Fano has absorbed many units and personnel of the former gendarmerie regional forces in the Amhara Region (Amhara Regional Special Forces) that revolted to integrate into the Ethiopian National Defense Force (ENDF) in 2023. Fano insurgents have been involved in armed conflicts with the Tigray People's Liberation Front (TPLF), the Oromo Liberation Army (OLA) and the ENDF. They have also clashed with the Sudanese Armed Forces (SAF) on the border of Ethiopia and Sudan.

During the Tigray War, Fano supported the Ethiopian government forces against rebels aligned to the Tigray People's Liberation Front (TPLF). Since the outbreak of the Fano insurgency during April 2023, Fano has been fighting the Ethiopian government. The movement consisted of several insurgent factions that operate independently, without a unified command. These factions were organized locally, each with its own leader in different parts of the Amhara region. However, since 2025, the majority of Fano factions have coalesced into the Amhara Fano National Movement, chaired by Zemene Kassie.

== Etymology ==
Historically, the term Fano referred to irregular soldiers who voluntarily participated in military campaigns. The term carries a strong nationalistic connotation, harking back to fighters who defended Ethiopia during the Second Italo-Ethiopian War in the 1930s, often overlapping with the Arbegnoch. Afterwards, the term would gain even more cultural significance as the name of a song by popular Azmari Kassa Tessema, and the 1960s protest song "Fano tesemara" ('O Guerrilla, rise to arms'). Although activists popularized the term once again, for peasants, Fano has consistently retained its original meaning: a free peasant fighting to defend their homeland, Ethiopia.

== History ==
=== Origins (2016–2020) ===
Amhara youth revived the term during the large-scale protests in 2016 by Oromo and Amhara demonstrators aimed against the Tigray People's Liberation Front (TPLF)-dominated federal government. While demonstrations in the Amhara region by Fano protestors were smaller and less widespread than those in Oromia region, they were far more violent. Despite the shared Amhara and Oromo resentment of the TPLF, little bound the two ethnic groups together in the long term after the TPLF was replaced by the Oromo dominated government of Prime Minister Abiy Ahmed in 2018.

Fano emerged from the collaboration of various different Amhara groups. The initial group was a protest movement that consisted of political activists led by Demeke Zewdu advocating for the integration of Welkait, Kafta Humera, and Tsegede (officially located in the Tigray Region) into the Amhara Region since mid-2016. Many faced imprisonment under the TPLF-led government before being released in 2018, returning to politics and establishing connections with local militias. Another group consists of local militias, or armed civilians, often recruited from former soldiers of the Ethiopian National Defense Force (ENDF), these militias were organized locally and carried out actions for the defense of what they considered their ethnic group's interests. The last important group are the Amhara Regional Special Forces, a paramilitary and gendarmerie force under the command of the government of the Amhara Region. Since 2018, the growth of these militias and special forces has been substantial, driven by the influence of General Asaminew Tsige. Asaminew, initially a pan-Ethiopian figure turned Amhara ethno-nationalist, had spent nearly a decade in prison before his release in 2018 under Abiy Ahmed's political reforms. Shortly after, he assumed leadership of the regional security apparatus and spearheaded the recruitment of thousands of fighters and integrated fellow Amhara ethno-nationalists into the security apparatus. Together these groups were collectively known as Fano. Being forged in Amhara nationalism and the prophetic tradition of the Ethiopian Orthodox Church, Fano groups often wear symbolic crosses associated with the envisioned revival of a new Ethiopian kingdom.

During the days leading to 10 January 2019, local militias and regional forces started building trenches and preparing to attack Qemant people in Metemma. From 15:00 on 10 January 2019 to 13:00 on 11 January 58 Qemant people were killed in the massacre in Metemma using guns, grenades, stones and by burning houses. Amnesty stated that a unit of the Amhara police special force wore insignia identifying members as Fano. The Ethiopian National Defense Force (ENDF) in Metemma initially refused to intervene on the grounds that they didn't have orders to do so. The massacre ended when the ENDF intervened on the afternoon of 11 January. On 29 September 2019, Fano killed and burnt four members of a family in Azezo in revenge for the killing of an Amhara youth. A cycle of vengeance attacks continued for several days. Fano went "home to home attacking Qemant residents".

One stated objective of a Fano leader in March 2020 was for Benishangul-Gumuz Region's Metekel Zone, the northern districts of Welkait and Raya in Tigray, as well as the southern district of Dera to be placed under the control of the Amhara Region. On 19 March 2020, clashes including gunfire took place between youths and federal security forces in Gondar and Dabat in the Amhara Region. The youths were Fano according to Andafta Media. Prosperity Party authorities in Amhara said that the youths were not related to Fano but pursuing their own interests in the name of Fano. On 23 April 2020, local state media reported that Fano leader Mesafint Tesfu had reached an agreement with government authorities after the government worried that the residence might spread to the areas of the Amhara region.

=== Rise (2020–2022) ===
Fano militias and the Amhara regional forces backed the ENDF during the Tigray War, which began on 4 November 2020 when TPLF-aligned forces attacked the ENDF Northern Command headquarters in what TPLF spokesman Getachew Reda called a "preemptive operation". Fano played a significant role in the conquest of Western Tigray in November 2020. After the TPLF was evicted, many fighters stayed to garrison the newly occupied zone. Since most former police officers from Western Tigray had defected to join the Tigray Defence Forces (TDF) or fled to Sudan, Fano militiamen and Amhara regional forces remained in the zone. They supported the ENDF at checkpoints, ensuring safety for new administrators.

By mid-December, they had established a provisional "Setit-Humera zone," covering the former Welkait, Kafta Humera, and Tsegede wereda. In public gatherings, recently appointed local administrators emphasized their firm stance against any changes to this forcefully delineated boundary. They contended that the Tekezé River had historically served as the natural divide between Tigray and "Amhara lands." Activists expressed frustration when federal authorities, including Abiy Ahmed, consistently labeled it as "Western Tigray." Nevertheless, it became apparent that the federal government was not in a position to restrain their new Amhara allies.

Amhara regional forces and militias soon carried out a coordinated campaign of ethnic cleansing against Tigrayans in Western Tigray. In several towns across Western Tigray, signs were displayed ordering Tigrayans to leave, and local administrators discussed plans to remove Tigrayans in open meetings. Tigrayans were given 24-hour ultimatums to leave or be killed. Humera, Addi Remets and Dansha were virtually depopulated, with numerous shops closed, some of them subjected to looting. Any traces of a Tigrinya-speaking administration were deliberately erased. Tigrinya-written signs, including those on private hotels and shops, were repainted. Many houses were destroyed during the fighting, however, others were deliberately set on fire after the conflict ceased. Many Tigrayan communities, facing intimidation, fled east, towards central Tigray. Officials from the provisional administration then actively encouraged people from Gondar areas to settle in, offering free houses to those with connections to the new administration.

After Operation Alula, the TDF soon advanced into the Amhara Region, seizing various cities and towns. Fano subsequently mobilized with thousands of young men joining the militia, bolstering its ranks. Fano has attained popularity among Amhara people for their mobilization against the TPLF invasion of the Amhara Region. Orthodox clergy have frequently supported Fano, with monasteries serving as meeting locations, and during the Tigray War, Amhara Orthodox priests attended battlefields to provide prayers and blessings.

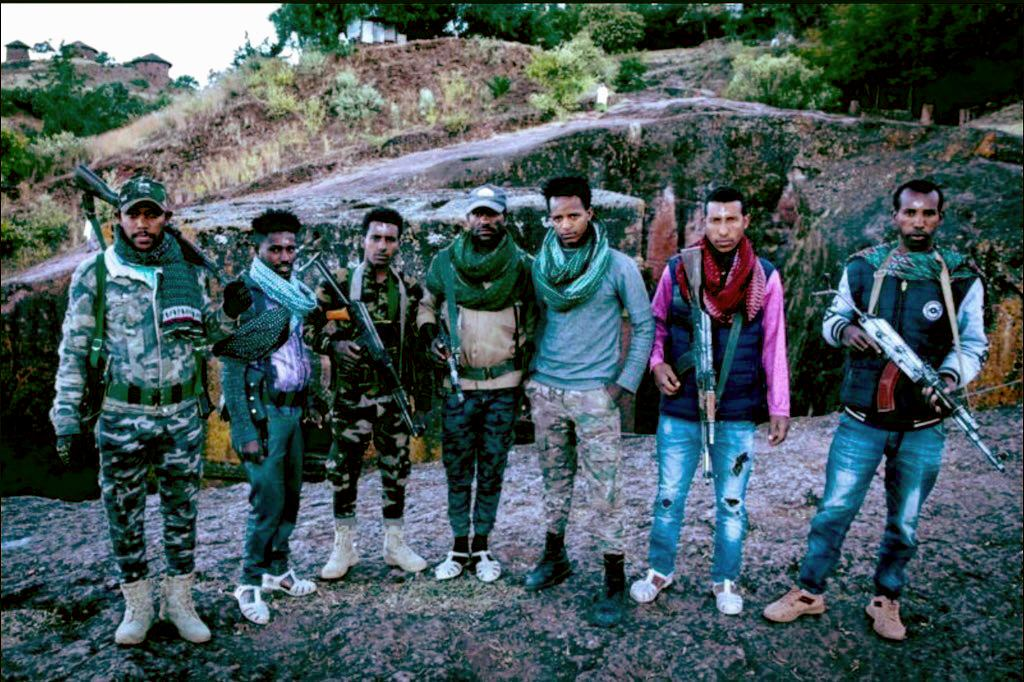
Fano fighters in Lalibela after re-capturing the town from the TDF.

On 19 May 2022, clashes broke out between federal government forces and Fano in the town of Mota when government forces attempted to disarm and arrest Fano members. Later that day, as locals gathered in protest against the arrests, federal and regional forces fired into the crowd, killing an unspecified number of individuals. On 23 May 2022, local state media reported that over 4,500 people were arrested in the Amhara Region. Amhara regional authorities aligned with the Prosperity Party said that they were not targeting Fano but individuals who had committed illegal acts in the name of Fano.

=== Rebellion (2023–present) ===
In April 2023, tensions between the Ethiopian government and Fano escalated following a plan to integrate the Amhara Regional Special Forces into the national army. Federal troops clashed with Fano militias and units defecting from the Amhara regional forces. Initially, they organized protests and set up roadblocks, with some militants resorting to violent actions. On 27 April, armed dissidents assassinated Girma Yeshitila, the head of the Prosperity Party in the Amhara Region.

On 1 August 2023, full-scale war erupted between Fano and the ENDF in the context of the Fano insurgency, fighting occurred in Gondar, Debre Tabor and Debre Markos in the first day. On 2 August, Fano seized Lalibela. On state television EBC, ENDF spokesperson Colonel Getnet warned that the military would take measure if Fano continued "disturbing the country’s peace". As a response to the escalation of security issues in Amhara Region, the government declared state of emergency on 4 August, imposing ban to public gathering and make arrests without warrants as well as imposing curfew.

During the summer of 2024, an attempt to integrate Fano forces under a single leadership was made and Eskinder Nega was named head of the organization. However, Nega's leadership was rejected by several groups within the organization, and as of August 2024 no unified leadership had been established for the group. The six major groups operating under the umbrella of Fano are:

- Amhara People's Army (led by Eskinder Nega)
- Amhara Fano in Wollo (led by Mihretu Wodajo)
- Amhara Fano Gojjam (led by Zemene Kassie)
- Amhara Fano of Gondar (led by Habte Wolde)
- Amhara Fano in Gondar (led by Baye Kengaw)
- Shewa Governorate (led by Meketaw Mamo)

Prime Minister Abiy Ahmed has stated that it is difficult for his government to negotiate with Fano due to the disjointed nature of the organization.

Many Fano recruits are in their early twenties, with motivations for joining the insurgency ranging from hatred of the federal government to lack of viable alternatives due to the decline of the local economy as a result of the war.

On 9 May, 2025, 4 Fano factions -Gojjam Fano, Wollo Fano, (Gondar) Amhara Fano Unity, and Shewa Fano- announced that they were unifying to establish the Amhara Fano National Force (AFNF) under a 13 member Central Command. According to the AFNF, the purpose of this unfication was to establish a cohesive body to protect the Amhara people.

On 22 January, 2026, the 2 largest Fano factions —Amhara Fano National Force (AFNF) and Amhara Fano Peace Organization (AFPO)— unified into the Amhara Fano National Movement (AFNM), the first Fano joint command.

On 11 February 2026, Fano entered the city of Debre Tabor where they burned down the police station and other government institutions before withdrawing the next day due to drone strikes.

Territorial control as of November 2025. (Note: Other maps of territorial control in this war are presented by MapEthiopia) (For a more detailed, up-to-date, interactive map, see here). Pro-federal government troops Ethiopian federal government and regional allies Anti-federal government rebels Controlled by the Tigray People's Liberation Front Oromo Liberation Army Fano

== Factions ==
=== Wollo Fano ===
The Fano faction in Wollo is led by Mihretu "Mire" Wodajo and commanded by Command division of Fano under Colonel Fantahun Muhabe. In April 2024, the division said to be reached an agreement the federal government under single command. Like other divisions, the Wollo faction is actively operating in the Amhara Region and engaging in fighting against Ethiopian government forces. In July 2024, the Ethiopian security forces captured the division's logistic supplier in South Wollo Zone.

=== Gojjam Fano ===
The Gojjam Fano is co-headed by Asres Mare and Zemene Kassie. In August 2024, the Gojjam Fano declared they were undertaking a special operation after the ENDF deployed 30,000 troops in the region. As part of their strategy, the Fano prohibited any vehicular movement except for ambulances. The Gojjam Fano was rumored to have reached an agreement with the government. Meanwhile, the head of the foreign and diaspora affairs department for the division Simeneh Mulatu dismissed this rumor, stating that there have not been any talks or negotiations with the government. On 26 March 2024, the ENDF Brigadier General Gaddissa Diro was killed in the Dega Damo area of Gojjam.

=== Gondar Fano ===
The Gondar Fano is headed by Baye Kengaw, and Mesafint Tesfu is the leader of the Amhara Fano Unity in Gondar (AFUiG). The group played a crucial role in operations during the August 2023 fight against the ENDF troops, capturing the Gondar city until being pushed back by the government troops on 8 August. On 20 March 2024 Major Wubante Abate, a prominent Fano leader and founder of Guna Brigade of Fano forces in South Gondar, was reportedly killed in action. He was killed in Dera district, Gelawdowos area after a long battle with the government forces. On 4 April 2024, the Fano units in South Gondar claimed to have killed 52 ENDF soldiers, while 36 were reportedly wounded. The operation, codenamed "Zemecha Operation Wubante", was executed in response to Wubante's death in the same region.

Habte Wolde (Amharic: ሀብቴ ወልዴ) leads the North Gondar Command. Since 2023 he has partaken in the Fano insurgency, fighting against the government forces. Wolde was born and raised in Gondar. Although he had no involvement in any political groups or armed struggle movements during the early reforms of Abiy Ahmed, he did participate in Fano youth movements in Amhara region to end the persecution of Amhara people. After 2019–2020 Habte joined the Fano movement, asserting the persecution of Amhara would end by armed response. When the Tigray war broke out, he fought alongside Fano militants in various fronts, supporting the Ethiopian National Defense Force (ENDF) force. As Habte's group was successful in collecting weapons and professional combating, the government targeted Habte and the Fano insurgency broke out. Since 2023 Habte has led the North Gondar Command and, as of 2024, his battalion is said to have increased significantly.

=== Shewa Fano ===
The Shewa Fano is led by Dessalegn SiyasbShewa under the name Shewa Province Asamnew Command. On 3 April 2026, Fano forces captured Shewa Robit town. Mamo Bridge confirmed to Anchor Media that the town is under control and fighting is take place. After the government withdrew from the mountainous region, it was alleged that the government troops targeted artillery shelling in the town. In July 2025, the division reportedly engaged fighting with joint ENDF–militia force in a location about 55 kilometers to the capital Addis Ababa. According to an Ethiopian Media Services (EMS) report, the government force deployed shelling at Koremash town, in Hageremariam Kessem woreda, with heavy artillery indiscriminately. Deputy Public Relation Head of the former Amhara Fano Shewa Nigatu Yitaferu, the Fano forces have withdrew from the town to avoid civilian causality, while ambushing into the rural areas. On 22 July, The former Shewa's Fano leader Assegid Mekonnen has been surrendered by the Ethiopian security forces.

=== Amhara People's Army ===
The Amhara People's Army was founded by Eskinder Nega in Gojjam on 20 May 2023. It was initially named as the Amhara People's Front (APF). It was rumored that Eskinder was allied to other Fano groups and he was hidden.

=== Amhara Fano National Movement ===
The Amhara Fano National Movement (AFNM) was founded on 17 January 2026 by merging Amhara Fano National Force and Amhara Fano People's Organization. It is unified military and political organization headed by Arbegna Zemene Kassie and Meketaw Mamo.

== See also ==
- Tigray War
- Qeerroo
- Zemene Kassie
