= El Alamein Declaration =

2026 joint declaration

El Alamein Joint Declaration
- The nations which signed the El Alemein Joint Declaration are highlighted in blue.
- Type: Strategic partnership, joint declaration
- Context: Diplomatic fallout caused by the context surrounding the 2026 Ethiopian offensive
- Drafted: 4 October 2026
- Signed: 4 October 2026
- Location: New Alamein, Matrouh Governorate, Egypt
- Signatories: Abdel Fattah El-Sisi; Isaias Afwerki; Hassan Sheikh Mohamud; Abdel Fattah al-Burhan
- Parties: Egypt; Eritrea; Somalia; Sudan

The El Alamein Joint Declaration is a declaration from 4 October 2026 by the governments of Egypt, Eritrea, Somalia, and Sudan following a quadrilateral consultative summit in New Alamein, Egypt. The summit was hosted by Egyptian president Abdel Fattah el-Sisi and attended by Eritrean president Isaias Afwerki, Somali President Hassan Sheikh Mohamud, and Sudanese Transitional Sovereignty Council chairman Abdel Fattah al-Burhan. The declaration addresses regional security and cooperation in the Horn of Africa and Red Sea, as well as the Sudanese civil war, the territorial integrity of Somalia (under the principle of "One Somalia"), Red Sea governance, and the dispute over the use of Nile waters.

== Background ==
The summit took place amid the renewed conflict in Ethiopia which started in September 2026. In the days preceding the meeting, relations between Ethiopia and Eritrea had deteriorated sharply, while Ethiopia had accused Egypt, Eritrea, and Sudan of supporting the Ethiopian Peoples' Forces Coalition for Survival, whilst also accusing specifically Eritrea of having initiated an invasion of its northern territories of Afar and Tigray; the three countries denied the accusations. Furthermore, renewed disputes over the Grand Ethiopian Renaissance Dam on the Nile and Ethiopia's ambition of a Red Sea port prompted the meeting.

== History ==
=== Creation ===
The summit was convened by el-Sisi and held in New Alamein City on 4 October 2026. According to the Egyptian presidency, the leaders discussed developments in the Horn of Africa and Red Sea region, as well as political, economic, possible military and trade cooperation among the four countries. The meeting produced the El Alamein Joint Declaration, which stated that regional stability should be based on international law, respect for sovereignty and territorial integrity and non-interference in the internal affairs of the states.

The four leaders agreed to establish a mechanism to follow up on the summit's decisions. It called on regional and international partners to also provide adequate, sustainable and predictable funding for the African Union Support and Stabilization Mission in Somalia (AUSSOM) and a One Somalia doctrine against the existence of an independent Somaliland; Furthermore, the declaration aimed at preserving the integrity of Sudan's territories amid its civil war and the natural flow of the Nile river. The Eritreans pushed for "deterrence" against any hypothetical offensive in Assab by Ethiopia.

== Analysis ==
Sunatimes News Agency stated that, upon its creation, the alliance could be best described as a "coordinated diplomatic front" rather than a "four-state military alliance", the latter definition described as "premature".

== Reactions ==
Ethiopia warned against what it perceived as "threats" over the Nile and Red Sea question, stating that the declaration was ignoring the "geographic and historical realities" of Ethiopia, reaffirming that the country's closest point to the coast was of 30 miles, further threatening not to interfere with national integrity and Ethiopia's national interests and ambitions.

The Somaliland Authors And Writers Association stated its disdain at the coalition's joint refusal of Somaliland's recognition and its opposition to the declaration's ideal.
