= Baye Kengaw =

Ethiopian rebel leader of Fano militia

- ባዬ ቀናው
- Born: Wegera, North Gondar Zone, Ethiopia
- Military career
- Allegiance: Fano
- Service years: 2020–present
- Commands: South Gondar Command
- Conflicts: Tigray War; Fano insurgency

Baye Kengaw (Amharic: ባዬ ቀናው) is an Ethiopian rebel leader of Fano militia who leads the South Gondar Command. Since 2023, he is partaking in the Fano insurgency fighting against the government force.

== Life and career ==
Baye Kengaw was born in Wegera woreda of North Gondar Zone. He fled to desert in 2001 because of the EPRDF government arrested his family members for their political views. There, he could stayed for four years.

In 2005, the government arrested him for two years and was released in 2006. However, shortly after his release, Baye opted to fight the government for in his desert. After years of Coloniel Demeke Zewdu encirclement by the Federal Police in Gondar in unrest, Baye engaged in resistance along his fighters. In 2020, Baye was returned to the desert. During the onset of the Tigray War in November 2020, Baye fought the Tigrayan forces – who made incursion toward the Amhara region – supporting the Ethiopian National Defense Force (ENDF).

After the war settled by Pretoria Agreement and transitioning to the Fano insurgency, Baye engaged fight with the government force in Gondar in August 2023, aligning with the Fano militants. He led the Fano in Gondar operating in the South Gondar, Central Gondar and North Gondar areas.
