= A7 road (Ethiopia) =

Road in Ethiopia

A7 Road

Route information
- Maintained by Ethiopia National Highways Authority
- Length: 425 km (264 mi)

Major junctions
- North end: Modjo
- South end: Arba Minch

Location
- Country: Ethiopia

Highway system
- Transport in Ethiopia

The A7 Road is a national route in Ethiopia that runs north–south, connecting Modjo and Arba Minch. It has a total length of 425 kilometers.

== Route ==
The A7 road originates in Modjo, where it connects to the A1, and extends southward to Arba Minch. Modjo is situated approximately 60 kilometers southeast of Addis Ababa, the capital city. The A7 traverses the Rift Valley, a vast region with an elevation of around 1,700 meters, featuring several large lakes. As the road proceeds from Shashamane to Sodo, it shifts from the eastern to the western side of the valley before continuing onward to Arba Minch. Arba Minch is located over 200 kilometers from the Kenyan border.

== History ==
The A7 road in Ethiopia underwent significant development following World War II. Initially, a main road connected Addis Ababa to Sodo, but it took a western route, serving as an alternative path to Mogadishu and crossing the Rift Valley. The road's extension to the Kenyan border occurred relatively late. Today, the A7 is a link between Ethiopia and Kenya, forming part of the Trans-Africa Highway 4 from Cairo to Cape Town. Historically, the northern section of the A7 was designated as Route 6, connecting Modjo to the Kenyan border, while Route 9 ran parallel to it further west. In 2013, the current trunk road numbering system was introduced, and the A7 absorbed parts of both routes.

Asphaltation of the A7 occurred in phases: the Shashemene to Alaba Kulito section was completed by 2003–2004, and the north–south section up to Soddo was finished around 2009. In 2021, the northern section of the A7 was bypassed with the opening of the initial segment of the Mojo-Hawassa Expressway.
