= Anchekorer =

Town in Amhara Region, Ethiopia

Anchekorer አንጭቆረር
- Town
- Interactive map of Anchekorer
- Coordinates: 9°48′6″N 39°17′19″E
- Country: Ethiopia
- Regional State: Amara
- Zone: North Shewa

Anchekorer (Amharic: አንጭቆረር, alternatively transliterated as Anchikorer) is a rural town and locality in the North Shewa Zone of the Amhara Region.

== History ==
According to the record "Local History of Ethiopia" the town used to be the centre of Wayu sub-district, part of Moret wereda back in 1964.

On 9 October 2026, during the 2026 Ethiopian offensive, Fano rebels captured the town.
