= United Front of Ethiopian Federalist and Confederalist Forces =

Ethiopian rebel coalition formed in 2021

- Dates active: 5 November 2021 – 1 November 2022
- Groups: OLA; Gambella Peoples Liberation Army; Agaw Democratic Movement; SNLF; Somali State Resistance; Former members: ARDUF (Nov 2021 – Jan 2022); BPLM (Nov 2021 – Oct 2022); TPLF (Nov 2021 – Nov 2022); Kimant Democratic Party (Nov 2021 – Dec 2022)
- Active regions: Ethiopia
- Ideology: Anti-Abiy; Ethnic federalism
- Status: Inactive

The United Front of Ethiopian Federalist and Confederalist Forces (UFEFCF) was a coalition of six Ethiopian rebel groups, including the Tigray People's Liberation Front (TPLF) before 2022 and the Oromo Liberation Army (OLA), created in November 2021 during the Tigray War.

== Creation ==
=== TDF–OLA alliance ===
In August 2021, Tigray People's Liberation Front (TPLF) leader Debretsion Gebremichael and spokesperson Getachew Reda stated that the Tigray Defense Forces was in negotiations with the Oromo Liberation Army (OLA) to cooperate in fighting against the Ethiopian National Defense Forces (ENDF). OLA spokesperson Odaa Tarbii stated that the two groups "share[d] intel and coordinate[d] strategy"; however, he stated that they share no common ideological goals with the TPLF and thus the collaboration was only temporary.

=== Nine-group alliance ===
By late October 2021, negotiations had extended to several smaller rebel groups, of which many are widely known to be satellite organizations created and funded by the TPLF to create the impression that there exists shared grievance and thus widespread support among other ethnic groups for their insurgency. On 5 November 2021, the alliance was announced to be composed of the following nine groups almost all of which appeared overnight following the beginning of the TPLF insurgency:

- Afar Revolutionary Democratic Unity Front
- Agaw Democratic Movement
- Benishangul People's Liberation Movement
- Gambella Peoples Liberation Army
- Global Kimant People Right and Justice Movement/Kimant Democratic Party
- Oromo Liberation Army
- Sidama National Liberation Front
- Somali State Resistance
- Tigray People's Liberation Front

The alliance was named the United Front of Ethiopian Federalist and Confederalist Forces.

On 31 January 2022 the ARDUF announced that it was distancing itself from the United Front of Ethiopian Federalist and Confederalist Forces after accusing Tigrayan forces of killing civilians in the Afar region.

On 19 October 2022, the BPLM signed a peace agreement with the regional government and left the coalition.

During the Ethiopia–Tigray peace agreement, the TPLF agreed to "Refrain from aiding and abetting, supporting, or collaborating with any armed or subversive group in any part of the country."

On 22 December 2022, over 300 members of the Kimant Democratic Party were arrested by Amhara regional authorities after their leaders facilitated a talk with the government in which they discussed the peaceful surrender of the group and the participation of its members in the integration training provided by the government.

== Aims ==
The alliance stated that its aim was to "dismantle Abiy's government by force or by negotiations, and then form a transitional authority."

== Reactions ==
Gedion Timotheos, the Ethiopian Minister of Justice, called the announcement of the nine-group alliance on 5 November 2021 a "publicity stunt" and claimed that some of the participating groups were "not really organisations that have any traction".
