= Shire Airport =

Airport in Ethiopia

Shire Airport Indaselassie Airport
- IATA: SHC; ICAO: HASR

Summary
- Airport type: Public
- Owner: Ethiopian Civil Aviation Authority
- Operator: Ethiopian Airports Enterprise
- Serves: Shire, Ethiopia
- Elevation AMSL: 6,207 ft (1,892 m)
- Coordinates: 14°04′46″N 38°16′15″E

Map
- Location of airport in Ethiopia

Runways
Direction	Length		Surface
Direction	m	ft	Surface
15/33	2,480	8,136	Asphalt
- Source: SkyVector: GCM Google Maps

Shire Airport, also known as Shire Inda Selassie Airport or Indaselassie Airport, (IATA: SHC) is a public airport serving Shire, a city in the Tigray National Regional State, in northern Ethiopia. The airport lies at an elevation of 6,207 feet (1,892 m) above mean sea level. It is located just south of the city.

Shire Airport was constructed by Ethiopian Construction Works Corporation, Transport Infrastructure Construction Sector. The project was signed to construct in 2015 and completed in 2017. The project included airport runway, apron, and taxiway, as well as a road running from Shire city to the airport.

== Airlines and destinations ==
Airlines	Destinations
Ethiopian Airlines	Addis Ababa, Mek'ele, Semera

== See also ==
- Transport in Ethiopia
- List of airports in Ethiopia
