= Fano tesemara =

Protest song in Ethiopia used in late 1960s

Fano tesemara (Amharic: ፋኖ ተሰማራ, 'O Guerrilla, rise to arms') is an Ethiopian song. It was one of the most popular protest songs of the Ethiopian Student Movement (ESM) during the late 1960s. The song was inspired by the Cuban and Vietnamese revolutions, as manifested in its opening lines:

ፋኖ ተሰማራ፤
ፋኖ ተሰማራ፤
እንደ ሆ ቺ ሚኒ፤
እንደ ቼ ጉቬራ

O Guerrilla, rise to arms!
O Guerrilla, rise to arms!
Follow the example of Ho Chi Minh!
Follow the example of Che Guevara!
