= Zemene Kassie =

Ethiopian rebel leader of the Fano militia (born 1985)

- ዘመነ ካሴ

Chairman of the Amhara Fano National Movement
- Incumbent
- Assumed office 17 January 2026
- Deputy: Meketaw Mamo
- Preceded by: Position established

Chairman of the West Amhara (Tewodros) command of the Amhara Fano National Force (AFNF)
- In office 9 May 2025 – 17 January 2026

Leader of Amhara Fano, Gojjam Command
- In office 9 April 2023 – 9 May 2025

Chairman of Amhara Youth Association
- In office 10 September 2018 – 1 January 2023

Spokesperson of Patriotic Ginbot 7
- In office 10 September 2013 – 1 January 2017

President of Amhara Region Youth League
- In office 1 September 2011 – 1 September 2013

Personal details
- Born: 14 March 1985 (age 41) Merawi, Gojjam Province, Ethiopia
- Party: Ginbot 7 (2013–2016)
- Education: Haramaya University (BA); Ethiopian Civil Service University (MSc)
- Military career
- Allegiance: Fano
- Service years: 2018–2026
- Commands: Gojjam Fano Command
- Conflicts: Tigray War; War in Amhara

Zemene Kassie (Note: Amharic: ዘመነ ካሴ) (born 14 March 1985) is an Ethiopian politician who is the chairman of the Amhara Fano National Movement (AFNM) since 2026. He was the former leader of the Amhara Fano militia, Gojjam command. He is widely regarded as one of the prominent figures of the new Amhara nationalism.

Born in Merawi, near Bahir Dar, Ethiopia, Zemene previously worked in various government positions in the early-2010s. Following disagreements with EPRDF's regional leaders in Amhara, he was forced into exile to Eritrea and joined the Ginbot 7 opposition group in order to counter EPRDF government persecution. He then returned to Ethiopia in 2018 after premiership of Prime Minister Abiy Ahmed, and worked in organizing Amhara youth for political actions in Ethiopia.

Zemene organized a Fano faction under the banner of Amhara Popular Force during the Tigray War when Tigrayan rebel forces invaded the Amhara region in mid-2021. It was during the Tigray War that he rose to prominence as a leading figure in the Fano militia.

== Early life and education ==
Zemene was born on 14 March 1985 and raised in Merawi, near Bahir Dar in the North Gojjam Zone of Ethiopia. In addition to his academic achievements, Zemene was also recognized for his literary talents, particularly as a poet for Merewa Band, a prominent music and art club in the Amhara region. He earned his Bachelor's degree from Haramaya University, graduating as the valedictorian and gold medalist of the class of 2007. In 2011, he completed his MSc in Urban Planning and Development at the Ethiopian Civil Service University.

== Political career ==
Right after completing his studies at Haramaya, he joined the then-ruling party, EPRDF, and held various government positions both as a professional and a leader. His sensational oratory skills and academic achievements quickly set him apart, which led the party to name him as President of Amhara Region Youth League. Citing the injustices faced by the Amhara people under the authoritarian rule of the EPRDF government, Zemene moved to Eritrea in 2013 to join the Ginbot 7 party. There, he became one of the main coordinators of the armed struggle against the EPRDF regime, alongside Andargachew Tsege and Berhanu Nega.

After Prime Minister Abiy Ahmed came to power in 2018, Zemene returned to Ethiopia and was offered a cabinet position by the Amhara Region administration. He declined the offer, stating that he would not be able to make a meaningful impact from within the government. Instead, he focused on mobilizing Amhara youth through popular, fiery and often critical speeches that emphasized Amhara nationalism. As chairman of the Amhara Youth Association, he worked to unite the youth under a single organization, a move that was met with resistance from Abiy Ahmed and Oromo factions within the ruling Prosperity Party. Despite this opposition, Zemene continued to serve as an informal advisor to the Amhara Region Peace and Security Bureau under Brigadier General Asaminew Tsige, focusing on regional youth and security matters. In addition to Abiy Ahmed's alleged conspiracy and willful negligence in stopping Amhara massacre in Oromia, Asaminew Tsige's resistance to arresting Zemene and other Amhara nationalist allies became one of the key points of contention between Asaminew and Abiy Ahmed, which ultimately culminated in the Amhara Region alleged "coup attempt" and the assassination of Amhara president Ambachew Mekonnen, Brigadier General Asaminew Tsige, General Seare Mekonnen, and other prominent political and military leaders on June 22, 2019. Zemene went into hiding following the Amhara region alleged "coup" attempt.

== Rebel career ==
Zemene gained recognition as a military commander after the start of Tigray War in 2020, as a leading figure of the Fano militia. During the incursion of Tigrayan forces in Amhara, he established a Fano faction, Amhara Popular Force, and became its leader. As Tigrayan rebels failed to enter Gojjam, his faction engaged to counter the rebel advance in Western Wollo along with Ethiopian government forces. Zemene was once imprisoned by Bahir Dar police in allegation of killing of a police officer on 11 September 2022. Mulan Tadese, his legal mentor, confirmed that Zemene was released from Bahir Dar prison on 3 June 2023, where the verdict raised a question on absolving his release about the validity of evidence against him. Zemene was used to hiding from government authority amidst crackdowns against Fano members, who alleged that Fano would brought violence and destabilization in the region. In June 2022, Zemene commented the ongoing situation of Tigray War in an interview that "there are thousands of Fano militants presently under my control, and shortly they will shift into millions. We don’t believe the Amhara police forces or the federal army as opposing. But some individuals belong to the Fano who do."
