= Afar National Unity Revolutionary Front =

Afar paramilitary group in Ethiopia

- Qafar Agatih Inkiinoh Uguugumoh Fooca
- Flag of the Afar National Unity Revolutionary Front
- Chairman: Ibrahim Osman Aliyu
- Vice Chairman: Yayo Wellih Ebrahim
- Secretary General: Hasalle Abakir Baddi
- Dates active: September 2026-present
- Allegiance: Ethiopian Peoples' Forces Coalition for Survival
- Ideology: Afar Nationalism
- Size: ~300
- Wars: 2026 Ethiopian offensive

The Afar National Unity Revolutionary Front (Afar: Qafar Agatih Inkiinoh Uguugumoh Fooca, ANURF) is an ethno-nationalist Afar paramilitary group created by Ibrahim Osman Aliyu between 2025–2026. The organization is colloquially known as Agugumo (Afar: Agugumo, lit. 'Great Change')

== Creation ==
On 25 April 2025, local Afar Region politician and former mayor of Berhale, Ibrahim Osman Aliyu, fled to Eritrea with 300 supporters and members of the Afar Special Forces. Ibrahim cited perceived "neglect" of the Afar Region by the Abiy government following the Ethiopia–Tigray peace agreement as the cause of his defection. According to Mohamed Kheir Omer, writing in Pan African Review, the Afar Region was one of two Ethiopian states whose Special Forces still formally existed as of October 2026, and the Afar Special Forces were the only Special Forces unit with mechanized infantry. The unit was trained by the Eritrean Defence Forces in 2020. Ibrahim Osman Aliyu was alleged to be in good standing with the US Ambassador to Ethiopia, Ervin Massinga, as well as Afar Regional State President Awol Arba prior to his defection to Eritrea.

Ibrahim's group became known as the Afar National Unity Revolutionary Front (ANURF) by September 2026, during the September 2026 military conflict between the Ethiopian National Defense Force and the Ethiopian Peoples' Forces Coalition for Survival, of which ANURF was declared to be one of the seven member organizations.

== Aims ==
In late September 2026, during the 2026 Ethiopian offensive, Ibrahim stated that the fighting was "against the Prosperity Party, not the Afar people or fighter groups".
