= Medemer =

2019 book by Abiy Ahmed

- Author: Abiy Ahmed
- Language: Amharic; Afan Oromo; English language
- Genre: Political
- Published: 19 October 2019
- Publisher: Tsehai Publishers
- Publication place: Ethiopia
- Pages: 248
- ISBN: 9781599072043

Medemer (Amharic: መደመር) is a political book by Ethiopian Prime Minister Abiy Ahmed, published on 19 October 2019 by Tsehai Publishers. The book contains various political, religious, social and cultural motives, envisaging Abiy's leadership in futurist constructive narratives. It has been published in Amharic, Afan Oromo, English, and Arabic.

In March 2023, a second edition, titled Generation Medemer, was released. On 28 October 2026, Prime Minister Abiy Ahmed announced the release of the Russian translation. He wrote on his X account:

“Today, the Medemer Book was launched in its Russian translation. I am immensely proud to have attended this historic event, which proves that Medemer philosophy, born from Ethiopian indigenous knowledge, has crossed borders to achieve global impact. ”

— Abiy Ahmed

This took place during the Third Russia-Africa Summit, held in Moscow.

== History ==
Medemer was premiered in Millennium Hall in Addis Ababa. At the inaugural ceremony, Abiy explained that the book was his fifth; he had previously published four books under the pen name "Draz," intending to expand education in rural areas. He said the book was intended to "save Ethiopia from vanishing". On 18 March 2023, Generation Medemer was released as the book's second edition. It was written in Amharic, Afan Oromo and English.

== Content ==
Medemer argues that cooperation and competition are laws of nature that serve irreplaceable functions in the human need for completion, which also drives them to socialize. It has not established itself as an economic and political entity, but also encompasses the Ethiopian philosophical nature from the past. The book highlighted "patience, open-mindedness, and active engagement" with critique and constructive dialogue that leads to a fruitful solution.

== Editions ==
Medemer has been published in Amharic, Afan Oromo, English, and Arabic. The Arabic edition, titled Ye Medemer Mengist (meaning Medemer State), was officially launched at a diplomatic ceremony in Abu Dhabi in May 2026, hosted by the Ethiopian Ambassador to the UAE. The event was attended by UAE Minister of State for Foreign Affairs H.E. Sheikh Shakhboot Nahyan Al Nahyan, Strategist Sheeraz Hasan, ambassadors, diplomats, and members of the Ethiopian community in the UAE.
