= A2 road (Ethiopia) =

Road in Ethiopia

A2 Road

Route information
- Maintained by Ethiopia National Highways Authority

Major junctions
- North end: Addis Ababa
- South end: Aksum

Location
- Country: Ethiopia

Highway system
- Transport in Ethiopia

The A2 Road is a national route in Ethiopia. It serves as a principal trunk highway for an entire distance of 1,013 kilometers. The road runs from north to south from Addis Ababa to Eritrea.

== Route ==
The A2 trunk road in Ethiopia stretches from the capital Addis Ababa to the northern border area near Eritrea, traversing the eastern slopes of the Ethiopian Highlands.

The route can be divided into three sections: the southern part, from Addis Ababa to Kombolcha, runs northeasterly and serves as an alternative transit route to Djibouti. The central part, from Kombolcha to Adigrat, is a primary north–south route, albeit with a somewhat secondary character due to the absence of major cities, except for Dessie. The northernmost part, from Adigrat to Adwa and Aksum, is an east–west route with significant elevation changes and winding roads.

Trans-Africa Highway 6 coincides with the A2 between Weldiya and Dessie, diverging from its east–west trajectory to run north–south.

== History ==
Before it was known as A2 road, the channel was the most traveled way leading to Asmara and Massawa in Red sea port of Ethiopia. Originally designated as Route 1, the road was renumbered in 2013 to reflect the changed circumstances. The A2 now terminates at Adigrat and turns west towards Aksum, while the northern section to the Eritrean border was renumbered as the B20, also a paved road.

In the 21st century, upgrades have focused primarily on the A1 route to the port of Djibouti, due to its flatter terrain and priority status. Although the southern A2 section was traditionally part of the Djibouti route, the A1 has received more attention in recent years.

=== Upgrades in Addis Ababa ===
In Addis Ababa between 2008 and 2010, the A2 road received many improvements. This was when the road expanded into dual-lane highways with large roundabouts located in eastern parts of the city, which coincided with the move to create new expansion districts. A 13-kilometer section east of the Ring Road was upgraded on the A2, although it lacks grade-separated features. Separate lanes were previously added to older parts of the route between the city centre and the Ring Road. Moreover, two tunnels were built below roundabouts from 2013 to 2015 so that more facilities have been added to this road network.
