= Meketaw Mamo =

Ethiopian rebel leader of the Fano militia

- መከታው ማሞ
- Born: Termaber, North Shewa, Ethiopia
- Military career
- Allegiance: Fano
- Service years: 2021–present
- Commands: Shewa Province Command
- Conflicts: Tigray War; Fano insurgency

Meketaw Mamo (Amharic: መከታው ማሞ) is an Ethiopian rebel leader and commander of the Shewa faction of the Fano militia.

== Life and career ==
Meketaw Mamo was born in Termaber district in North Shewa, Ethiopia. He completed his secondary schooling in Shewa Robit before shifting to business career. There, he had worked in various business roles. During this time, it was reported that Meketaw has not involved in any political and armed struggle until the 2021 Ataye town attacks. Following the attacks, he joined the Fano militia and participated in the Tigray War alongside Ethiopian government forces against Tigrayan rebels.

After the Tigray War ended, Meketaw and his associates engaged in persistent armed clashes and insurgency in Shewa Robit. Therefore, he fled the town to neighboring areas. As the Fano insurgency began in 2023, Meketaw began aligning with other Fano factions to fight the government forces and established Shewa Province Command in North Shewa.
