= Alula Aba Nega Airport =

Airport in Mekelle, Tigray Region, Ethiopia

Alula Aba Nega Airport ኣሉላ ኣባ ነጋ ዓለም ለኸ መዕረፍ ነፈርቲ (Tigrinya) አሉላ አባ ነጋ ዓለም አቀፍ የአየር ማረፊያ (Amharic)
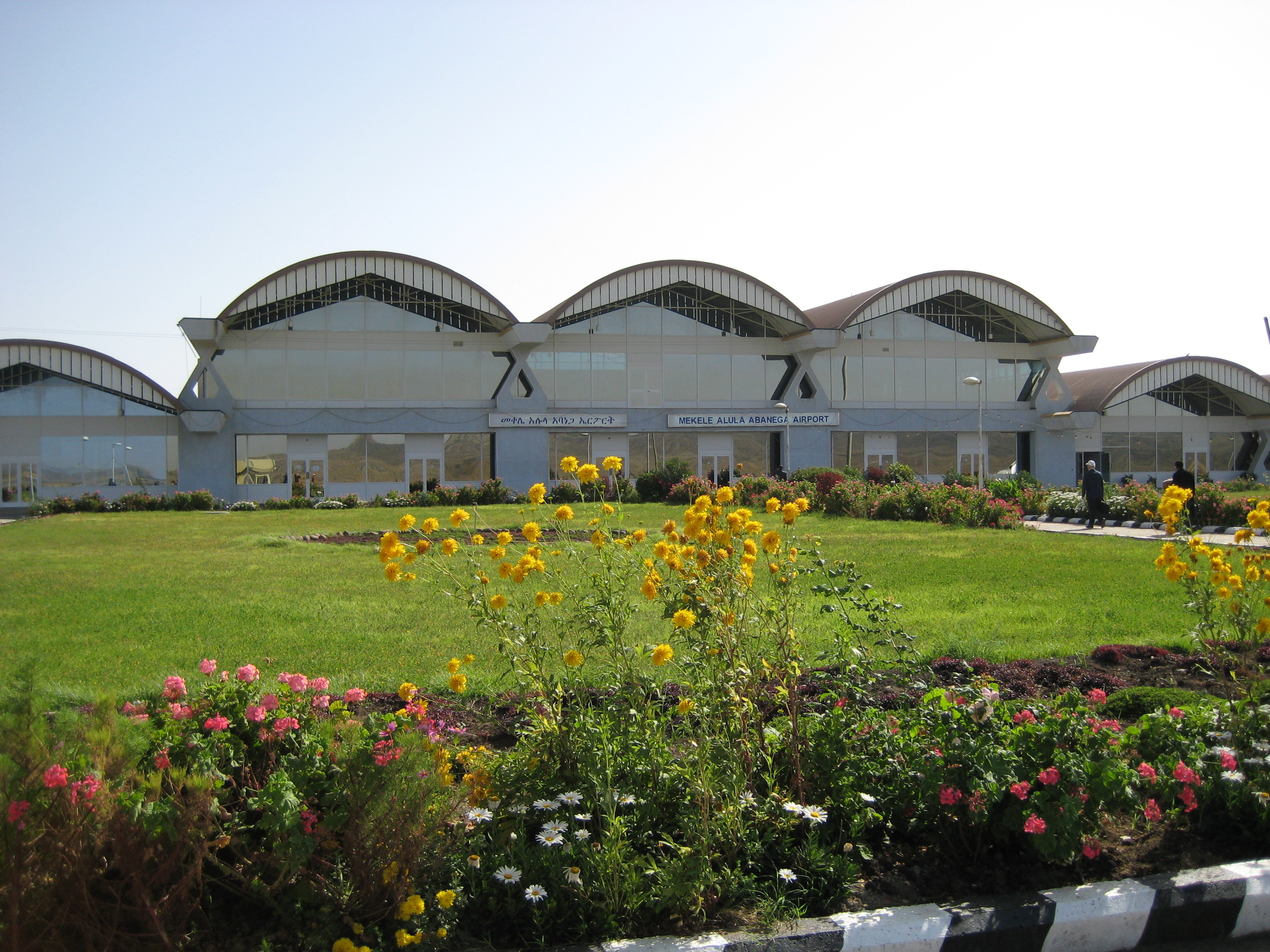
- IATA: MQX; ICAO: HAMK

Summary
- Airport type: Public
- Operator: Ethiopian Airports Enterprise
- Serves: Mekelle, Ethiopia
- Elevation AMSL: 7,403 ft (2,256 m)
- Coordinates: 13°28′02″N 039°32′00″E

Map
- Location in Ethiopia (Tigray region in red)

Runways
Direction	Length		Surface
Direction	m	ft	Surface
11/29	3,604	11,825	Asphalt

Alula Aba Nega Airport (IATA: MQX, ICAO: HAMK), also known as Mekelle Airport, is a public airport serving Mekelle, the capital city of the Tigray Region in northern Ethiopia. The airport is located 10 km (6 miles) southeast of the city. In September 2026, Tigrayan forces reportedly seized control of the airport, and Ethiopian Airlines suspended flights to the city.

== History ==
This airport was built in the late 1990s, to replace an older one located 7 km (4 miles) from Mekelle. The airport was named after the 19th century Ethiopian military leader Ras Alula, also known as Alula Aba Nega. He is well known for his battles against Italy, the Ottoman Turks, Egypt and the Battle of Adwa. When the airport first opened, it had one unpaved runway that was 3,000 metres (9,843 feet) long, with 21 flights to Addis Ababa, 4 to Shire and 2 to Humera.

=== 2026 seizure ===
On the night of 22 to 23 September 2026, Tigrayan forces reportedly took control of the airport from the federal police, according to local sources cited by Reuters. The takeover came amid deteriorating relations between the federal government and the Tigray People's Liberation Front (TPLF), which had fought the Tigray War against the federal government before the two sides signed the Pretoria Agreement in November 2022. It followed an announcement days earlier by the TPLF and six other armed groups that they had formed an alliance seeking to overthrow the government of Prime Minister Abiy Ahmed. Ethiopian Airlines suspended its flights to Mekelle, as well as to Shire and Axum, citing the situation in the Tigray Region.

== Facilities ==
The airport lies at an elevation of 7,406 feet (2,257 m) above mean sea level. It has one runway designated 11/29 with an asphalt surface measuring 3,604 by 43 metres (11,824 ft × 141 ft).

== Airlines and destinations ==
Airlines	Destinations
Ethiopian Airlines	Addis Ababa

As of 23 September 2026, Ethiopian Airlines had suspended all flights to Mekelle.

== Accidents and incidents ==
- On 22 August 1982, a Douglas DC-3 ET-AHP of Ethiopian Airlines was damaged beyond repair in a take-off accident.
- On 18 January 2024, an Ethiopian Airlines Dash-8 crash-landed at the airport, with its left main landing gear collapsing and the left engine prop striking the runway.
