= Sidama National Liberation Front =

Rebel group in Sidama Region of Ethiopia

- Flag of the Sidama Liberation Front
- Dates active: 1999 – 2021
- Active regions: Sidama Region Ethiopia
- Ideology: Sidama self-determination
- Status: Inactive
- Part of: AFD (2006-2021); UFEFCF (2021)
- Website: Official website

The Sidama National Liberation Front, also known as Sidama Liberation Front (abbreviated SNLF or SLF) was a rebel group in the Sidama Region of Ethiopia. The SNLF allied with the Oromo Liberation Front in 2012 and the Ogaden National Liberation Front in 2015 against the Tigray People's Liberation Front.

As of 2021, the ACLED declared the SNLF to be an "inactive" organization that is "neither well known nor well developed even among its own community".

== Creation ==
The Sidama National Liberation Front was established c. 1999.

== Aims ==
The SNLF describes its aim as self-determination of the Sidama people. In 2016, SNLF representatives met with other groups in Asmara, creating the People's Alliance for Freedom and Democracy, which protested against the "brutal suppression of the unarmed protesters in Oromia by the TPLF". The alliance protested against multinational corporations and the TPLF-dominated government expropriating natural resources from poor agro-pastoral communities and displacing the inhabitants.

== Leadership ==
In 2017, Denboba Natie was a member of the SNLF's executive committee.

== Alliances ==
In 2012, the SNLF (at the time, SLF), made a joint statement with the Oromo Liberation Front, accusing the TPLF of deliberately creating violent conflict between Sidama and Oromo groups "through multifaceted attacks". The SNLF and OLF together called for "subjugated peoples in general" and the Oromo and Sidama to avoid being lured into conflict and "instead form their historically effective common elders committee and resolve their conflicts in the established traditional way."

As of 2015, the SNLF was allied with two other rebel groups, the Ogaden National Liberation Front and the Oromo Liberation Front, and was fighting against the government of Ethiopia, dominated by the Ethiopian People's Revolutionary Democratic Front (EPDRF).
