= A1 road (Ethiopia) =

Road in Ethiopia

A1 Road

Route information
- Maintained by Ethiopia National Highways Authority

Major junctions
- North end: Addis Ababa
- South end: Bure

Location
- Country: Ethiopia

Highway system
- Transport in Ethiopia

The A1 Road is a road in Ethiopia that spans a total distance of 802 kilometers. The road passes an arc-shaped route through the central and eastern regions of the country, connecting the capital city Addis Ababa to the border with Eritrea at Bure. The route passes through Adama and Awash. A branch of the A1 extends to the border with Djibouti, linking Ethiopia and its neighboring countries.

== Route ==
The A1 trunk road in Ethiopia connects the central highlands to the eastern region, providing an international route to Eritrea and Djibouti. The middle section, between Addis Ababa and Adama, is a corridor passing through urban areas, with the Addis Ababa–Adama Expressway running parallel.

The road descends from the highlands towards Awash, then traverses a region in eastern Ethiopia. A 25-kilometer branch, A1a, connects to Djibouti.

Beyond the branch, the A1 deteriorates into an unpaved, gravel road leading to the Eritrean border. On the Eritrean side, the P7 road continues to the port city of Assab.

== History ==
The A1 Road was primarily developed during the Italian administration between 1936 and 1940, known as the "Strada Imperiali" from Addis Ababa to Assab. Two routes connected the central highlands: the western route via Kombolcha and the eastern route via Awash, converging south of Mile.

Following Eritrea's independence in 1993, the port of Assab continued to facilitate Ethiopian exports until 1998, when the border closure abruptly redirected all exports to the port of Djibouti. The 25-kilometer branch to Djibouti had already established the A1 as the de facto main route between Ethiopia and Djibouti.

The Eritrean–Ethiopian war resulted in damage to the road, particularly in the border area, with several bridges destroyed.

=== Road number history ===
The A1 Road was previously designated as multiple route numbers. The section from Addis Ababa to Awash was Route 4, the section from Awash to Mile was Route 18, and the section from Mile to the Eritrean border was Route 2. In 2013, a new road numbering system was implemented, and this route was unified under the single designation of A1.
