= Amhara Fano National Movement =

Amhara Fano militia group

- የአማራ ፋኖ ብሔራዊ ንቅናቄ
- Leader: Ras Arbegna Zemene Kassie
- Founded: 17 January 2026; 8 months ago
- Merger of: Amhara Fano National Force; Amhara Fano People's Organization
- Active regions: Amhara Region, Ethiopia
- Ideology: Amhara nationalism
- Status: Active

The Amhara Fano National Movement (AFNM; Amharic: የአማራ ፋኖ ብሔራዊ ንቅናቄ) is an ethno-nationalist Amhara militia group fighting against the Ethiopian National Defense Force (ENDF) and its allies to overcome perceived threats to the Amhara people. AFNM is a unified political and military organization officially established on 17 January 2026. It was formed as a merger of various decentralized Fano factions—primarily the Amhara Fano National Force and the Amhara Fano Popular Organisation—under a single command structure and ideological framework.

== Context of formation ==
The AFNM's establishment follows years of decentralized insurgency in the Amhara region that began in April 2023. Previous attempts at unification—such as the formation of the Amhara Fano National Force (AFNF) in May 2025—faced challenges due to regional fragmentation and internal leadership rivalries. The January 2026 merger aims to correct these "weaknesses and gaps" by adopting a formal charter and a committee-based governance model.

== Current status ==
=== Control ===
Fano militias have claimed to control over 80% of the Amhara region, primarily rural areas, while the federal government retains control of major cities and highways.

=== Conflict ===
Fighting between AFNM forces and the Ethiopian National Defense Force (ENDF) remains ongoing across multiple zones, including North Wollo and East Gojjam.

=== International appeal ===
The AFNM has called on the international community to cease support for the current federal administration and has urged humanitarian organizations to expand aid to affected populations.
