= Berhale =

Town in Afar Region, Ethiopia

Berhale Berahle, Berahile
- Town
- Market in Berhale

- Location in Ethiopia
- Coordinates: 13°51′43″N 40°01′17″E
- Country: Ethiopia
- Region: Afar
- Zone: Kilbet Rasu
- District: Berhale
- Control: Afar National Unity Revolutionary Front
- Elevation: 639 m (2,096 ft)
- Time zone: UTC+3 (EAT)
- Climate: BSh

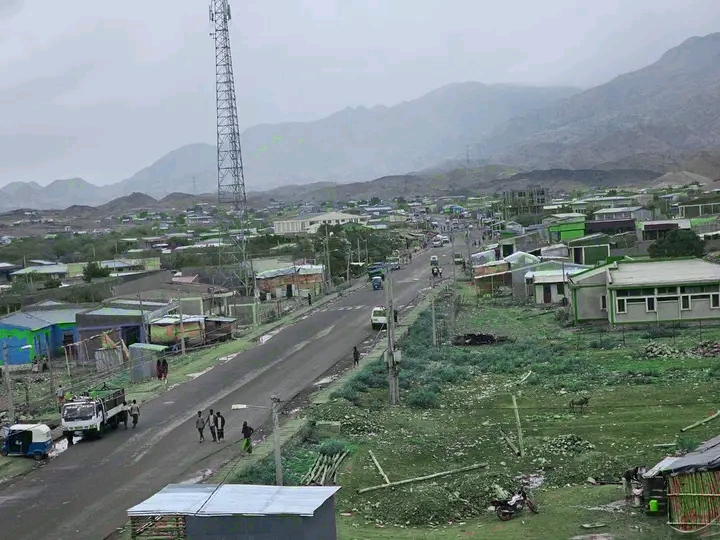
Berahle town Street

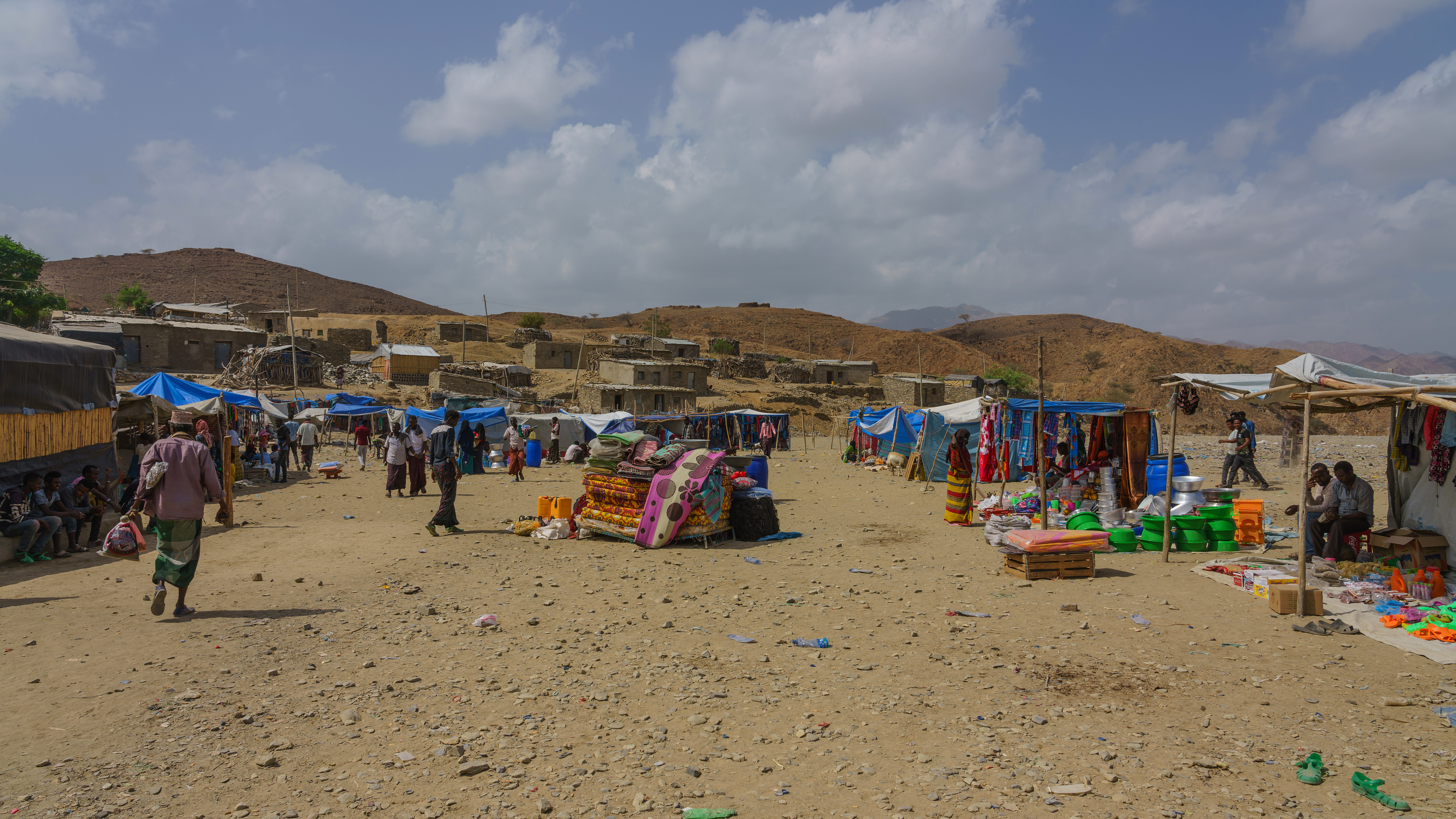
Market in Berhale

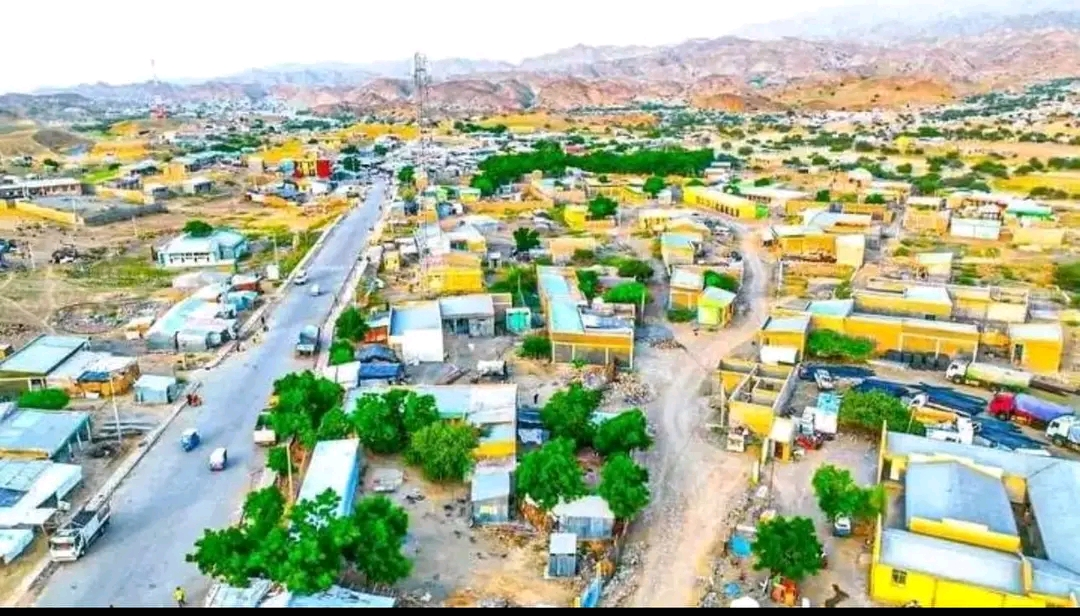
Barahle town, northern Afar

Berahle (also transliterated Barahle and Berahile) is a town in north-eastern Ethiopia. Located in Kilbet Rasu, Afar Region, this town has an altitude of 639 meters above sea level. It is the largest town in Berhale woreda.

Philip Briggs describes this town as an "unexpectedly large and attractive town, set in a valley below stark twin peaks", which although "neither truly of the highlands nor truly of the desert" Berhale, "with its combination of typically Tigrayan stone houses and more austere Afar huts...is an agreeable point of transition between the two natural realms." This town was reported as having phone service by 2004; electrical service was introduced in September 2006, when the Ethiopian Electric Power Corporation installed a 120 kilowatt generator, street lights, and 200 electric meters. At the time, electrical service was provided from 6 pm to midnight.

== History ==
Records at the Nordic Africa Institute website provide details of a primary school in Berhale during the year 1968.

Five British citizens and their Ethiopian guides were kidnapped 4 March 2007 after visiting Berhale.

=== Tigray War ===
In January 2022, Tigray People's Liberation Front shelled Berhale as part of an offensive into Afar during the Tigray War. Many people fled towards the regional capital of Semera as refugees.

On February 23 of that same year, militants entered an Eritrean refugee camp, killing at least five people. Thousands were displaced and several women were abducted. Several refugees were separated from their families during the attack and experienced emotional distress. While no organization claimed responsibility, the Tigray People's Liberation Front was widely suspected of being responsible.

The United Nations later acknowledged the attack in a statement. The Addis Standard estimated a month later that 43,000 people had been displaced from the settlement during the war.

== Demographics ==
According to the 2007 census conducted by the Central Statistical Agency, Berhale has a total population of 6,098, of whom 3,563 are men and 2,535 women. A total of 863 households were counted in this woreda, resulting in an average of 7.1 persons to a household, and 807 housing units.
