= Gumuz People's Democratic Movement =

Ethiopian armed rebel group

The Gumuz People’s Democratic Movement or GPDM is an armed rebel group based in the Benishangul-Gumuz Region of Ethiopia. They were a participant in the Benishangul-Gumuz conflict and signed a peace agreement with the regional government in October 2022.

== See also ==
- Benishangul People's Liberation Movement
