= Benishangul People's Liberation Movement =

Armed group in Ethiopia

- Established: 2007 (19 years ago)
- Founders: Abdulwahab Mehadi
- Location: Benishangul-Gumuz Region
- Country: Ethiopia

Benishangul People's Liberation Movement or BPLM is an armed rebel group based in the Benishangul-Gumuz Region of Ethiopia. BPLM signed peace deals with the federal Ethiopian government in 2005, 2013 and 2022.

== Creation ==
According to Tigrai Online, Benishangul People's Liberation Movement was created in 1996 as an armed rebel movement. An Ethiopian prosecutor claimed that BPLM was created by Abdulwahab Mehadi in 2007.

== Aims ==
BPLM claimed in 2018 that the Berta people and the Gumuz people were "oppressed by all three of Ethiopia's most powerful communities" and that the Oromo Liberation Front had attacked local inhabitants in Kamashi Zone.

== Leadership ==
According to an Ethiopian prosecutor, Abdulwahab Mehadi headed BPLM from 2007 to 2015. Husien Ahmed was one BPLM's leaders in 2013.

== Peace processes ==
BPLM signed a peace deal with the federal Ethiopian government in 2005. Fighting resumed in 2006.

In June 2013, BPLM and the federal government agreed to a peace deal in 2013. BPLM members were promised an amnesty from prosecution and governmental support under the deal. BPLM detainees were released. Fighting resumed in 2019.

== Eritrean support ==
BPLM received support, including military training, in Eritrea, according to an Ethiopian prosecutor and Husien Ahmed, one of BPLM's leaders.

== Military actions ==
In 2015, ten BPLM members were charged with armed attacks against the Ethiopian National Defense Force (ENDF) in a 30-minute gun battle at Bulfadto in Asosa.

== See also ==
- Gumuz People’s Democratic Movement
