= Ethiopian Regional Special Forces =

Gendarmerie and paramilitary force in Ethiopia

- የኢትዮጵያ ልዩ ሀይል
- Active: 2007–present
- Country: Ethiopia
- Allegiance: Ethiopian Federal Police
- Branch: Ethiopian National Defense Force
- Type: Paramilitary; Gendarmerie
- Role: Gendarmerie; Reserve army Counter-insurgency; Internal security Light infantry
- Size: 105,000 active personnel; 85,000 reserve personnel; 20,000 paramilitaries
- Equipment: AK-47; AKM; Type 56; RPK; PKM; RPD; DShK; Dragunov SVD; FN FAL; RPG-7; WZ-551; ZU-23-2
- Engagements: Insurgency in Ogaden; Ethiopian civil conflict (2018–present); OLA insurgency; Benishangul-Gumuz conflict; Afar–Somali clashes; Tigray War; Al-Fashaga conflict; al-Shabaab invasion of Ethiopia; Fano insurgency; Dacawalay conflict; 2026 Ethiopian offensive

Commanders
- Current commander: Birhanu Jula (Chief of General Staff)

The Ethiopian Regional Special Forces (Amharic: የኢትዮጵያ ልዩ ሀይል) are a gendarmerie and paramilitary force in Ethiopia. They were first established in 2007 by the order of the federal government in order to counter the insurgency in the Somali Region, and have the specialized task to maintain regional and nationwide security, to counter any form of insurgencies and terrorist incidents.

In 2015, the Ethiopian government announced that the Regional Special Forces were fully integrated.

== Background and role ==
The Regional Special Forces were first introduced in Ethiopia by the government and foreign assistance in 2007 during the Insurgency in Ogaden through the establishment of the Somali Region's Liyu Police. They evolved to operate in all regions in Ethiopia and restructured to operate similar to that of the US National Guard. The Regional Special Forces are a gendarmerie as well as a reserve force deployed by the federal government to maintain security primarily against insurgencies. The regional forces are heavily armed and receive military training, and they grew exponentially in size following the recruitment of senior Ethiopian military officers into their ranks. As the Regional Special Forces do not have legal provision compared to the federal and regional government police, all regional state governments use the Regional Special Forces, remaining the dominant figurehead behind settling international border security and intrastate conflicts, that are mandated by the federal government forces.

On 15 April 2015, the government announced that the unit was fully integrated. The role and status of the Regional Special Forces have been contested. On 6 April 2023, the Ethiopian government decided to dismantle the Regional Special Forces unit in the Amhara Region (Amhara Special Forces) by integrating them into the regular Ethiopian military, the Federal Police and the regional police unit which resulted in large-scale protests that ultimately lead to the start of the ongoing War in Amhara.

== Regional branches ==
=== Somali Region's Special Police (Liyu Police) ===
The Liyu Police is the Regional Special Forces' contingent in the Somali Region (Ogaden), located in eastern Ethiopia. They were the first and original contingent of the regional forces when it was established in 2007, and are tasked with the maintaining the security in the Somali Region as well as the safeguarding and protection of the regional chief administrator (governor). In 2013, the forces had between 10,000 and 14,000 personnel. The force strength increased to 42,000 in 2017. Since its establishment, the Liyu Police has gained notoriety for its brutal counter-insurgency operations and methods, as well as allegations of human rights abuses.

=== Oromia Regional Special Forces ===
The Oromia Regional Special Forces maintains security situation in the Oromia Region. The Oromia regional forces have been accused of collaborating and being complicit in the atrocities of the Oromo Liberation Army (OLA) in western Oromia. In May 2024, the OLA and Oromia regional forces were accused as perpetrators for an attack in the Bulen district of the Benishangul-Gumuz Region.

== Former branches ==
=== Amhara Regional Special Forces ===
The Amhara Regional Special Forces was the regional and ethnic Amhara contingent of the Ethiopian Regional Special Forces responsible for maintaining peace and security within the Amhara Region and was headed by Tefera Mamo until his arrest and imprisonment in 2022. In April 2023, the Ethiopian government's plan to dismantle the paramilitary structure of the regional forces and integrate them into the ENDF, Federal Police, and regional police units led to massive protests in the Amhara region that ultimately led to the outbreak of the Fano insurgency.

=== Tigray Regional Special Forces ===
The Tigray Regional Special Forces were the Tigrayan contingent of the Regional Special Forces until November 2020, when its personnel and the gendarmerie leadership rebelled against federal authority and defected to form the Tigray Defense Forces (TDF) during the outbreak of the Tigray War.

== See also ==
- Liyu Police
