= History of the Federal Democratic Republic of Ethiopia =

History of Ethiopia since 1991

Following the end of the civil war in 1991, the Federal Democratic Republic of Ethiopia was established with the 1995 constitution, which formalized a system of ethnic federalism. It aimed at undermining long-standing ethnic imperial rule, reducing ethnic tensions, promoting regional autonomy, and upholding unqualified rights to self-determination and secession in a state with more than 80 different ethnic groups. But the constitution is divisive, both among Ethiopian nationalists who believe it undermines centralized authority and fuels inter-ethnic conflict, and among ethnic federalists who fear that the development of its vague components could lead to authoritarian centralization or even the maintenance of minority ethnic hegemony.

Parliamentary elections since 1995 have taken place every five years since enactment. All but one of these have resulted in government by members of the Ethiopian People's Revolutionary Democratic Front (EPRDF) political coalition, under three prime ministers (Meles Zenawi, Hailemariam Desalegn and Abiy Ahmed). The EPRDF was under the effective control of the Tigray People's Liberation Front (TPLF), which represents a small ethnic minority. In 2019 the EPRDF, under Abiy, was dissolved and he inaugurated the pan-ethnic Prosperity Party which won the 2021 Ethiopian Election, returning him as prime minister. But both political entities were different kinds of responses to the ongoing tension between constitutional ethnic federalism and the Ethiopian state's authority. Over the same period, and all administrations, a range of major conflicts with ethnic roots have occurred or continued, and the press and availability of information have been controlled. There has also been dramatic economic growth and liberalization, which has itself been attributed to, and used to justify, authoritarian state policy.

== Background ==
Emblem of Federal Democratic Republic of Ethiopia, since 1995

Ethiopia has more than 80 distinct ethnic groupings, each with its own size, language, religion, and culture. The top seven groups make up 83% of the population, according to the 2007 census. With only a 23.2% urbanization rate, it is primarily a rural nation (2023) and exhibits a wide variety of topography that impacts agricultural and economic activity. The significance of federalism in Ethiopia lies in this diversity and the history of the nation's reunification. Ethiopia's history has often been about the centralization and decentralization of power.

Historically, the kingdom of Abyssinia, as it was generally called before the mid-19th century, consisted mainly of the Amhara and Tigrayans. These northern people share a similar language, culture and customs and now comprise c. 24% and 6%, respectively, of modern Ethiopia. Tewodros II (1855–68) unified Ethiopia's north from 1855. His successor Yohannes IV (1872–89) embarked on a series of brutal military campaigns between 1880–1889 to conquer and annex the southern and eastern regions, namely western Oromo, Sidama, Gurage, Wolayta and other groups, producing approximately the current national borders. The conquest involved mass killings, enslavement, land confiscation and forcible conversion to Ethiopian Orthodox Christianity, motivated by a cultural contempt for what were considered inferior peoples.

The inhabitants of the southern states had different languages and customs; most were Muslim. The most populous group, the Oromos (currently 34% of the population), occupied valuable agricultural and develop-able lands which now contain the capital Addis Ababa, the heart of urban Ethiopia and its industrial hub. That history is recalled even today by "land grabs" in southern Oromo heartlands by the ruling non-Oromo hegemony. There is similar competition for land and resources between the Amhara and Ethiopian Somalis in the north.

Ethiopian statehood has been internally controversial since the late 19th-century conquest by Emperor Menelik II. Questions of nationality were raised during the reign (1930-1974) of Emperor Haile Selassie, who introduced the country's first constitution in 1931. Eritrea was annexed in 1961, resulting in an armed uprising and the Eritrean War of Independence in 1962.

In 1974, a revolution was ignited by several classes as a response to the imperial government's failure to adapt to public demand on the economy, and a military coup ended Haile Selassie's government.

The military administration, known as the Derg and led by Mengistu Haile Mariam, was succeeded in 1987 by The People's Democratic Republic of Ethiopia (PDRE), which grew out of the Derg with Mengistu as President of Ethiopia leading a Marxist-Leninist one-party state. Over this period, the Ethiopian Empire was abolished and reversals of imperial policy came into effect. The feudal socioeconomic structure was dismantled. The nationalization of land was codified in 1975. In 1976, the Derg declared its goals for establishing scientific socialism through the "National Democratic Revolution Programme (NDRP)". The program affirmed the equality of ethnic groups in Ethiopia and self-determination through regional autonomy. However, power remained centralized, with support from the Soviet Union and other communist bloc countries. Military campaigns started by Haile Selassie continued: against the resistance within Eritrea and the Somali Ogaden invasion of 1977/78.

Famine, such as that of 1983–1985, reliance on foreign aid, and the decline of the world communist movement, undermined the Derg/PDRE administrations. The Soviet Union ended support of the PDRE in 1990. The Eritrean War of Independence and the Ethiopian Civil War brought about the end of the regime. It collapsed in May 1991 when the Ethiopian People's Revolutionary Democratic Front (EPRDF) entered Addis Ababa, dissolving the PDRE and bringing about the Transitional Government of Ethiopia.

== Overview ==
=== Tigray People's Liberation Front dominance (1991–2018) ===
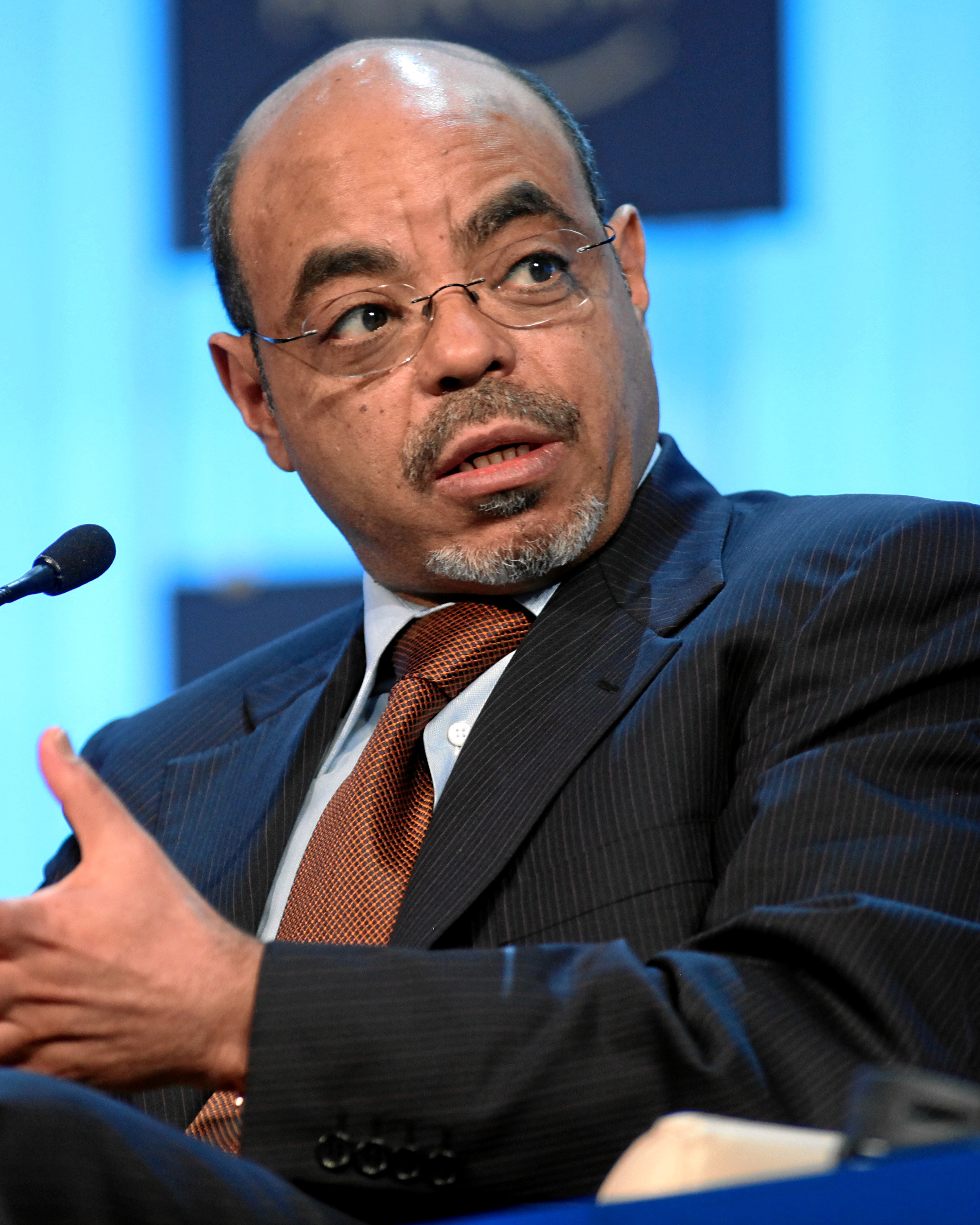
Former Ethiopian Prime Minister Meles Zenawi was one of the key founders of modern-day Ethiopia, under the FDRE system

In July 1991, the EPRDF convened a National Conference to establish the Transitional Government of Ethiopia composed of an 87-member Council of Representatives and guided by a national charter that functioned as a transitional constitution. In June 1992, the Oromo Liberation Front withdrew from the government; in March 1993, members of the Southern Ethiopia Peoples' Democratic Coalition also left the government. In 1994, a new constitution was written that established a parliamentary republic with a bicameral legislature and a judicial system.

The first multiparty election took place in May 1995, which was won by the EPRDF. The president of the transitional government, EPRDF leader Meles Zenawi, became the first Prime Minister of the Federal Democratic Republic of Ethiopia, and Negasso Gidada was elected its president. In post-Derg Ethiopia's Constitution (promulgated in 1995), the EPRDF not only took over the Derg's Soviet-inspired promise of cultural and administrative autonomy for the country's over 80 ethnic groups but also borrowed the right to independence (secession) from the Soviet Constitution. In this manner, an ethnoterritorial federal model of statehood was adopted for Ethiopia (as originally developed in the Central European empire of Austria-Hungary and in the interwar Soviet Union).

In October 2001, Lieutenant Girma Wolde-Giorgis was elected president. Ethiopia's 3rd multiparty election on 15 May 2005 was highly disputed, with many opposition groups claiming fraud. Though the Carter Center approved the pre-election conditions, it expressed its dissatisfaction with post-election events. European Union election observers cited state support for the EPRDF campaign, as well as irregularities in ballot counting and results publishing. The opposition parties gained more than 200 parliamentary seats, compared with just 12 in the 2000 elections. While most of the opposition representatives joined the parliament, some leaders of the CUD party who refused to take up their parliamentary seats were accused of inciting the post-election violence and were imprisoned. Amnesty International considered them "prisoners of conscience" and they were subsequently released.

A coalition of opposition parties and some individuals were established in 2009 to oust the government of the EPRDF in legislative elections of 2010. Meles' party, which has been in power since 1991, published its 65-page manifesto in Addis Ababa on 10 October 2009. The opposition won most votes in Addis Ababa, but the EPRDF halted the counting of votes for several days. After it ensued, it claimed the election, amidst charges of fraud and intimidation.

Meles died on 20 August 2012 in Brussels, where he was being treated for an unspecified illness. Deputy Prime Minister Hailemariam Desalegn was appointed as a new prime minister until the 2015 elections, and remained so afterwards with his party in control of every parliamentary seat.

Protests broke out across the country on 5 August 2016, and hundreds of protesters were subsequently shot and killed by police. The protesters demanded an end to human rights abuses, the release of political prisoners, a fairer redistribution of the wealth generated by over a decade of economic growth, and a return of Wolqayt District to the Amhara Region. Following these protests, Ethiopia declared a state of emergency on 6 October 2016, which was lifted in August 2017. On 16 February 2018, the government of Ethiopia declared another nationwide state of emergency following the resignation of Prime Minister Hailemariam Desalegn. Hailemariam was the first ruler in modern Ethiopian history to step down; previous leaders have died in office or been overthrown.

==== Eritrean–Ethiopian border conflict ====
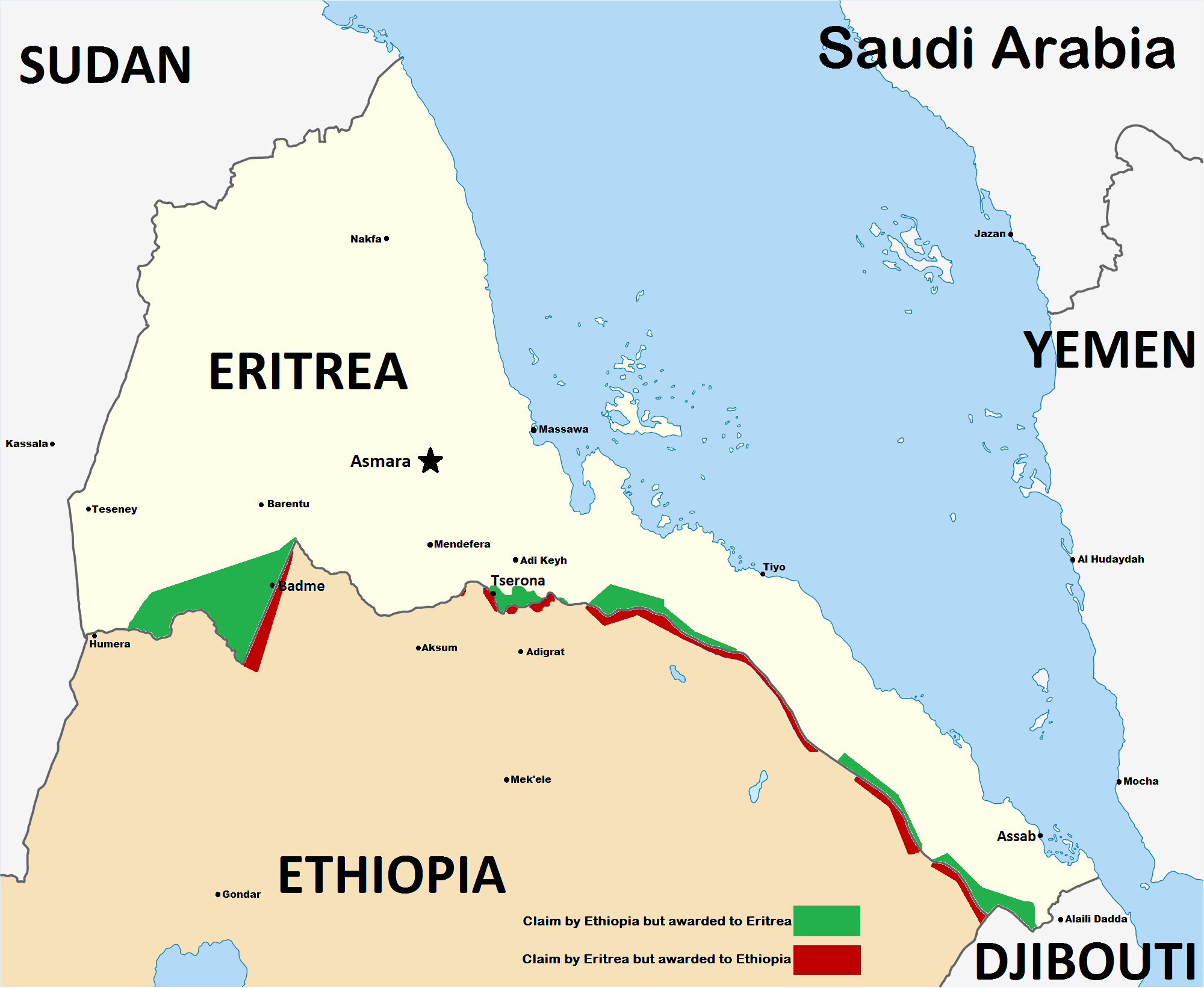
Map of the Eritrean–Ethiopian border conflict

In April 1993, Eritrea gained independence from Ethiopia after a national referendum. While relations between the two countries were initially friendly, by May 1998, a border dispute with Eritrea led to the Eritrean–Ethiopian War, which lasted until June 2000 and cost both countries an estimated $1 million a day, leaving a profoundly negative impact on their economies. Major combat operations ended after signing a peace treaty in December 2000; however, skirmishes and proxy conflicts between the two nations would continue until 2018.

==== War in Somalia ====
With the collapse of the Soviet Union, and with the rise of radical Islamism, Ethiopia again turned to the Western powers for alliance and assistance. After the September 11 attacks in 2001, the Ethiopian army began to train with US forces based out of the Combined Joint Task Force – Horn of Africa (CJTF-HOA) established in Djibouti, in counterterrorism and counterinsurgency. Ethiopia allowed the US to station military advisors at Camp Hurso.

In 2006, an Islamic organisation seen by many as having ties with al-Qaeda, the Islamic Courts Union (ICU), spread rapidly in Somalia. Ethiopia sent logistical support to the Transitional Federal Government opposing the Islamists. Finally, on December 20, 2006, active fighting broke out between the ICU and Ethiopian Army. As the Islamist forces were of no match against the Ethiopian regular army, they decided to retreat and merge among the civilians, and most of the ICU-held Somalia was quickly taken. Human Rights Watch accused Ethiopia of various abuses including indiscriminate killing of civilians during the Battle of Mogadishu (March–April 2007). Ethiopian forces pulled out of Somalia in January 2009, leaving a small African Union force and smaller Somali Transitional Government force to maintain the peace. Reports immediately emerged of religious fundamentalist forces occupying one of two former Ethiopian bases in Mogadishu shortly after withdrawal.

==== East Africa drought ====
In mid-2011, two consecutively missed rainy seasons precipitated the worst drought in East Africa seen in 60 years. Full recovery from the drought's effects did not occur until 2012, with long-term strategies by the national government in conjunction with development agencies believed to offer the most sustainable results.

=== Abiy Ahmed and the Prosperity Party (2018–present) ===
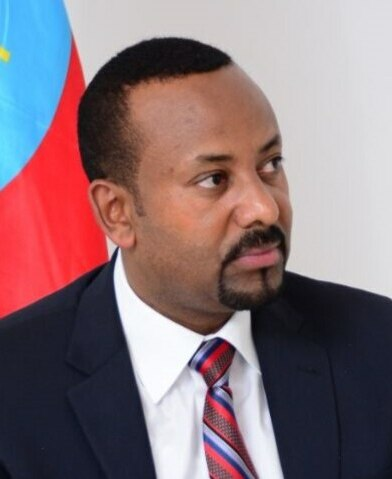
Prime Minister Abiy Ahmed in 2020

On 2 April 2018, Abiy Ahmed, an Oromo, was declared Prime Minister. In addition, Sahle-Work Zewde became the 4th president of Ethiopia, the first woman to hold the office. Early in his term, Prime Minister Abiy made a historic visit to Eritrea in 2018, ending the state of conflict between the two countries. For his efforts in ending the 20-year-long war between Ethiopia and Eritrea, Abiy Ahmed was awarded the Nobel prize for peace in 2019. After taking office in April 2018, Abiy released political prisoners, promised fair elections for 2019 and announced sweeping economic reforms. As of 6 June 2019, all the previously censored websites were made accessible again, over 13,000 political prisoners were released and hundreds of administrative staff were fired as part of the reforms.

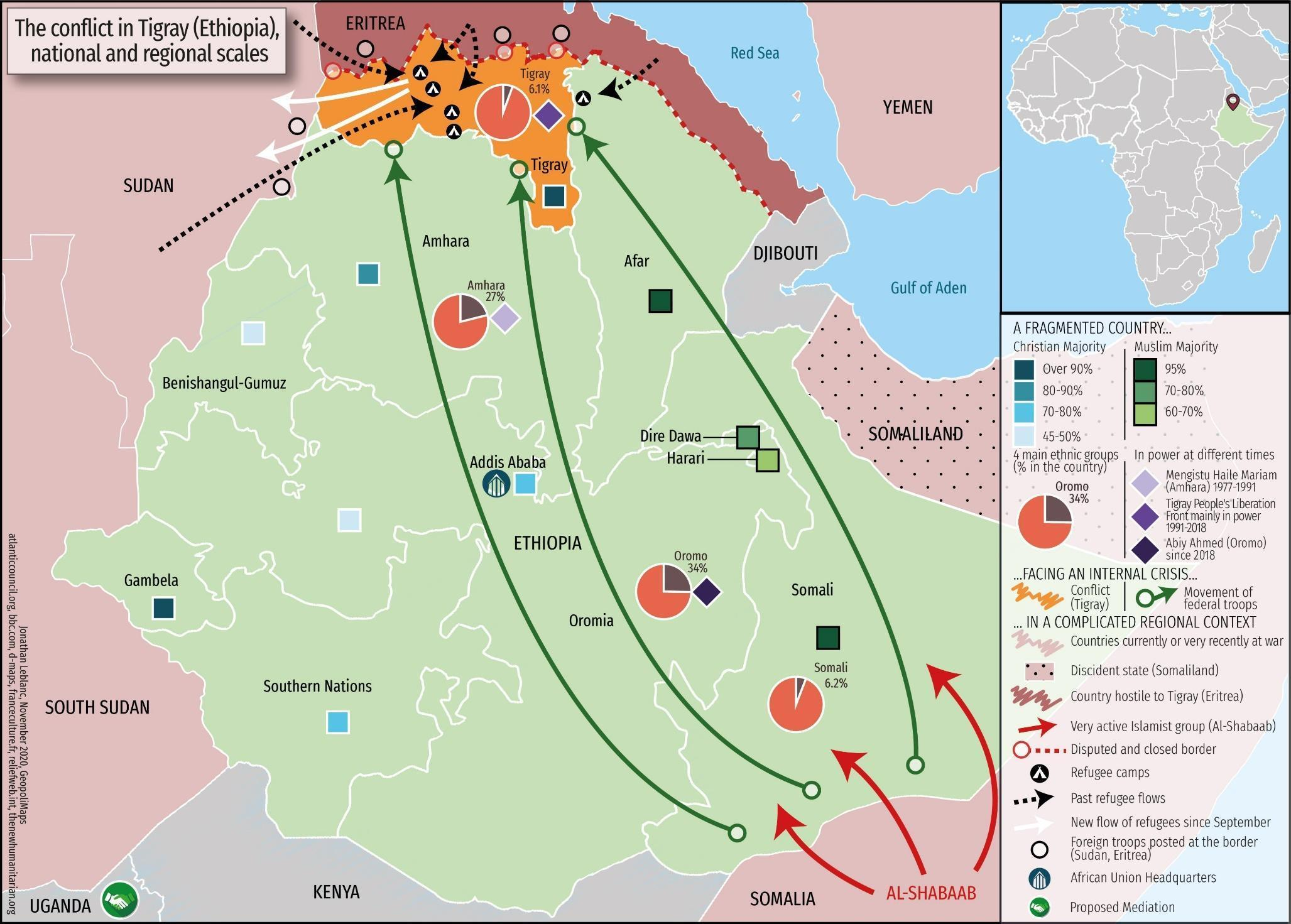
Map illustrating the Ethiopian civil conflict as of 2022; included are al-Shabaab attacks, the Tigray War zone, and the redeployment of federal troops from the southeast to the north.

An alliance between Fano, an Amhara youth militia and Qeerroo, its Oromo counterpart, played a crucial role in the bringing about the political and administrative changes associated with the premiership of Abiy Ahmed. During the Tigray War, Fano supported federal and regional security forces against rebels aligned with the Tigray People's Liberation Front (TPLF). Fano units have been accused of participating in ethnic massacres, including that of 58 Qemant people in Metemma during 10–11 January 2019, and of armed actions in Humera in November 2020.

Ethnic violence and political unrest rose throughout the 2010s and into the 2020s. There were Oromo–Somali clashes between the Oromo, who make up the largest ethnic group in the country, and the ethnic Somalis, leading to up to 400,000 have been displaced in 2017. Gedeo–Oromo clashes between the Oromo and the Gedeo people in the south of the country led to Ethiopia having the largest number of people to flee their homes in the world in 2018, with 1.4 million newly displaced people. Starting in 2019, in the Metekel conflict, fighting in the Metekel Zone of the Benishangul-Gumuz Region in Ethiopia has reportedly involved militias from the Gumuz people against Amharas and Agaws. In March 2020, the leader of an Amhara militia called Fano, Solomon Atanaw, stated that they would not disarm until Metekel Zone and the Tigray Region districts of Welkait and Raya were returned to the control of Amhara Region. In September 2018, 23 people were killed in acts of ethnic violence against minorities in the Special Zone of Oromia near the Ethiopian capital Addis Ababa. 35 people were later killed in Addis Ababa and in the surrounding Oromia Special Zone during protests against what many regarded as a lack of a response from the government to the violence. Some were killed by police. Protests broke out across Ethiopia following the assassination of Oromo musician Hachalu Hundessa on 29 June 2020, leading to the deaths of at least 239 people.

On 22 June 2019, factions of the security forces of the region attempted a coup d'état against the regional government, during which the President of the Amhara Region, Ambachew Mekonnen, was assassinated. A bodyguard siding with the nationalist factions assassinated General Se'are Mekonnen – the Chief of the General Staff of the Ethiopian National Defense Force – as well as his aide, Major General Gizae Aberra. The Prime Minister's Office accused Brigadier General Asaminew Tsige, head of the Amhara region security forces, of leading the plot, and Tsige was shot dead by police near Bahir Dar on 24 June.

==== COVID-19 pandemic ====
The federal government, under the Prosperity Party, requested that the National Election Board of Ethiopia cancel elections for 2020 due to health and safety concerns about COVID-19. No official date was set for the next election at that time, but the government promised that once a vaccine was developed for COVID-19 that elections would move forward. The Tigrayan ruling party, TPLF, opposed canceling the elections and, when their request to the federal government to hold elections was rejected, the TPLF proceeded to hold elections anyway on 9 September 2020. They worked with regional opposition parties and included international observers in the election process. It was estimated that 2.7 million people participated in the election.

==== Tigray War ====
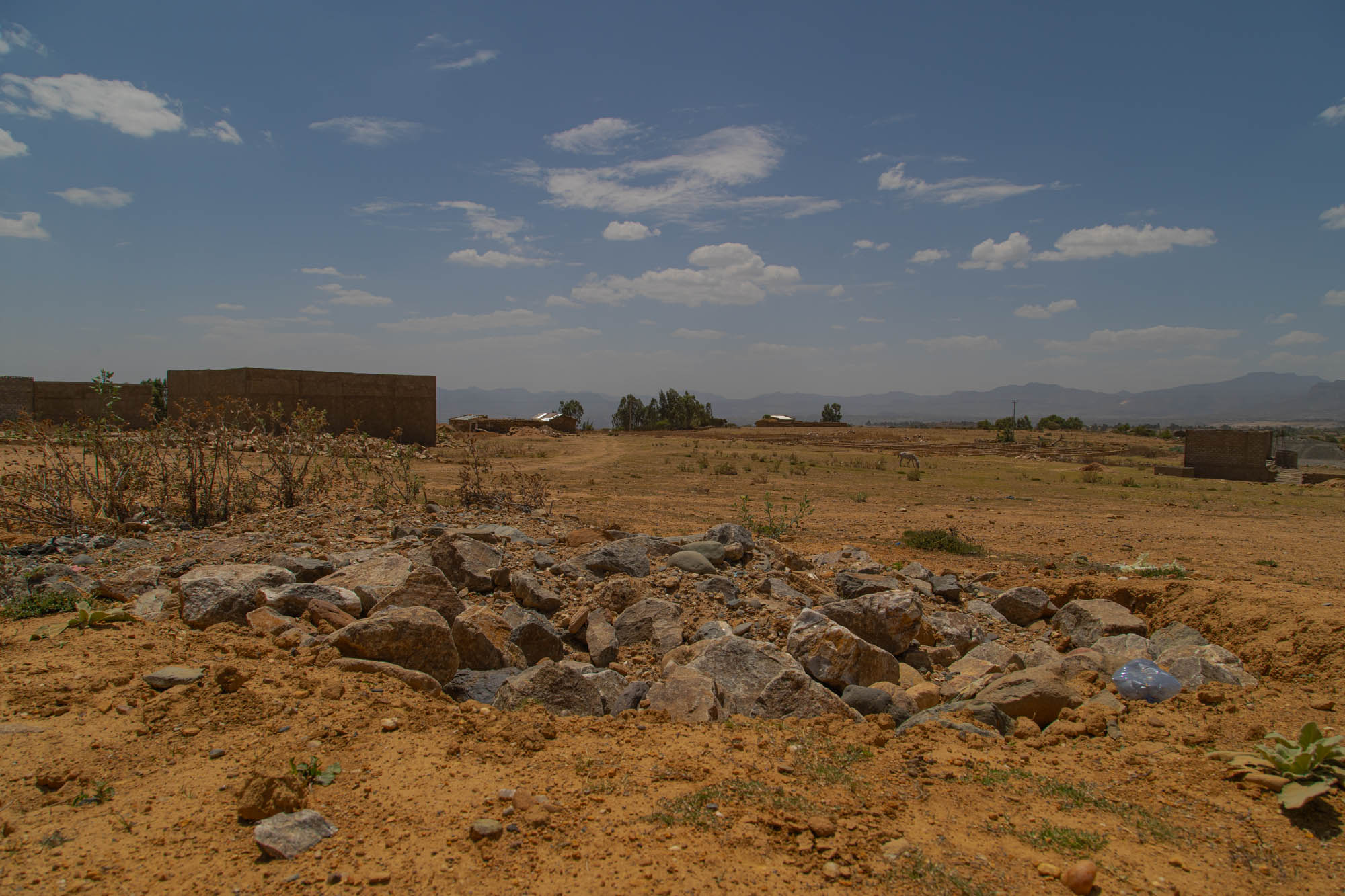
A mass grave of civilians killed as a result of the Tigray War

Relations between the federal government and the Tigray regional government deteriorated after the election, and on 4 November 2020, Abiy began a military offensive in the Tigray Region in response to attacks on army units stationed there, causing thousands of refugees to flee to neighbouring Sudan and triggering the Tigray War. More than 600 civilians were killed in a massacre in the town of Mai Kadra on 9 November 2020. In April 2021, Eritrea confirmed its troops are fighting in Ethiopia. As of March 2022, as many as 500,000 people had died as a result of violence and famine in the Tigray War, with other reported estimates reaching numbers as high as 700,000–800,000 by the end of 2022. After a number of peace and mediation proposals in the intervening years, Ethiopia and the Tigrayan rebel forces agreed to a cessation of hostilities on 2 November 2022; as Eritrea was not a party to the agreement, however, their status remained unclear.

== Federal constitution ==
Following the 1991 downfall of the Derg/PDRE, Ethiopia was ruled by a transitional government until 1995. This marks the beginning of the development of the federal constitution.

The Tigrean People's Liberation Front (TPLF) and Eritrean People's Liberation Front (EPLF) were responsible for the victory over the PDRE, although the victory was ascribed to the Ethiopian People's Revolutionary Democratic Front (EPRDF) for political reasons. The EPLF were fighting for Eritrean independence and resorted to governance of that region, leaving the TPLF in effective control of the rest of Ethiopia. But the TPLF represented an ethnic minority of less than 10% of the country. The creation of the Ethiopian People's Revolutionary Democratic Front (EPRDF), involving other ethnic parties, was a means of at least appearing to overcome that difficulty. However, the TPLF itself created ethnicity-centered parties to join the EPRDF coalition, in effect under its control. In doing this, and pushing for the division of the country into ethnic regions, it was promoting the likelihood that the EPRDF would become politically dominant in a way that was recognizable from Soviet-era political strategy.

The EPRDF convened the July 1991 Peace and Democracy conference, inviting 25 political organizations. This conference approved the 1948 Universal Declaration of Human Rights (UDHR), asserting multi-party democracy, freedom of association and speech. It granted Eritrean secession from Ethiopia and ethnic secession from the territory. Following the conference, the Transitional Government of Ethiopia (TGE) was established with an unelected legislative body called the Council of Representatives (CoR). The CoR had 87 seats with 33 political organizations. The EPRDF was allocated 32 of 87 delegates, giving it control; the Oromo Liberation Front had 12 and the rest were divided up among 20 smaller parties.

In January 1992, the CoR divided the country into ethnolinguistic regions. Political disagreement emerged as parties sought to establish control in regions before the 1992 regional elections. Although the civil war was avoided, several major parties withdrew in protest from the 1992 election, which EPRDF coalition parties won with 1108 of 1147 seats. Similar withdrawals were made from the 1994 elections to a Constituent Assembly to reform the constitution, which the EPRDF won with 484 of 547 seats. The Constituent Assembly thus adopted the constitution on December 8, 1994, with elements of a charter recognizing self-determination, secession, democratic and human rights, and forming nine regions. Altogether, this controversial and under-contested process produced a "constitutional structure [that] cemented ethnicity as the definitive issue in Ethiopian politics." The constitution was promulgated by the Constitution of the Federal Democratic Republic of Ethiopia Proclamation No. 1/1995 which entered into force on 21 August 1995.

Although the original constitution formed nine regions, Article 39, Section 1 of the constitution states: "Every nation, nationality and people have an unconditional right to self-determination including the right to secession." Each ethnic territory was thus given a right to secede. The Sidama Region was formed on 18 June 2020 from the Southern Nations, Nationalities, and Peoples' Region (SNNPR) after a 98.52% vote in favour of increased autonomy, in the 2019 Sidama referendum; South West Ethiopia was split off from the SNNPR on 23 November 2021 after the 2021 South West Region referendum; and the South Ethiopia Region was split from the SNNPR after the 2023 South Ethiopia Region referendum.

The federation, therefore, consists of 12 ethno-linguistically defined regional states and two chartered cities: Afar; Amhara, Benishangul-Gumuz; Central Ethiopia; Gambela; Harari; Oromia; Somali; Tigray; Sidama; South Ethiopia; and South West Ethiopia. Addis Ababa, the country's capital, and Dire Dawa are chartered cities.

This provision of rights to self-determination and secession was welcomed by the federally-minded but not by supporters of Ethiopian nationalism and its diaspora, especially the previously dominant Amhara, who feared both the decentralization of government and the possible rise of ethnic tension. Statehood permits control, and secession and autonomy are rights that are held against the state. In multi-ethnic states, tension between state and ethnic regions is common, and far from unique to Ethiopia in the wider African context. The Ethiopian federal constitution recognizes such realities. However, there continue to be major conflicts with ethnic roots.

== Political developments under federal constitution ==
After the 1995 general election, Meles Zenawi, chairman of the Tigray People's Liberation Front (TPLF), was appointed prime minister by the ruling EPRDF coalition. His government reversed the communist policies of the Derg/PDRE and progressively encouraged the privatization of government companies, farms, lands, and investments.

This socioeconomic and partial political liberalization within a federalist system, combined with a return of considerable foreign investment, led to significant economic growth. Subsequent administrations maintained and expanded these policies, and between 1999 and 2019 real GDP per person rose at an average annual rate of 9.3%. Upon Meles's death in 2012, his deputy, Hailemariam Desalegn, assumed power, confirmed by elections in 2015. Under the leadership of Hailemariam, the TPLF and EPRDF maintained the same policies until 2018, earning Ethiopia the status of the fastest-growing economy in Africa.

These economic outcomes were achieved in part through authoritarianism, The Economist opined in 2013 that the "country has a state-backed policy of boosting the economy and alleviating poverty, carried out by officials with near-dictatorial powers."

While the EPRDF administrations introduced many social reforms, there was still a notable degree of political and media suppression, coupled with allegations of election meddling in 2005 and opposition suppression in 2015. The TPLF, drawn from only 6% of the population, was seen as unduly favourable to Tigrayans and was resented by the majority of Oromos (34%) and Amhara (27%). There were also ethnic clashes involving Ethiopian Somalis (6%). Ethiopia continued to be affected by inter-ethnic divisions, resulting in an escalation of political instability, perceived deficiencies in civil administration, and authoritarianism. The constitutional provisions for secession were suppressed by violence. A state of emergency was imposed in October 2016 following protests. After three years of growing discontent and clashes, Oromos and Amhara factions within the EPRDF forced out TPLF's Hailemariam in 2018. He was eventually replaced by Abiy Ahmed.

Abiy is the first Oromo leader in Ethiopia (whose roles had been dominated by Amhara since imperial times). He was an elected member of the Ethiopian parliament, and a member of the Oromo Democratic Party (ODP), one of the then four coalition parties of the EPRDF. He dissolved the EPRDF in 2019 and formed and led the Prosperity Party.

The Prosperity Party is a pan-ethnic merger of former EPRDF and several other parties. It is, in a different way, just as concerned about the implications of ethnic federalism as was the EPRDF. But Abiy was initially more conciliatory. His administration ended the 20-year post-war territorial stalemate between Ethiopia and Eritrea, for which he won the 2019 Nobel Peace Prize. No longer under the threat of violent suppression, ethnic separatists took to heart. The Sidama Region and South West Ethiopia split from the Southern Nations, Nationalities, and Peoples' Region, in referendums of 2019 and 2021, respectively.

In losing control of the EPRDF, however, the TPLF regarded the Prosperity Party as illegitimate and refused to participate in it. In June 2020, Abiy and the National Election Board of Ethiopia postponed scheduled parliamentary elections due to the COVID-19 pandemic. This move prompted criticism, especially from the opposition over the constitutional legitimacy of the delay. The TPLF held its regional election that the Ethiopian government declared illegitimate, escalating simmering tension into the Tigray War.

The Prosperity Party won the rescheduled 2021 Ethiopian Election, returning Abiy as prime minister.

== Major conflicts ==
=== Ogaden insurgency ===
Ethnic and tribal conflict within the Somali Region occurred shortly after its formation in 1992. In May 1991, a pan-Islamist Al-Ittihad al-Islam (Islamic Unity) was established to consolidate Somalis with the empire in the Ogaden region. Al-Ittihad was accused by the government of orchestrating bombing attacks between 1996 and 1997. Following this, the Ethiopian military crossed southern Somalia and successfully neutralized the wing. The Ogaden National Liberation Front began operating in the region following a naming dispute, what they called "Ogaadeenia", established in the Gulf state in March 1984. After the Ogaden War and subsequent Ethiopian-Somalia War terminated in the Djibouti agreement in 1988, the Derg-sponsored Western Somali Liberation Front (WSLF) mediated the stalemate intermittently. Since 1991, OLF has rendered it the dominant political party and the largest within the interim Somali regional assembly after the December 1992 elections. In the assembly held in the same year, controversial issues were raised, including a failed proposition of Dire Dawa to be the capital of the Region.

The ONLF preferred Gode despite non-Ogaden clans opposing the move, who worked for Jijiga to make a new capital. In 1994, Somali money was transferred to Jijiga due to security issues between the ONLF and EPRDF. The first Somali Region president was Abdullahi Mohammed Sa'adi from the ONLF. In July 1993, the government sacked the new president over alleged fund misuse, eventually creating a setback to EPRDF–ONLF relations and instability in the Region. As of 2002, eight presidents have lost their positions. In May 1994, ONLF held a secessionist referendum, although EPRDF determined declining the referendum as an "illegal resolution". Similarly, numerous pro-rebel insurgency organizations thrived, such as the Democratic Unity Party, the Ethiopian Somali Democratic Movement, and the Democratic Action.

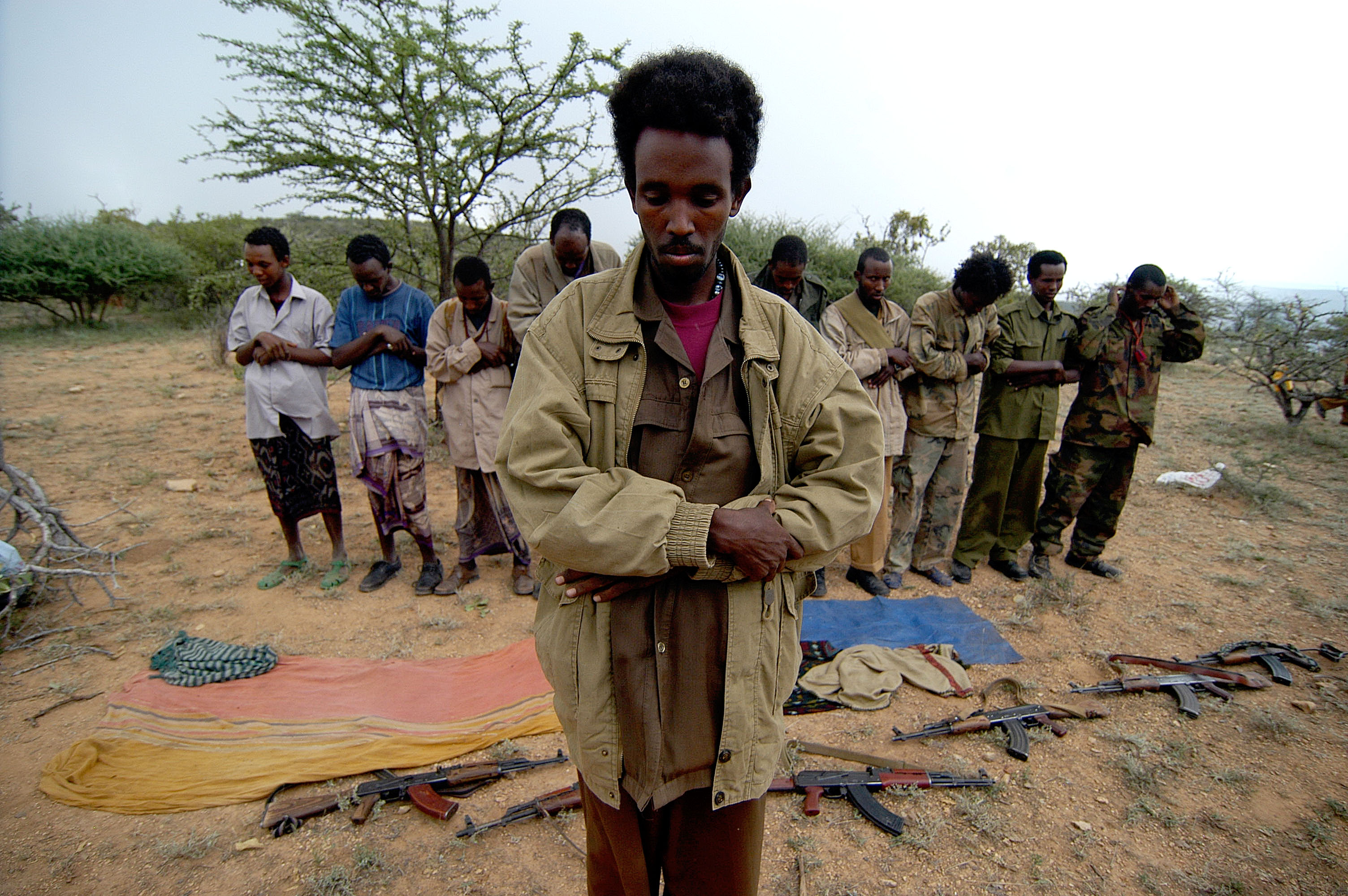
ONLF rebels in 2006

The ONLF insurgency was officially launched on 22 February 1994 after government troops killed 81 people in an ONLF rally in Wardheer (Werder). In response, ONLF rebels killed two and four government soldiers in Har Weyne on 27 April 2004 and 8 April 2004, respectively. On 16 June 2004, the government killed ten civilians in a truck travelling between Kebri Dahar and Wardheer. On 1 October, the government clashed with ONLF rebels in the Ogaden region, which left 17 government soldiers dead. Sporadic government raids and rebel insurgency ensued between 2004 and 2010, when representatives of the Ethiopian government and the ONLF faction signed a peace agreement on 13 October 2010. Again the government reinstated the campaign against ONLF on 23–25 November 2010 and continued for more than a couple of years. Negotiations were attempted in the first round in Nairobi on 6–7 September 2012, with the delegation of government's Defense Minister Siraj Fegessa and ONLF's Admiral Mohamed Omar Osman in that October. The process continued on 25 December in Addis Ababa, inviting ONLF's Abdinur Abdulaye Farah. On 26 January 2014, two negotiators from the splinter of ONLF, Painito Bera Ng'ang'ai and James Ngaparini, were kidnapped by Kenyan police before turning to the Ethiopian government.

During the administration of Prime Minister Abiy Ahmed, the ONLF ultimately declared a ceasefire on 12 August 2018 after a call by Abiy. On 22 October 2018, Eritrea hosted the final peace treaty of the Ethiopian government and ONLF concerning leaders from Foreign Affairs Minister Workneh Gebeyehu and Admiral Mohammed Omar Osman.

=== Oromo Liberation Front and Oromo Liberation Army ===
Flag of the Oromo Liberation Front (OLF)

The Oromo Liberation Front insurgency traces back to its founding in 1973 in response to the perceived deficient rule of Haile Selassie and the Derg mass arrests in a particular area of Galamso, Badessa, Mechara, Bike, Balbaleti. On the other hand, the OLF was established with the objective of self-determination of the Oromo people: "realization of the national self-determination of the Oromo people" and "believes the Oromo people are still being denied their fundamental rights by Ethiopian colonialism", according to their website.

During the struggle against the Derg military government, the OLF was closely involved in an alliance with spearhead political groups like the Tigray People's Liberation Front (TPLF) and the Eritrean People's Liberation Front (EPLF), both of whom formed a coalition party named the Ethiopian People's Revolutionary Democratic Front in 1988. In June 1992, the OLF withdrew from the EPRDF coalition due to fear of Tigrayan hegemony, triggering an Oromo-led insurgency which left thousands deported to Kenya and Somalia. The relations between Eritrea and Ethiopia worsened by 1993 when Ethiopia accused Eritrea of supplying arms to OLF insurgents. In May and June of that year, the OLF sent troops backed by tanks to Somalia. Similarly, the Al-Ittihad al-Islam took raids on the border of southern Ethiopia, and the government failed to access the Ethio-Kenyan border where OLF insurgents were believed to operate there. In 1995, the government arrested 280 members of the OLF accused of rebellion in the town of Zeway.

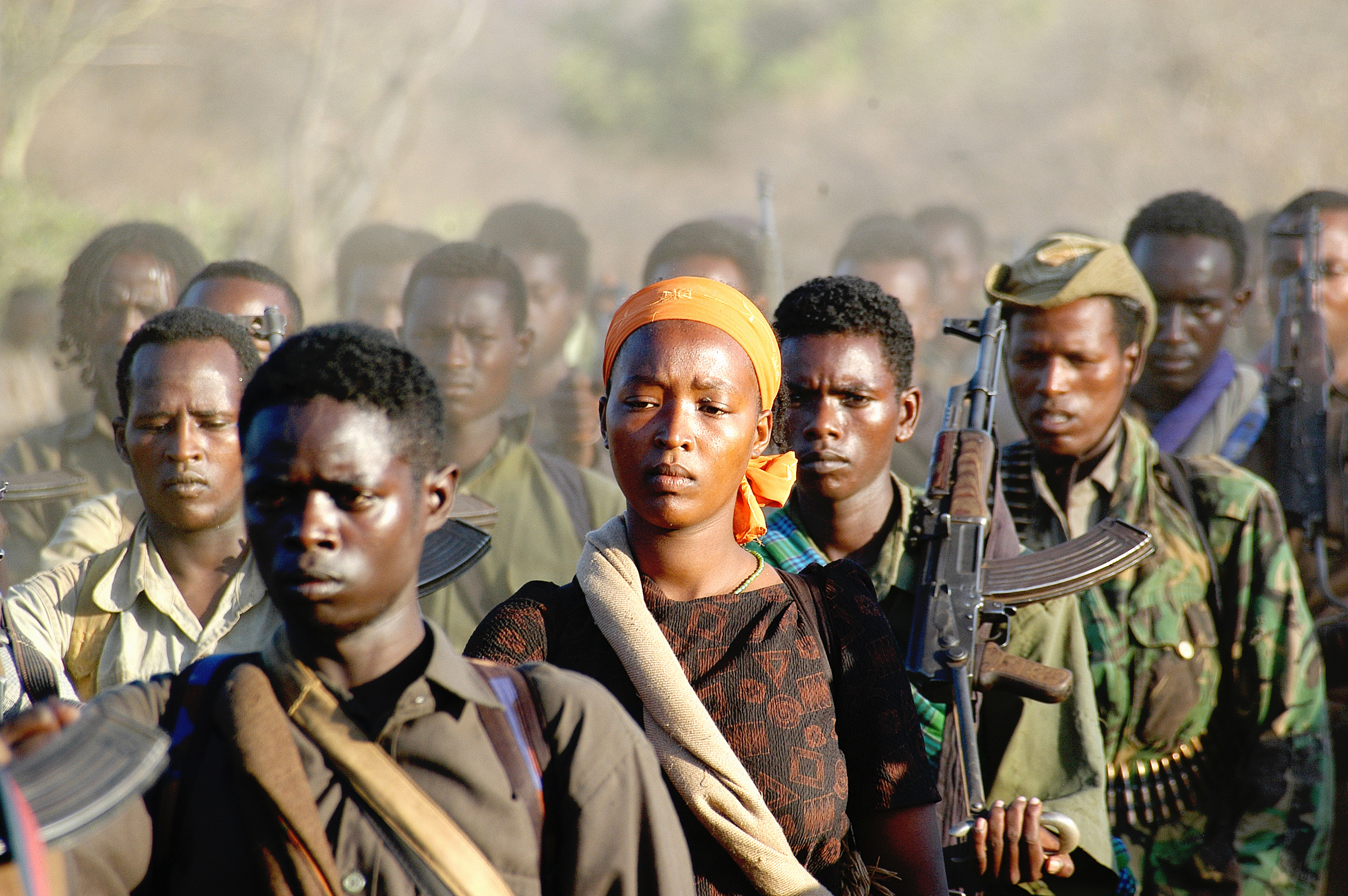
Armed OLF fighters retreating to Kenya, 3 February 2006

After its chairman Galassa Dilbo resigned in 2003, OLF members met with Eritrea in Asmara in December 2004, and Dawud Ibsa Ayana succeeded in the chairman position. Between 2001 and 2007, the OLF was involved in a territorial stalemate, where the situation fell in the foundation of Ethiopian–Eritrean border conflict. In the Bergen meeting, several OLF committee members reportedly called for participation in the 2005 general election regarding the group's isolation, a big issue ravaging OLF leaderless. On 15 September 2006, veteran Ethiopian Army commanders Brigadier General Hailu Gonfa and Gemechu Ayana joined OLF after serving for TPLF.

In January 2005, sixteen Eritrean political parties met in Khartoum, Sudan, to establish the Eritrean Democratic Alliance (EDA) with Ethiopian support. In May 2006, four opposition parties turned to the insurgency. They formed the Alliance for Freedom and Democracy (AFD), aiming for a peaceful, nonviolent struggle against the government, despite pledged rebellion against any authority. The prominent members of the coalition had their headquarters in Asmara, Eritrea.

In August 2011, the government detained Bekele Gerba, an Oromo activist, in alleged connection with the OLF and Olbana Lelisa. Agence France-Presse amplified the government statement quoting, "These people were arrested because the police had found evidence that had linked them with clandestine activities carried out by the OLF". Paris-based newspaper The Sudan Tribune released a statement that the Ethiopian Federal Higher Court convicted the two people for having links to the OLF by recruiting students to the organization and using the membership. In 2010, the UN Committee Against Torture accused the government of allegedly torturing supporters of insurgent groups like the OLF. On 27 June 2014, the OLF announced the formation of two organizations on their websites, also known as the "OLF National Council" and the "OLF Transitional Authority", and agreed to combine military and leadership structure.

A successful peace process was held in Asmara during Abiy Ahmed's tenure on 7 August 2018, signing the Reconciliation Agreement. It was signed between the Oromia Region President Lemma Megersa and his OLF counterpart Dawud Ibsa Ayana. According to Eritrean information minister Yemane Gebremeskel, the agreement stated, "The OLF will conduct its political activities in Ethiopia through peaceful means". Meanwhile, its wing, the Oromo Liberation Army, failed to reach the peace agreement, seeing "no room for a peaceful political resolution" and continued a separate movement aside from the OLF.

On 2 November 2020, 54 people (mostly Amhara women, children and older adults) were killed in the Gawa Qanqa by attackers declaring themselves under the OLA after the Ethiopian National Defense Force withdrew from the area without explanation. The OLA denied any responsibility. The Ethiopian Human Rights Commission (EHRC) reported that 210 people were killed in Oromia Region's Gida–Kirimu on 18 August 2021. The state-affiliated independent commission said that the witness identified shooters related to the OLA after the security forces withdrew from the area.

The rebel group began operating in Western Oromia during the Tigray War. Amnesty International reported that the OLA repeatedly committed human rights abuse targeting mostly Amhara minorities using massacres, extrajudicial killings of captives and sexual violence targeting women and girls. On 1 May 2021, Ethiopia formally approved the TPLF and the OLA as designated terrorist organizations. On 5 November 2021, the OLA and eight rebel political organizations formed the United Front of Ethiopian Federalist and Cofederalist Forces to "dismantle Abiy's government by force or by negotiation, and then form a transitional authority".

=== Afar–Somali clashes ===
The Afar–Somali clashes began in 2014 when ethnic Somalis claimed regions, including the Awash River and highway and railway conjunctions between Addis Ababa and Djibouti, which provided significant resources to them. Another issue was disputed special kebeles inhabited by Somali's Issa clan, such as Adaytu in the Mille woreda, Undufo in the Gewane woreda, and Gedamaytu in the Amibara woreda. In 2014, the federal government delimited the boundary between the two regions, losing three villages in the Somali Region to the Afar Region.

Further violence escalated on 27 October 2020, killing 27 people, according to the Ethiopian government. On 27 July 2021, the Somali Region government said Afar militias looted the town of Gedamaytu, also known as Gabraiisa, with undisclosed casualties. An estimated 300 Somalis were killed in the clash that began on 24 July, where their bodies were reportedly scattered on the roads of Garbe Isse.

=== Oromo–Somali clashes ===
The Oromo–Somali clashes escalated after the failed resolution of demarcating the boundary between Oromia and Somali regions for decades. In 2004, a referendum was held with more than 420 kebeles being transferred to the Oromia Region, leaving the Somali minorities displaced. The Jarso population in the Somali Region also voted to join Oromia.

According to the 10th round (March–April) of the Displacement Tracking Matrix (DTM)1, at least 10,737,642 people were displaced as of mid-2018, with the majority of displacement occurring in the clash of Oromia and Somalia.

=== Civil conflict ===
Situation of Ethiopian civil conflict as of January 2022

In November 2020, simmering ethnic and political tensions and attacks on the Ethiopian National Defense Force (ENDF) Northern Command exploded into the Tigray War between the combined forces of the ENDF and the Eritrean Army against troops loyal to the TPLF. This ethnic party dominated the erstwhile ruling EPRDF coalition during a nearly thirty-year period marked by rapid development alongside increasing interethnic tension and those loyal to significant allied groups, such as the Oromo Liberation Army, currently in loose alignment with TPLF.

This conflict displaced up to 2 million people, continues unabated, and has spread into Amhara and Afar regions, as of September 2022, with repeated breakdowns of ceasefires, despite support for negotiations from the US and Kenyan governments. Both sides have large, heavily armed troop emplacements nearby, and trade and food blockades persist, creating widespread hunger, estimated to affect 4.8 million people, mainly Tigrayan.

== Economy ==
Historical GDP per capita growth from 1950 to 2018

Ethiopia has achieved economic growth of more than 7% in the past decade. During Meles Zenawi's administration, Ethiopia boosted the fastest economic growth in Africa in terms of GDP with double-digit economic growth for his last nine years, resuming seven years after his death when his party, the TPLF, continued the same policy. The rise of agricultural output led to 11% economic growth for the 2011–12 fiscal year that ended in June, though inflation elevated by 20% in July.

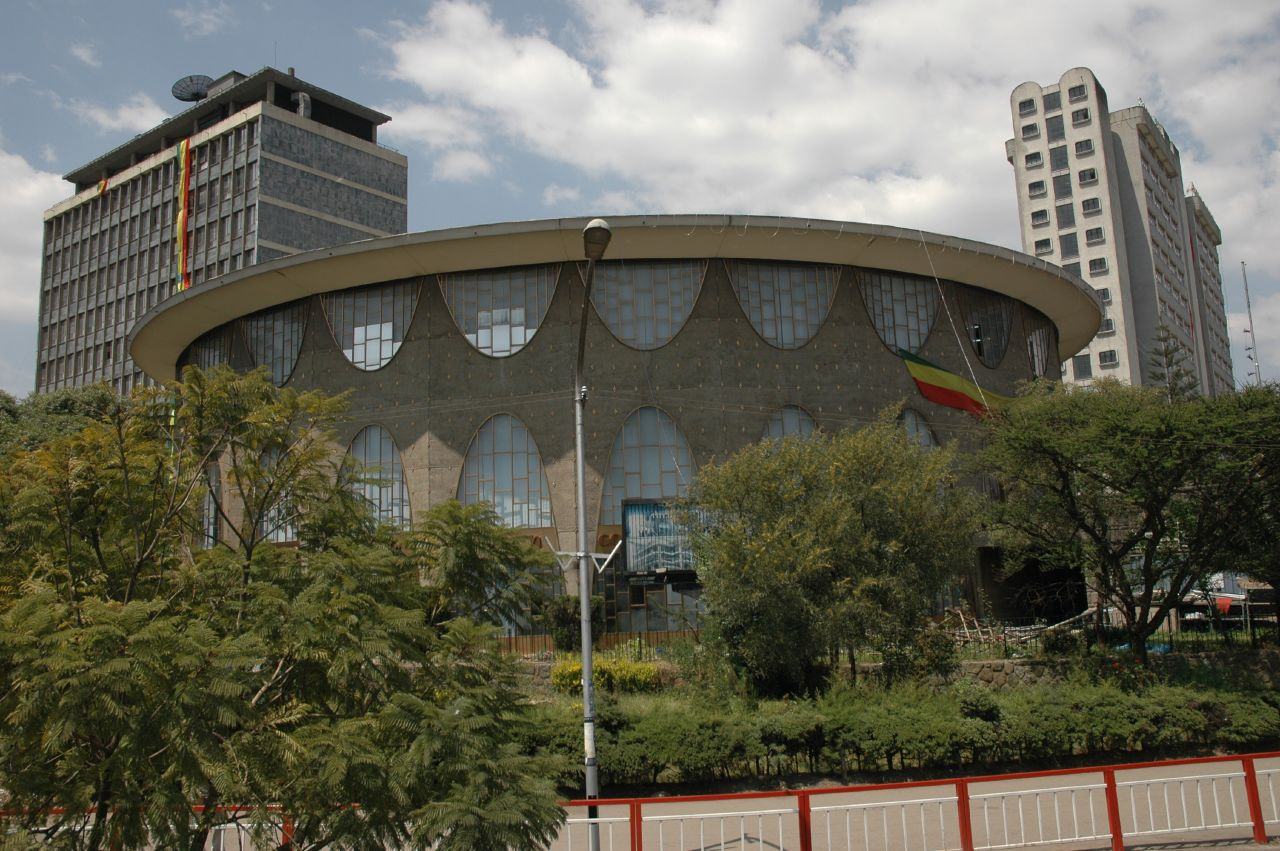
Commercial Bank of Ethiopia in 2007

In addition, the country maintained loans from foreign countries. Over the past years alone, USAID lent $675 million, and Britain's Department for International Development (DfID) lent an average of £331m a year until 2015. The Ethiopian economy in manufacturing grew from 4% (2010) to 6% (2018), which is still at a reduced level due to trade deficiency. Foreign currency may be acquired to strengthen foreign direct investment in labour-intensive manufacturing industries and industrial zones. Ethiopia actively invested in China, Turkey and India in primary sectors, including textiles, leather-making, and shoe-making, with cheap labour. The accessibility to rural areas often meets low productivity and has a comparative advantage. Ethiopia has a high debt, with 60% of its 2018 GDP and half of its external debt. The IMF warned of the increased risk of debt remaining stable. Acquisition of foreign currency dominated in the future includes (1) 22 domestic industrial zones that are currently underdeveloping, (2) gas development promoted by China in northeastern Ogaden and completion of gas pipelines linking to Djibouti, (3) transmittance from around three million Ethiopian diasporas, (4) electricity exports to Kenya, by which the Grand Ethiopian Renaissance Dam is expected to deliver adequate to neighboring countries and (5) privatization of state-owned enterprises such as Ethio Telecom and Ethiopian Airlines.

In September 2019, Prime Minister Abiy Ahmed announced the launch of the Homegrown Economic Reform Agenda (HERA), a program designated to advance the GTP with economic activity shifts from agriculture to industry. HERA also expected to suspend the country's low middle-income rate until 2030, after initially aiming for 2025 under GTP. Also, the government announced the shortage of foreign currency and vowed to conduct reforms within three years targeting increased productivity. Contrary, the designation still needs to be determined whether further measures should be taken by HERA or the integration of GTP in the third phase in HERA.

== See also ==
- Ethiopian People's Revolutionary Democratic Front
- Transitional Government of Ethiopia
- 1995 Constitution of Ethiopia
- Ethnic discrimination in Ethiopia
