= Fuad Qalaf =

Somali-Swedish militant (born 1965)

Fu'aad Mohamed Shangole
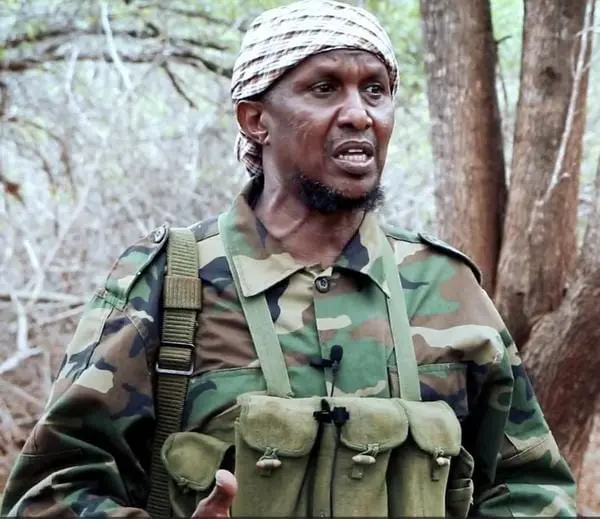
- Born: March 28, 1965 (age 61); Mogadishu, Somalia
- Known for: Official of Al-Shabaab

Fuad Mohamed Qalaf (Somali: Fu'aad Maxamed Khalaf, Arabic: فؤاد محمد خلف; born 28 March 1965), also known as Fuad Shangole, is a Somali-Swedish militant who is a senior member of Al-Shabaab.

Working as a cleric in Sweden during the 1990s and early 2000s, he returned to Somalia in 2004 and eventually became a senior figure within the Islamic Courts Union (ICU). Following the collapse of the ICU during the Ethiopian invasion of 2006 he fled Somalia but returned to become a top official within the Al-Shabaab Islamist militant group. Qalaf was the first senior Al-Shabaab leader to publicly criticize the group's leader Ahmed Abdi Godane. In 2012, the United States put out a bounty on Qalaf.

Presently he holds a seat on Al-Shabaab's Shura Council and is believed to head the group's operations in Puntland state. He helped lead al-Shabaab's invasion of Ethiopia during 2022.

== Biography ==
Born in Mogadishu, Qalaf came to Sweden as an asylum seeker in 1992 and later received Swedish citizenship. Qalaf comes from the Harti sub-clan of the wider Darod. He lived in Sweden for twelve years, most of the time preaching as an Imam at a mosque in the Rinkeby district in Stockholm (Swedish: Rinkebymoskén). As such, he worked to influence young Muslims about Jihad. Qalaf collected money towards financing the Islamic Courts Union (ICU) in Somalia as well as recruiting youth to both the ICU and later also to al-Shabaab. He was also reportedly openly sympathetic towards al-Qaeda. He was also a prolific lecturer at the Bellevue Mosque in Gothenburg.

In 2004, Qalaf returned to Somalia together with his family during the rise of the ICU. Following the ICU's capture of Mogadishu in mid-2006, Qalaf went on to join the Department of Education under the newly formed ICU-government. In this role, he had pushed to begin teaching students military tactics for the purpose of national defense. He opened training camps for youth during summer vacation from school. After the Ethiopian invasion of Somalia in December 2006 and the subsequent fall of the ICU-government, Qalaf and other ICU leaders fled the country. In April 2007, he was reported to be living in Kenya. Qalaf returned to Somalia again during 2007/2008 to be a prominent al-Shabaab militant leader.

In April 2010, Qalaf was designated a terrorist by the US government. Later that year he was the target of two assassination attempts. Hizbul Islam, another Islamist militant group then rivaling al-Shabaab, reportedly targeted him in a roadside bombing in February of that year. In May, he was targeted by unknown assailants in the Bakaara Market of Mogadishu. By the end of 2010, Qalaf became the first senior figure in the organization who publicly criticized the leader of al-Shabaab, Ahmed Godane, for having “hidden agendas,” after the al-Shabaab attacked Hizbul Islam forces.

Qalaf increasingly split with Godane due to attacks he carried out on Hizbul Islam while its leader, Hassan Dahir Aweys, was negotiating with Al-Shabaab. Godane opposed a Hizbul Islam/Al-Shabaab merger, while Qalaf supported it. By 2011, Qalaf had risen to become the leader of the group's operations in Puntland. That year he also publicly described suicide bombing as unlawful and began adopting a more conciliatory tone towards the TFG. He warned Al-Shabaab fighters to stop assassinating people 'on mere suspicion of working for the government' as it was a great sin. He later declared that Al-Shabaab would stop 'caning' people for perceived transgressions against sharia. During a speech in Mogadishu during January 2011, Qalaf stated that TFG would potentially be able to lead the country, in accordance with sharia (Islamic law), together with Al Shabab.

In June 2012, the United States government put out its first bounty on Qalaf, following which he put out a mocking statement declaring:

"Anyone who helps the mujahideen find the whereabouts of Obama and Hillary Clinton will be rewarded with ten camels for the information leading to Obama and ten hens and ten cocks for Hillary”

In May 2013, Fuad Qalaf confirmed that al Shabaab had killed American jihadist Omar Hammami (aka Abu Mansoor Al-Amriki) and several other foreign fighters in Bay region. In May 2014, Qalaf stated that al-Shabab fighters would carry out jihad, or holy war, in Kenya and Uganda "and afterward, with God's will, to America."

In 2021, the United States government put a $6 million dollar bounty for information that could lead to Qalafs capture. Following al-Shabaab's 2022 invasion into Ethiopia, Major General Tesfaye Ayalew of the Ethiopian National Defence Force (ENDF) claimed to have killed Qalaf in an airstrike on 29 July 2022. On 3 August, Al Shabaab released a voice recording of Qalaf, who denied Ethiopian forces killed him on July 29. He further stated that al Shabaab would continue to attack the Somali Regional Liyu Police.

== See also ==
- Ali Mohamed Rage
- Mukthar Robow
