= Dacawalay conflict =

Military conflict in the Hawd region of Ethiopia

Da'awalay Conflict
- Part of Ethiopian civil conflict
Date	December 2024
Location	Da'awalay, Harshin district Haud, Ethiopia
Result	Ethiopian national military deployed to area to re-establish security
Territorial changes	Liyu Police forces temporarily withdraw from the Haud Region

Belligerents
Local Isaaq militia Supported by: Somaliland	Ethiopia: Somali Region

Commanders and leaders
Unknown	Mustafa Mohammed Omar; Mohamed Geddi †

Strength
Armed residents	Liyu Police units

Casualties and losses
~300 civilians killed Unknown number of wounded	283 troops killed
- Several abductions of elders Thousands displaced, international organizations reaction.

Da'awalay Conflict (also spelled Dacawalay or Da'awaley) was a conflict, mass killing and village-level assault that took place on and around 25 December 2024 in the town of Da'awaley in the Harshin District, Somali Regional State, Ethiopia. The attack, reported by some sources as having been carried out by Ethiopian regional state security units commonly known as the Liyu Police and Somali militias, targeted members of the Isaaq clan and local nomadic communities. Multiple local, regional and international sources reported large numbers of civilian deaths, abductions of elders who were sent as mediators, village burnings, and the displacement of thousands of people.

== Background ==
According to Somaliland-based researcher and Gollis University lecturer Gulaid Yusuf Idaan, the Somali Region of Ethiopia (interchangeably called Ogaden) has a long history of inter-clan tensions and recurring violence. In the months and years leading up to December 2024 there were multiple reports of clashes in parts of Ethiopia's Somali Region involving rival clan militias and regional security forces; observers and analysts described a pattern of increasing militarization, alleged state-facilitated campaigns against particular communities and breakdowns in local dispute-resolution mechanisms.

Idaan additionally highlights the clashing ideological currents and power structures between different Somali clans in the Somali Regional State as factors for recurring conflict. The Ogaden Clan mostly support a "Greater Somalia" irredentism that aspires to unite the Ethiopian region with the sovereign state of Somalia (an idea known as "Darod irridentism" due to the presence of the large ethnic Somali Darod clan in the region). In contrast, the Isaaq clan opposes irredentism and prefers the status quo, leading to hostility with the Ogaden. Idaan also asserts that the Ethiopian national government's imposition of ethnic federalism in the 1990s further entrenched clan rivalries, and in practice empowered the Ogaden at the expense of the Isaaq. Lastly, Idaan maintains that the Ethiopian Somalia Region government led by President Mustafe Cagjar has weaponised state power to harm the Isaaq community and centralised authority exclusively within the Ogaden clan.

== Attack ==
Contemporary reporting and an analysis several days after the event by Idaan provided evidence suggesting a coordinated assault by Liyu Police detachments on Dacawalay and neighbouring hamlets. The assault reportedly began early in the morning, included house-to-house operations, and targeted both mediators and ordinary civilians. Witnesses reported shootings, abductions, deliberate arson, and looting. Several reports claim that video material and social-media posts circulated by perpetrators (or supporters) amplified the impact of the attack and contributed to terror among survivors.

The region's Liyu units — operating as regional special force with 5,000 members — were accused by local actors and human rights observers of operating along clan lines and of committing abuses during security operations. Local accounts and subsequent investigations report that traditional Isaaq elders and mediators were invited to the Dacawalay area to negotiate a local grazing dispute with Ogaden livestock herders and to mediate between clan elements. According to several independent and community sources, about 60 elders were ambushed by security forces, as they attempted to mediate the dispute, and later were reported to appear hours at a "carefully staged media event" by the Somali region abductors in the state capital Jigjiga. Reports also describe a pre-attack communications blackout and subsequent use of force that included burning homes and summary killings.

Ethiopian regional officials, on the contrary, maintained that the Liyu itself was attacked by armed groups aiming to incite conflict between Ethiopia and Somaliland. They claimed to have dispatched a three-man regional police team led by the area's security chief Mohammaed Gedi to resolve local clashes over grazing rights, only to be ambushed by these armed elements. Gedi and a deputy were said to be killed, while reinforcements sent to the area battled the militants for several days, losing no less than 30 police officers and capturing six members of the attackers. The authorities claimed that the attackers were equipped equipped with mortars, heavy machine guns (which they allegedly positioned on commandeered provincial administration vehicles) and anti-aircraft missiles. The regional officials maintained that the captured attackers admitted to being members of the Somaliland Defense Force operating in civilian disguise.

Reported death tolls varied across sources. Local community tallies and some Somaliland statements reported that approximately 135 members of the Isaaq community were killed in the attack; other outlets reported dozens to several dozen fatalities. The Addis Ababa-based The Reporter cited unnamed government sources reporting on more than 200 dead, while an independent researcher quoted a death toll as high as 300. In addition to those killed, many civilians were injured, elders and mediators were detained or disappeared, and thousands were displaced to neighbouring areas or across the border into Somaliland. Several sources document mass graves and hurried burials in the aftermath of the assault. Because of the communications blackout and restricted access for independent investigators immediately after the event, precise casualty verification was difficult to obtain.

== Aftermath ==
The attack provoked immediate local and cross-border condemnation, the flight of displaced persons (including to Somaliland), and heightened tensions along the Ethiopia–Somaliland border. Authorities in Somaliland issued statements condemning the actions of the Somali Region's security forces and calling for accountability; Somaliland officials also reported detentions and deaths among elders who had gone to mediate. Local clinics reported receiving many wounded, while sources documented mass burials and a surge in internally displaced persons. Humanitarian access was constrained in the immediate aftermath due to security concerns and the communications blackout.

Ethiopian and Somaliland government officials convened in the Ethiopian Somali state capital Jigjiga on 26 December in a bid to de-escalate tensions, at a meeting chaired by Somali region president Hussein Hashi. The Ethiopian national government delegation was led by Federal Police Commissioner General Demelash Gebremichael, who was said to present evidence of Somaliland military involvement in the clashes and demanded that the Somalian army withdraw from the border area. The Ethiopian National Defense Force (ENDF) was reportedly deployed to the Harshin to re-assert order and drive away the attackers.

== Reactions ==
=== Somaliland government ===
The government of Somaliland publicly condemned the assault and characterized it as a massacre of Isaaq communities by Somali Region forces. Somaliland's Minister of Internal Security, Abdalle Maxamed Carab (alternatively spelled as "Mohamed Arab") declared that the attack by these forces "violate human rights and governance principles", while alleging that traditional elders from Somaliland had been abducted and/or killed while attempting to mediate. Somaliland President Abdirahman Abdillahi Irro condemned the violence and stressed the need for accountability, while attending the funerals of attack victims.

=== Regional and diaspora responses ===
Somali regional commentators and a number of Somaliland- and diaspora-based media published eyewitness accounts and op-eds condemning the killings and urging international human-rights organisations to investigate. An opinion piece by Abdirisaq Hassan appealed to Amnesty International to demand accountability from the Somali region authorities on account of reports of human rights abuses. The piece described the Dacawalay attack as part of a broader pattern of systematic abuses linked to clan politics in the Somali Region of Ethiopia.

=== Local civil society ===
At the time of immediate reporting, major international media coverage and official investigations were limited; several smaller human-rights groups and fact-finding teams from diaspora and regional NGOs compiled reports and called for independent investigation. One such fact-finding mission from the Inclusive and Integrated Development Organization (IIDO), a local Somaliland-based NGO, visited the affect areas day after the attack and accused the Liyu Police force and its commander, the president of the Somali state government Mustafe Cagjar, as being culpable for the violence. An op-ed by Abdirisaq Hassan in the Hargeisa-based Safaxi Media group urged Amnesty International and other global human rights groups to hold the Ethiopian Somalia region authorities accountable for the attack, while Somaliland activists circulated a petition on Change.org to the International Court of Justice urging it to investigate the role of Cagjar's government.

=== Ethiopian Somali Regional State government ===
Ethiopia's Somali Regional State government issued a statement that blamed Somaliland government elements for involvement in the attack, while asserting that the Liyu Police intervened in the attack to counter "armed groups attempting to disrupt peace and security in the region." A government press release maintained that Liyu arrived at the urging of community elders and clan leaders, and came under attack by the armed groups. The statement further blamed the Somaliland Minister of Security (the Ministry of Interior) for remarks that it said inflamed, rather than de-escalated, the situation.

Unnamed Somali Regional State security officials suggested to The Reporter that outside parties may have been involved in the attacks, with the aim of sabotaging Somaliland-Ethiopia relations. Accusations were leveled at former Somaliland President Muse Bihi, who, after having lost the 2024 presidential election earlier that year was said to have sought to impede the new government's foreign policy. Another possibility raised was that rogue Somaliland officials sought disrupt Ethiopian reproachment with Somalia, following the signing of the Ankara Declaration several weeks earlier. Officials also suggested that the Somalia-based terrorist group Al-Shabaab had a role in supplying heavy weaponry, given that local militia were thought to lack such arms that were used in the attack and that the terror group has sought to destabilise Ethiopia.

== See also ==
- Isaaq
- Ogaden (clan)
- Liyu Police
- Ethnic violence in Ethiopia
