= Afar–Somali clashes =

2020s territorial dispute between the Afar and Somali Regions of Ethiopia

Date	28 October 2020 – 18 April 2024
Location	Border between Afar Region and Somali Region

Belligerents
Somali Region	Afar Region

Commanders and leaders
Mustafa Mohammed Omar (Cagjar)	(Afar Region) Awol Arba Unde

Units involved
Liyu Police	Afar Militia

Casualties and losses
- 448+

The Afar–Somali clashes were territorial conflicts between the Afar and Somali Regions of Ethiopia. The current conflict which began in 2014, is centered around three special Kebeles inhabited by ethnic Somalis from the Issa Clan. These three special Kebeles include the Adaytu (Afar: Qadaytu, Somali: Cadayto) in Mille woreda, Undufo (Afar: Qundafaqo, Somali: Cundhufo) in Gewane woreda, and Gedamaytu (Afar: Gadamaytu, Somali: Garba-Ciise) in Amibara Woreda.

== Background ==
In 2014, the federal government, headed by the Ethiopian People’s Revolutionary Democratic Front (EPRDF) redrew the boundary between the two regions. As a result, the Somali Region lost three villages to the Afar Region. Since then they have been trying to get the villages back under their control.

== Clashes ==
According to Crisis Group since the conflicts began between the groups dozens of lives have been claimed. In October 2020, 27 people were killed. On 2 April 2021, 100 cattle herders were reportedly shot dead.

On 24 July 2021, clashes erupted in the town of Garbaiisa. The clashes, killing 300, were followed by massive protests in the Somali region, with roadblocks put on the only road out of the settlement, and the partial destruction of the Ethio-Djibouti Railways, where 95% of Ethiopia's maritime trade goes through. The conflict spilled over to Djibouti itself, where Afars and Somalis clashed in the Balbala suburb of Djibouti city. As a result, on 1 August the American embassy in Djibouti issued a demonstration alert warning of riots in Djibouti city's Balbala and Arhiba areas.

On 15 May 2022, both regions agreed to withdraw their forces from the disputed territory and support the return of displaced people. However, conflict flared up again on 9 November the same year, where fighting between local militias killed at least 18 people and injured at least 28 others in Dheymeed woreda, Sitti Zone.

Somali Region protesters blocked the Ethio-Djibouti Railways on 27 March 2023, believing that the Ethiopian National Defense Force (ENDF) "was implicitly supporting" the Afar Region in the border dispute. Local officials eventually convinced the protesters to unblock the road, but alleged that shortly afterward, the ENDF "suddenly opened fire" and killed 3 of the protesters, while wounding another 6. Days later, on 30 March, there were reports that Afar and Somali militia groups clashed around areas surrounding the road.

In March 2024, the Ethiopian Islamic Affairs Supreme Council initiated another round of peace talks, which led to a ceasefire agreement on 18 April 2024. The Council asked that the regional governments of both Somali and Afar regions fulfill their responsibilities in sustaining the ceasefire.

A high-level meeting convened by the Ethiopian National Committee, established to address the conflict between Somali and Afar, was held on 13 September 2024. The gathering was attended by Temesgen Tiruneh, Deputy Prime Minister, Binalf Andualem, Minister of Peace, the presidents of both regions, and representatives from federal and regional security agencies. Awol Arba Unde, president of the Afar region, and Mustafa Mohammed Omar (Cagjar), president of the Somali region, stated that high-ranking officials from both regions and the federal government have held discussions aimed at identifying the root causes of the conflicts and developing collaborative solutions. "The full implementation of the objectives outlined by the National Committee has been largely successful, including the cessation of conflict, prevention of civilian casualties, and the deployment of federal security forces in peaceful areas," Binalf Andualem, Minister of Peace, noted during the meeting held yesterday. "This has allowed the local population to experience a return to normalcy and hope for a more peaceful future."

== See also ==
- Afar Region
- Somali Region
