= Tefera Mamo =

Ethiopian military officer

Brigadier General Tefera Mamo
- ተፈራ ማሞ
- Born: Lalibela, North Wollo, Ethiopia
- Military career
- Allegiance: ENDF
- Branch: Ethiopian Ground Forces
- Service years: 1980s–present
- Unit: Amhara Regional Special Force
- Conflicts: Ethiopian Civil War; Tigray War; War in Amhara

Brigadier General Tefera Mamo (Amharic: ተፈራ ማሞ) is an Ethiopian military officer who was subjected to multiple imprisonments during the EPRDF and then the Prosperity Party regime.

Tefera has served the Ethiopian army from the Ethiopian Civil War, and became vocal supporter of Amhara people rights due to their prejudice in the Ethiopian politics. After prime minister Abiy Ahmed came to power, Tefera was appointed as the commander of the Amhara Regional Special Force by the then Amhara Region president Agegnehu Teshager in July 2021. Tefera vowed to join Fano militia after the war in Amhara broke out in 2023.

== Life and career ==
Brigadier General Tefera Mamo was born in Lalibela in Wollo Province. During the Ethiopian Civil War, Tefera joined the TPLF army to combat the Derg regime and subsequently served in the Ethiopian National Defense Force (ENDF) during EPRDF government. While there, Tefera has been subjected to arrest by TPLF officials for alleged coup against prime minister Meles Zenawi. He was vocal critic of Amhara persecution in Ethiopia during TPLF rule. During Abiy Ahmed premiership, Tefera's charge was pardoned in 2018 as a result of Abiy's political reforms.

In July 2021, the then Amhara Region president Agegnehu Teshager named Tefera as the commander of the Amhara Regional Special Force. Tefera was disappeared from the public sight that was speculated due to leg injuries from gunshot wound and sought medical treatment abroad. On 18 May 2022, he was arrested by security force in Addis Ababa, possibly said to have been abducted, during interview with Feteh amidst crackdowns against Amhara people.

In June 2022, the Amhara Supreme Court released him from prison. Amidst in the War in Amhara, on 1 July 2024, Tefera made speech in a video footage declaring his allegiance to Fano and called Amhara and its supporters to mobilize with the group.
