= Al-Shabaab invasion of Ethiopia =

July–August 2022 incursion by Somali militants

- Part of the Ethiopian–Somali conflict, the Somali Civil War (2009–present), Ethiopian civil conflict (2018–present) and the spillover of the Tigray war
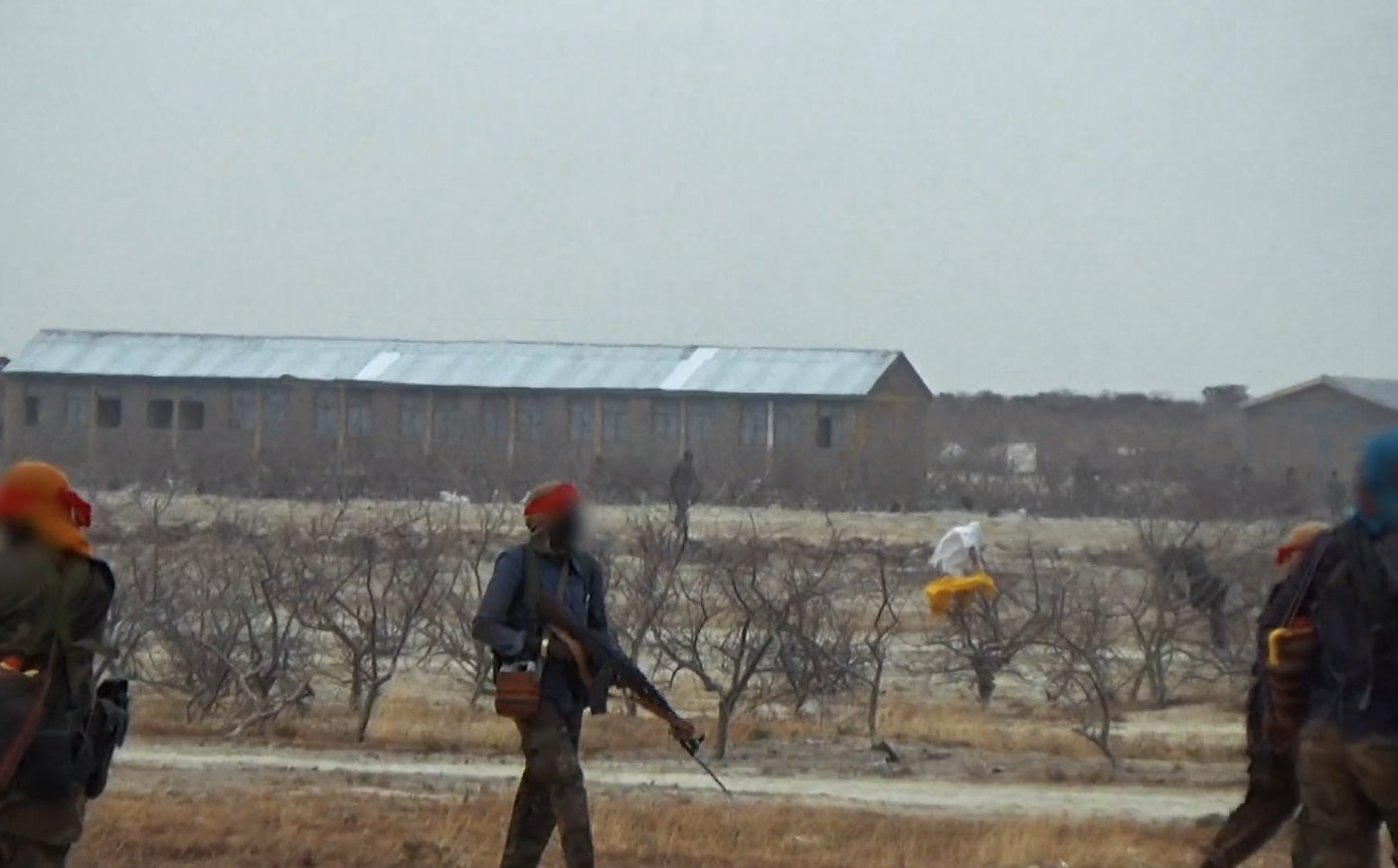
- Al-Shabaab fighters inside a Liyu Police base, 21 July 2022
Date	20 July – c. early August 2022; (2 weeks)
Location	Ethiopian–Somali border and Ethiopia's Somali Region
Result	Al-Shabaab infiltrates Bale Province of southern Ethiopia (see § Result and aftermath): Battalion-sized force of al-Shabaab fighters reach the Bale Mountains and establish presence; Somali Region officials claim to crush al-Shabaab force

Belligerents
Ethiopia; Somali Region	(Islamic State) Al-Shabaab

Commanders and leaders
Tesfaye Ayalew; Mohamed Ahmed Gurey	Ali Diyaar; Ubeda Nur Isse; Fuad Qalaf; Osman Abu Abdi Rahman

Units involved
Ethiopian Regional Special Forces; Liyu Police; Ethiopian National Defense Force (ENDF); Civilian self-defense groups	(Islamic State) Several units, including the "Ethiopian Front"

Strength
Unclear	At least 1,500 (Critical Threats estimate); ~2,000 (Le Monde estimate)

Casualties and losses
14 killed (Ethiopian claim); 187 ENDF and several hundred Somali Region forces killed (al-Shabaab claim); Heavy (local officials)	800+ killed, 100 captured (Ethiopian claim)
- 3 civilians killed (Ethiopian claim); Several administrators captured by al-Shabaab

On 20 July 2022, the Islamist militant group al-Shabaab launched an invasion from Somalia into Ethiopia's Somali Region. Taking advantage of the instability created by the Tigray war, the goal of the operation was to establish a presence for the group within southern Ethiopia.

The incursion began with over a thousand al-Shabaab fighters staging diversionary attacks on four Ethiopian–Somali border towns in order to allow a force of 500 to 800 fighters to penetrate the Ethiopian security zone and advance into the region. During the initial days of fighting, al-Shabaab primarily fought against the Somali Region's security forces. Further cross-border attacks continued in the following days, while the Ethiopian National Defense Force (ENDF) carried out counter-offensives in response.

Al-Shabaab forces advanced 150 kilometres into the Ogaden. After two weeks of intense clashes and airstrikes, the ENDF and Somali Region security forces began to reassert control. A battalion of around 500 al-Shabaab fighters succeeded in evading the Ethiopian army and reached its main target, the Bale Mountains. Several weeks after the operation was over, clashes continued to break out in border regions.

Following what was the largest attack by al-Shabaab in Ethiopian territory to date, the group was able to establish a presence in Bale and created several training camps. Al-Shabaab has not claimed any attacks in Ethiopia since mid-2022 in order to maintain their operational security. It has continued to probe the Ethiopian–Somali border in the three years since the operation.

== Background ==
Historically, the Somali inhabited Ogaden (organized into the Somali Region in 1995), along with the adjacent Ethiopian–Somali border, has been disputed and been the place of several interstate wars and insurgencies (both nationalist and Islamist). In addition, eastern Ethiopia has been affected by a number of ethno-nationalist rebellions, some of which were motivated by separatism in Oromia. During the 1960s, Bale Province, inhabited by the Oromo and Somali people, saw a major revolt against Emperor Haile Selassie lasting nearly a decade. Common Islamic faith provided a basis for cooperation between Oromo and Somalis when the insurgency broke out against the Ethiopian Empire in 1963.

In 1991, the Somali government collapsed and Somalia was embroiled in a full-scale civil war. During 1992, the Ethiopian government attacked al-Itihaad al-Islamiya (AIAI), a rising Islamist political-military group in the Ogaden that was a registered political party; in a bid to crush the movement. This sparked a jihad between the Ethiopians and AIAI. Al-Itihaad began to launch raids into Ethiopia. In doing so, it possibly forged links with local rebels such as the Islamic Front for the Liberation of Oromia (IFLO). In 1996, Ethiopia responded to these raids by launching its first armed intervention into Somalia.

In 2006, Ethiopia invaded Somalia to depose the Islamic Courts Union (ICU). During the following two years most of the country fell to an Islamist insurgency and Ethiopia eventually withdrew in 2009. The invasion and military occupation led to the rise of al-Shabaab, a youth militia within the wider armed wing of the ICU, which became an independent actor in early 2007 and then began governing territory in 2008. Instead of eliminating "Jihadist" activity, the Ethiopian invasion had led to its rise in Somalia. It resulted in increased radicalization within al-Shabaab, coalesced widespread support for it and greatly increased recruitment for the organization. By the time of the Ethiopian withdrawal from Somalia in early 2009, the forces of al-Shabaab had grown significantly in numbers, swelling from just six hundred to several thousand fighters strong since the invasion began.

Al-Shabaab has also voiced support for pan-Somali ideas, describing the Ethiopian–Somali border as "artificial". Overall, the group has only been able to organize a few attacks inside Ethiopia. In early 2007, a force led by Aden Ayro launched an incursion in retaliation for the invasion, but was repelled. Al-Shabaab has also had hostile relations with insurgents fighting for the independence of the Somali Region. During December 2007, an al-Shabaab force in the Somali Regions Degahbur Zone fought against the Ogaden National Liberation Front. Al-Shabaab leader Ahmed Godane set up the "Ethiopian Front" to organize attacks, but this force failed to make an impact. Further attack plans by the groups intelligence wing were also foiled.

Al-Shabaab later pledged allegiance to al-Qaeda in 2012. In 2014, Ethiopia was formally integrated into the African Union Mission in Somalia. Since then, the Ethiopia has maintained an armed presence, deploying both the Ethiopian National Defense Force (ENDF) as well as the Liyu Police.

=== Outbreak of Tigray war and instability in Ethiopia (2020–2021) ===
Ethiopian officials often arrested suspected al-Shabaab infiltrators. Researcher James Barnett argued that the Liyu Police in particular had organized "effective—if controversial—counterterrorism operations" which had prevented insurgents from establishing a lasting presence in Ethiopia.

In 2020, the Tigray war erupted and greatly weakened the ENDF, resulting in a partial withdrawal of Ethiopian forces from Somalia. Despite this, 4,000 Ethiopian troops remained stationed in Somalia as of mid-2022. Meanwhile, al-Shabaab experienced another period of growth, increasing the number of its attacks and capturing more territory in Somalia. In 2021, it seemed as if the Ethiopian government might collapse due to the Tigray war; security analyst Matt Bryden argued that al-Shabaab began to plan an invasion in this period. A similar analysis was provided by Barnett who argued that al-Shabaab hoped to exploit the unrest generated by the war.

=== Preparation for incursion (2021–2022) ===
Al-Shabaab spent more than a year before the attack considering the operation. It trained thousands of fighters for the operation, recruiting large numbers of ethnic Somalis and Oromo from Ethiopia. Preparations were made for an invasion by trying to set up a small supporter network at El Kari, deep inside Ethiopia. During April 2022, the Ethiopian government announced it had arrested dozens of al-Shabaab members in Elekere district as they were planning to strike targets in the capital Addis Ababa, and within the Oromia and Somali regions.

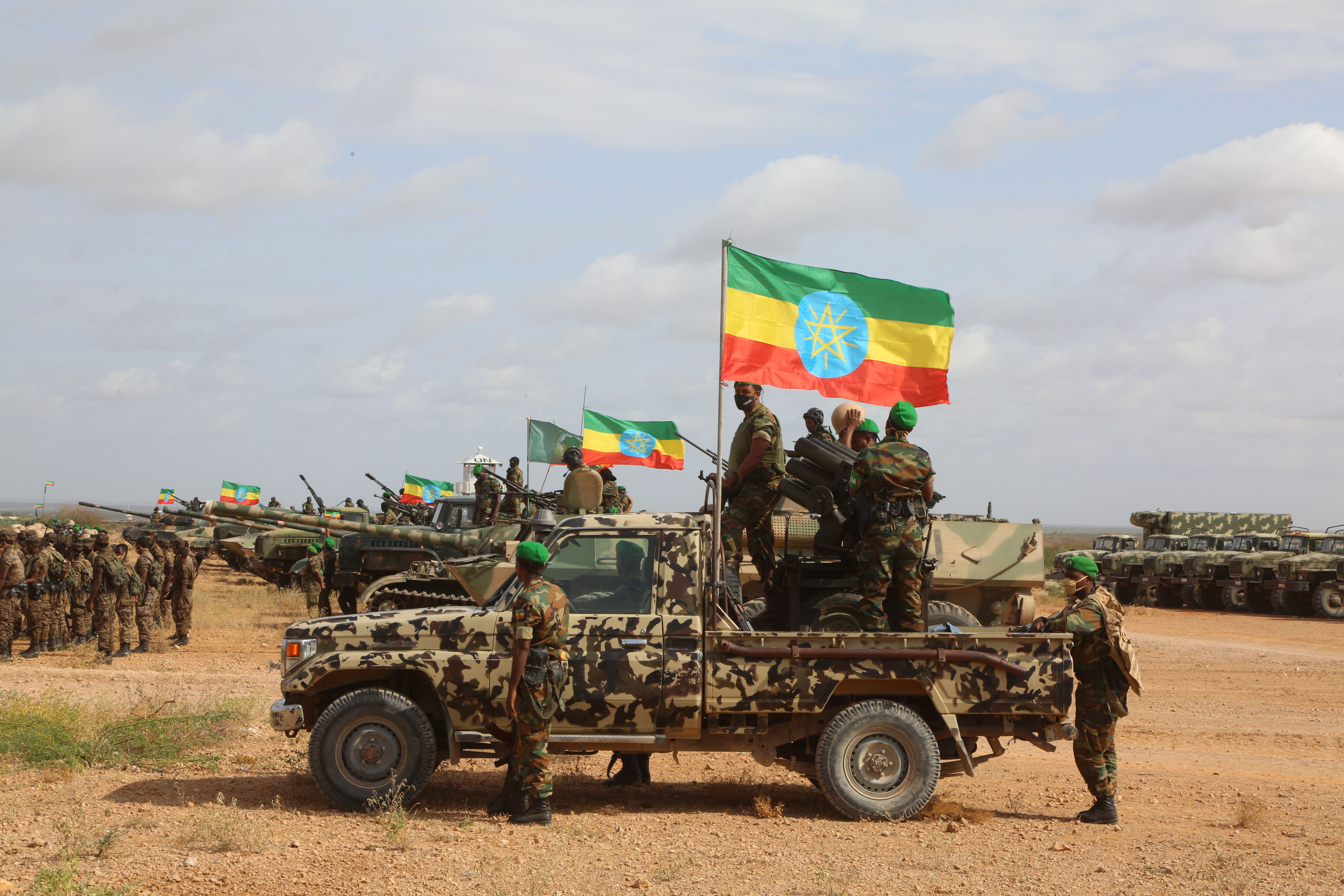
Ethiopian National Defense Force soldiers in Somalia, 2021.

In early May 2022, Somali Region forces reported intercepting al-Shabaab members who were attempting to smuggle arms into the territory. Later that month the insurgents launched a series of attacks to weaken the Ethiopian and Somali pro-government presence at the border, possibly to prepare for the following invasion. In early July, Osman Abu Abdi Rahman, al-Shabaab governor of the Somali gobol Bakool, declared war on the Liyu police. Five days before the invasion, Ethiopian security forces conducted a raid in El Kari, killing a local cleric who was identified as an "al-Shabab commander".

In late July 2022, al-Shabaab assembled 1,500–2,000 insurgents for the attack. The scale of mobilization for the incursion surprised many observers, with vehicles and supplies mobilized in large numbers by the militants.

== Invasion ==
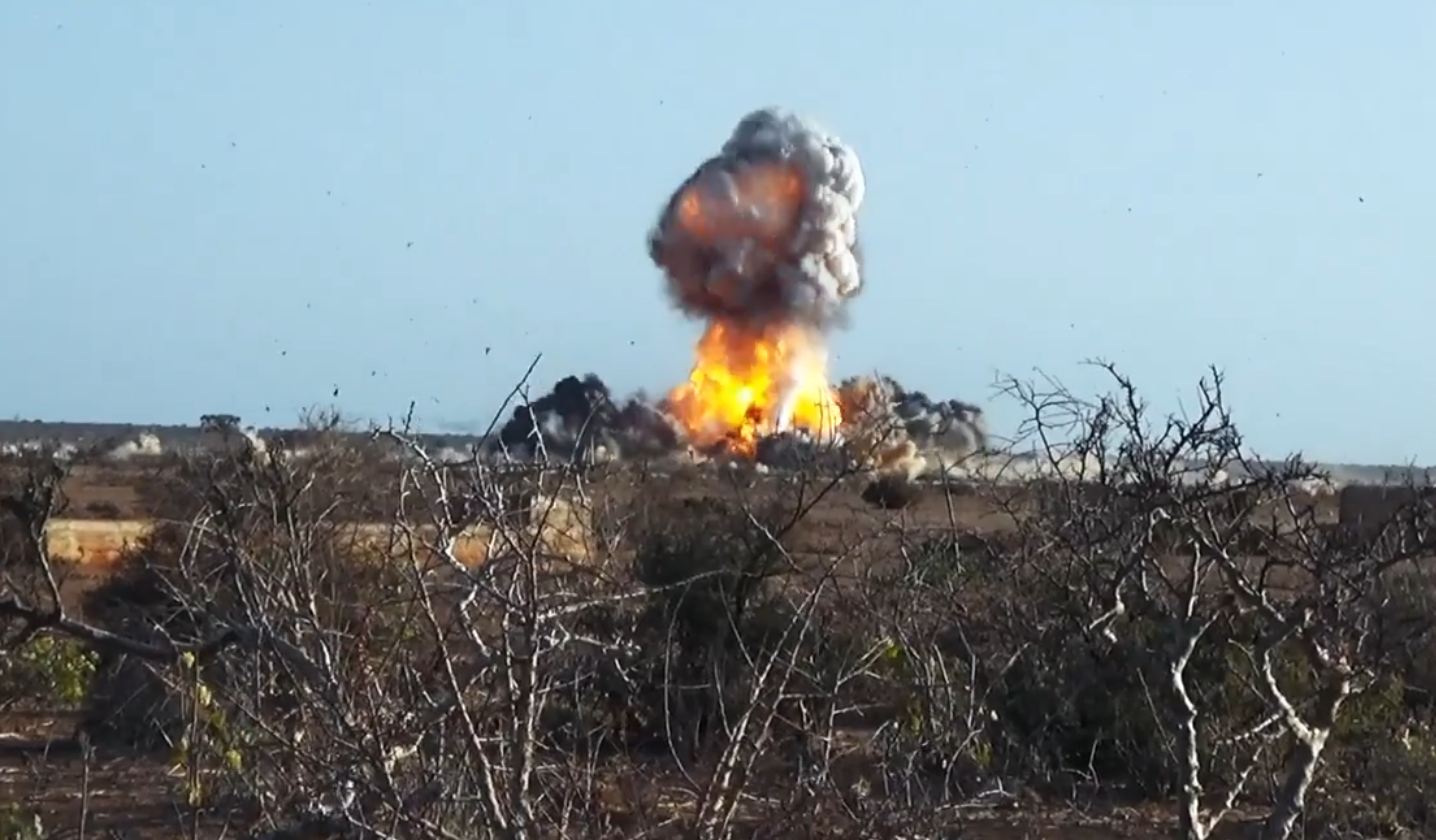
VBIED attack by Al-Shabaab insurgents on an Ethiopian security forces base along the border at the start of the incursion (20 July 2022)

The rebel offensive began on 20 July 2022, as al-Shabaab shut down the telephone networks across the South West State of Somalia. One al-Shabaab unit then launched a surprise attack on four settlements on the Somali side of the border, including the towns Aato and Yeed as well as the village of Washaaqo. These settlements were garrisoned by units of the Ethiopian Liyu police. The rebels defeated the garrisons of Aato and Yeed and proceeded to burn down the Ethiopian bases at both towns. Around this time, al-Shabaab top leader Fu'ad Mohamed Khalaf visited Aato and used the opportunity to denounce the Liyu police.

According to Voice of America journalist Harun Maruf, Critical Threats analysts Liam Karr and Emily Estelle, as well as Somali regional and intelligence officials, this first attack was a diversionary operation designed to facilitate an invasion into Ethiopian territory by another al-Shabaab force. Local officials and civilians stated that pro-government forces eventually retook Aato and Yeed. Both sides claimed to have inflicted heavy losses on the other.

Map of Ethiopia showing the locations of the invasion (red), and the targets of the rebels (blue)

On 20 or 21 July 2022, about 500 al-Shabaab fighters crossed the border at Yeed from Somalia's Bakool into Ethiopia's Afder Zone. The invading force reportedly mostly consisted of militants recruited from Ethiopia itself. Al-Shabaab's "Ethiopian Front", led by Ali Diyaar, was known to have taken part in the operation. The rebels advanced 150 kilometres (93 mi) into Ethiopian territory. They captured the town of Hulhul, but were encircled there by Somali Region paramilitary forces on 22 July. In the following, three-days-long battle for Hulhul, the rebel force was destroyed or at least forced to retreat. The Ethiopian government claimed that its troops had killed over 100 al-Shabaab rebels at Hulhul, and destroyed 13 vehicles.

On 24 or 25 July, an al-Shabaab contingent of about 200 fighters made another incursion at Ferfer, clashing with security forces at Lasqurun village. After some fighting, this attack was also repulsed by Somali Region security forces; the latter claimed to have killed 85 rebels during this clash. Meanwhile, the ENDF deployed reinforcements to the Somali Region. At this point, Ethiopian officials argued that all invaders had been eliminated, though security analysts cautioned that some rebels might had slipped through the pro-government defensive lines. The Ethiopian government later admitted that operations against al-Shabaab invaders were continuing. According to Critical Threats, one rebel unit had entered Ethiopia east of El Barde, and was still active between Gode and Kelafo by 27 July. A third invading force, counting several hundred al-Shabaab militants, reportedly also entered Ethiopia around this time. Rebels belonging to this force were subsequently sighted near El Kari, Jaraati and Imi. According to "credible reports", some al-Shabaab troops were also moving toward Moyale.

Ethiopia struck al-Shabaab positions in Somalia from the air in late July and early August.

The ENDF and Somali Region military began to plan a counter-offensive against the Somali insurgents, and subsequently launched a series of ground and air attacks along the border that inflicted several losses on the rebels. The Somali Region government also announced its plan to create a buffer zone along the border to prevent more rebel incursions. By 29 July, Aato was back under pro-government control, though was again attacked by a large al-Shabaab force. On 31 July, Ethiopia announced that it had killed three rebel commanders at the border, though al-Shabaab denied this. Fu'ad Mohamed Khalaf was initially reportedly among the dead, as was al-Shabaab's chief border commander, Ubeda Nur Isse, and a spokesman. However, none were killed. Al Shabaab released a voice recording of Qalaf, who denied Ethiopian forces killed him on July 29. He further stated that al Shabaab would continue to attack the Somali Regional Liyu police Local civilians organized ad hoc self-defense groups to hunt for rebel stragglers. The clashes in Ethiopia lasted into early August, and one small al-Shabaab contingent (initially suspected to number 50 to 100 fighters, later reported to number up to 500) actually reached its target, the Bale Mountains, probably in the wider El Kari area.

== Analysis ==
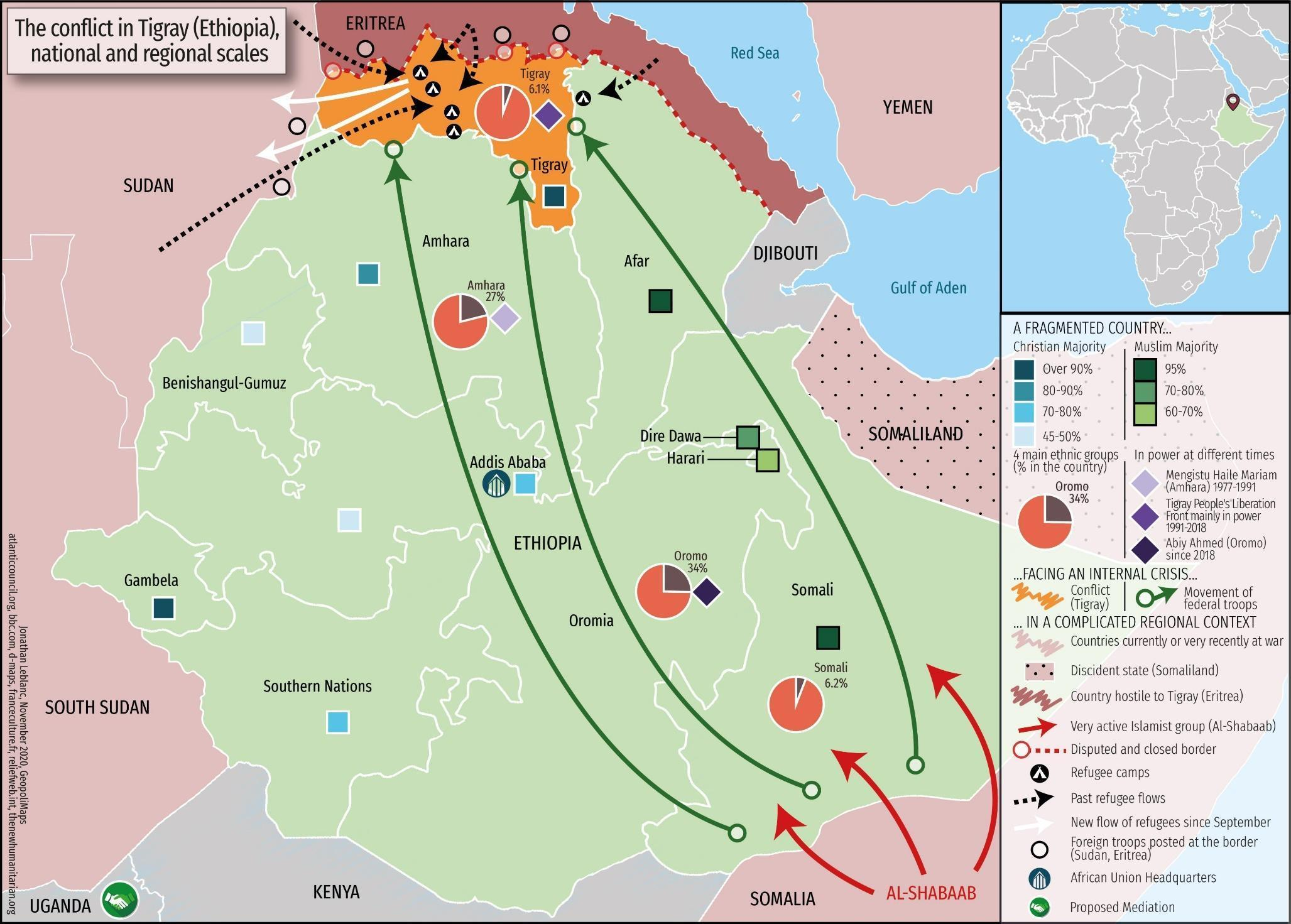
Map illustrating the Ethiopian civil conflict as of 2022; included are al-Shabaab attacks, the Tigray war zone, and the redeployment of federal troops from the southeast to the north.

Somali Region officials claimed that the al-Shabaab invaders had planned to advance up to Oromia to coordinate with the Oromo Liberation Army (OLA). OLA wages an independent insurgency against the Ethiopian government, and had become part of a major, cross-regional rebel alliance in 2021. However, the Long War Journal and other researchers argued that a cooperation between OLA and al-Shabaab is unlikely, as no independent proof of links between the two factions was surfaced so far. In addition, OLA is a secular nationalist group in stark contrast to al-Shabaab's strongly religious alignment. Instead, the official claims appeared to mirror previous statements of the Ethiopian government which has repeatedly alleged links between various local insurgent groups and al-Shabaab in order to frame any local rebels as terrorist organizations. Al-Shabaab has also previously rejected accusations of cooperating with Ethiopian rebels, stating that the latter were "un-Islamic" and "therefore unworthy of its support".

Independent journalists argued that al-Shabaab was probably not trying to coordinate with other insurgents, but instead trying to open a new frontline in Ethiopia. As fighting was still underway, Horn of Africa analyst Matt Bryden argued that the rebels had probably aimed to advance into the Bale Mountains. This was later confirmed by local officials and the movement of one al-Shabaab group. The Long War Journal speculated that al-Shabaab was intending to exploit the local tensions and fighting between various groups at Bale Mountains, including by OLA, to set up their own bases there. Former al-Shabaab official Omar Mohamed Abu Ayan argued that the invasion had been probably conducted for propaganda reasons by the Somali insurgents.

=== Casualties ===
Head of the ENDF claimed that more than 800 Shabaab fighters along with 24 top commanders had been killed. Voice of America reported that these claims could not be verified. Somali Region president Mustafa Mohammed Omar claimed more than 600 Shabaab fighters had been killed.

A number of Somali Region officials informed VOA that the al-Shabaab had inflicted heavy losses on the Ethiopians, and captured several local administrators before their main force was defeated. Al-Shabaab claimed it killed hundreds of Somali region forces. The groups Radio Andalus claimed that it had killed 187 ENDF troops in the attack.

== Result and aftermath ==
Initially it was reported about 100 al-Shabaab fighters had reached their target of the Bale Mountains, though Ethiopian officials claimed that they were too few in number to establish a viable presence. On 5 August 2022 it was reported that, "Hundreds of al-Shabab fighters were able to slip into Ethiopia last week alone", with their presence detected in numerous local communities in the Somali Region. According to a 2023 Hudson Institute report, an entire al-Shabaab battalion, about 500 militants, were able to set up a camp in the Bale Mountains due to the invasion. This battalion was reportedly mostly recruited from the Oromo ethnic group. Roland Marchal observed that al-Shabaab would likely, "... pursue a discreet policy of putting down roots. Their primary objective is not to carry out attacks, but to gain acceptance and to forge links,"

The Ethiopian government framed the invasion as a major victory over the invading force. President Omar of Somali Region stated that he had visited the troops who had retaken Hulhul, and thanked them for their service. Deeply concerned by the invasion, the ENDF increased troop deployments in the buffer zone it maintains between the border and areas where al-Shabaab is active.

A US Congressional Research Service report from April 2023 asserted that, "UN experts estimate that as many as 1,000 fighters remain in Ethiopia, giving it a foothold, despite Ethiopian claims of routing the group." Since mid-2022, al-Shabaab forces in Bale have not claimed any attacks in order to maintain their operational security. By late 2023, Barnett pointed out that the al-Shabaab unit in the Bale Mountains had not yet engaged in significant operations. It has made attempts to further reinforce its troops inside Ethiopia. For instance, the Bale Mountains-based battalion had attacked the Liyu police in August 2023 to divert attention from the border in order to enable fresh troops from Somalia to launch another incursion. In December 2023, the Ethiopian National Intelligence and Security Service claimed it had foiled a series of attacks planned by al-Shabaab in Jigjiga and several other cities in Somali Region. During March 2024, the Ethiopian Human Rights Commission released a report asserting al-Shabaab forces were operating in Bale and had killed several police officers. The reported was disputed by Ethiopian authorities in Bale who claimed there were no Shabaab insurgents in the region.

Although Ethiopian forces established their buffer zone during Somali government offensive in 2022 that pushed back the insurgents, al‑Shabaab continues to probe Ethiopian–Somali border defences. With new supply lines opened during insurgent offensives within Somalia's central regions during the summer of 2025, it can now sustain more frequent, larger‑scale cross‑border operations against Ethiopia.

== See also ==
- List of invasions in the 21st century
