= Oromo–Somali clashes =

Territorial conflict between Oromia Region and Somali Region in Ethiopia

- Part of the conflicts in the Horn of Africa and Ethiopian civil conflict (2018–present)
Date	14 December 2016 – 6 August 2018 (1 year, 7 months, 3 weeks and 2 days)
Location	Border between Oromia and Somali regional states
Result	Abdi Illey arrested

Belligerents
Ethiopia: (Oromia Region) Oromia	(Somali Region) Somali: (Somali Region) Liyu Police

Commanders and leaders
Lemma Megersa; Shimelis Abdisa	Abdi Illey (POW)

Casualties and losses
- 500+ killed in total

The Oromo–Somali clashes flared up in December 2016 following territorial disputes between Oromia region and Somali region's Government in Ethiopia. Hundreds of people were killed and more than 1.5 million people fled their homes. The conflict ended in 2018.

== Background ==
Ethiopia has a federal political arrangement structured along ethno-linguistic lines. The Oromia Region is the largest and most populous state in the country and primarily consists of those of the Oromo ethnic group, the largest ethnic group in the country. Meanwhile, the Somali Region is the second largest state by area in the country and primarily consists of those of the Somali ethnic group.

This conflict is often viewed as an unfair conflict as the Somali Liyu Police force, which was founded in 2009, and was receiving aid from the ruling government of Ethiopia the TPLF against pastoralist Oromos inhabiting their homeland in the Somali Region. Somalis and Oromos clashed over Oromo lands. Even though there was evidence that Somalis under Abdi Iley abused human rights, the ruling government failed to do anything, even during Oromo protest in 2015-2016. Somali president and head of Somali Liyu police was arrested after the Tigray regime came to a end in 2018.

In 2004, a referendum to decide on the fate of more than 420 Kebeles, the country's smallest administrative unit, saw 80% of the kebeles go to Oromia, leading to Somali minorities fleeing those areas. The Jarso population who resided in the region and have been under huge pressure and persecution by the Somali administration of the Somali Region, voted greatly to join the Oromo Region.

Since April 2007 a major counterinsurgency campaign was started to suppress the low-level insurgents of the Ogaden National Liberation Front. The Liyu police was established specifically for this campaign in the Somali Region. Human Right Watch reports evidence of Liyu police incursions in the Oromia Region. This led the Liyu police to become involved in the Oromia-Somali border clashes.

== Course of the conflict ==
=== 2004 ===
In February 22 Somali forcers along with unknown ethnic groups (probably the Tigray) had burned 103 Oromo huts injured 31 Oromos, and killed 18 Oromos. In March 2004, over 100 Somalis were killed in the Mieso, Asabot and Bordode towns in Mieso district (West Hararge) when 20/21 kebeles were put under the control of Oromia region and over 50,000 of them were displaced. In December 2004 Armed Somali-Ethiopian forces had displaced almost 800 Oromos in the Erer town.

=== 2009 ===
Clashes between the Boorana people and the Garre, a Somali clan, occurred in early 2009 in the area of Moyale. On February 5, 2009, up to 300 people were killed. Directly following the clash people fled the area.

=== 2016 ===
The exacerbation of the conflict in 2016 is speculated to be caused from competition arisen from a prolonged drought. From December 2016 at the border of the Oromia and Somali regions, the Oromia and Somali communities territorial tension boiled, notably near the town of Deka, leaving at least 30 people dead and more than 50,000 displaced. Over 100,000 Somalis living in the East Hararghe and West Hararghe regions for over 2 generations were displaced in 2017 to the Qoloji IDP camp in the Somali Region following the massacre of over 170 women and children in December 2017 and in total over 1000 of them were killed in multiple attacks starting from 2016 as the Oromo claim that the area is their ancestral land and that the Somali families had been brought in from Ethiopian Somali regional. In the Somali region, according to a Oromo man from Kebri Beyah the clashes had escalated into discrimination namely in the Somali region as no one would go to Oromo stores, visit Oromos or even have any contact with them. This was followed by the displacement of 50,000 Oromos in the capital Jijiga which has a population of 125,000.The clashes involved heavily armed men on both sides in locations all along the border. Schools were looted and civil servants were shot in their offices. Residents on the both sides also reported widespread rapes. In February and March, hundreds were reported to have been killed in the southern Oromia district of Negele Borana, after an incursion by a paramilitary force called the Liyu police, which was backed by the ruling federal government, more than 100 people died and thousands were displaced in February and March in the Negele area. Oromo activists have claimed much higher numbers.

=== 2017 ===
On 20 April 2017 the Oromia and Somali states of Ethiopia have signed an agreement to peacefully solve disputes. The agreement was brokered by the federal government of Ethiopia. Both regional states agreed to enforce the results of the referendum of 2005. It was recognised further administrative decisions needed to be taken on a further 157 Kebeles on the border between both regions. In spite of this agreement clashes erupted in September 2017, killing hundreds of the Somali ethnicity and some on Oromo side.

The regional special police of both states, called the Liyu in the Somali region and the Liyu Hail of Oromia state, have been accused of being behind many of the atrocities.

=== 2018 ===
In May 2018, four people were killed and 200 houses burned in clashes. Both Somali and Oromo militias were behind the attacks.

In July 2018, Oromo militias killed 50 Somalis.

In September 2018, 58 people were killed in ethnic clashes. Following the clashes on the weekend of 15–16 September protests against ethnic clashes begun in Addis Ababa.

In December 2018, 21 Oromo people were killed and 61 were wounded in by Somali militias, heavy artillery was used. Five thousand civilians fled to Kenya. Somali militias were also responsible for killing 9 people in the city of Moyale, a city on the Ethiopian and Kenyan border.

== Casualties ==
=== Displaced people ===
Up to 400,000 were displaced by the fighting as of November 2017. Mr Adisu said the clashes had displaced many people, some of whom have taken refuge in makeshift camps at a stadium in the eastern city of Harar, whilst others are camping at police stations. Drought, and floods caused additional displacements bringing the overall number of displaced people to a total of nearly 1,1 million.

== See also ==
- Sudanese nomadic conflicts
- Herder–farmer conflicts in Nigeria
