= Liyu Police =

Gendarmerie force in Ethiopia

- ልዩ ኀይል; Ciidamada Liyuu
- Active: April 2007—present
- Country: Ethiopia
- Allegiance: (Somali Region) Somali
- Branch: Ethiopian Regional Special Forces
- Type: Paramilitary; Gendarmerie
- Role: Gendarmerie; Reserve army Counter-insurgency; Internal security Light infantry
- Size: 10,000–14,000 (2013); 42,000 (2017)
- Garrison/HQ: Jijiga
- Equipment: AK-47; AKM; Type 56; RPK; PKM; RPD; DShK; Dragunov SVD; FN FAL; RPG-7; WZ-551
- Engagements: Insurgency in Ogaden; 2007–2008 Ethiopian crackdown in Ogaden; Ethiopian civil conflict (2018–present); Oromo–Somali clashes; Afar–Somali clashes; 2022 al-Shabaab invasion of Ethiopia; Dacawalay Conflict

Commanders
- Founder: Abdi Mohamoud Omar (Abdi Iley)
- Former commander: Abdirahman Abdillahi Burale (Abdirahman Labagole)
- Former commander: Mohamed Ahmed Mohamud

The Liyu Police (Amharic: ልዩ ኀይል, Somali: Ciidamada Liyuu; liyu meaning "special" in Amharic) is a gendarmerie and paramilitary unit operating in the Somali Region of Ethiopia. Established in 2007 by the regional government of the Somali Region in collaboration with the federal government of Ethiopia, the force was created as a counter-insurgency force to fight ONLF insurgents during the Insurgency in Ogaden and counter cross-border threats from neighboring countries.

The Liyu Police is part of the Ethiopian Regional Special Forces and has become one of the most controversial and polarizing forces in Ethiopia, where it has gained notoriety for its brutal counter-insurgency operations and methods, as well as allegations of human rights abuses.

== Overview ==
The Liyu Police was established in the wake of the Abole oil facility raid in April 2007 by the separatist group Ogaden National Liberation Front (ONLF). The attack resulted in the Ethiopian National Defence Force (ENDF) escalating its operations against ONLF in the Somali Region. Liyu Police was formed as a specialized unit tasked with combating insurgent groups, such as the Ogaden National Liberation Front (ONLF), which sought autonomy or independence for the Somali Region. The paramilitary police force was formed by Abdi Mohamoud Omar (Abdi Illey), who at the time served as the security chief of the Somali regional state. Between 2010 and 2018, Abdi Illey was the president of the Somali regional state and the group reported directly to him. The force was eventually based on the model of the Sudanese Janjaweed militias and was used to intimidate civilians suspected to supporting the ONLF and provided a façade for human rights violations not to be associated with the military itself. After ONLF's peace agreement with Ethiopia in 2018 many ONLF fighters subsequently joined the force.

The group receives funding by the Ethiopian federal government and has close links to the Ethiopian military, with the backing of the United States and the United Kingdom (especially when the force was first established). In 2013, the group had between 10,000 and 14,000 members. The force strength increased to 42,000 in 2017. Operating under the authority of the Somali regional government, the force was initially envisioned as a localized solution to regional security issues. However, its mandate expanded over time, and it became deeply integrated into Ethiopia's broader counter-terrorism and security strategies. Unlike other gendarmerie regional forces in Ethiopia, the Liyu Police operates with significant autonomy and is equipped with military-grade weapons and training, effectively functioning as a paramilitary unit. This unique status has made it a central player in maintaining—or destabilizing—security in the Somali Region.

== Structure and operations ==
The Liyu Police is composed primarily of members from the Ogaden clan, and especially from the Rer Abdille, the subclan of Abdi Iley. According to reports, recruitment is voluntary, and there is no evidence of forced conscription. Members are well-paid and are allowed to keep looted goods. The force is led by regional authorities, but its operations often align with the Ethiopian federal government's strategic objectives, particularly in border areas and conflict zones. They are armed with better and more modern weapons than the weapons used by ordinary police, with the equipment Liyu Police are equipped with being comparable to that of the ENDF. The force was first led by Abdirahman Abdillahi Burale (also known as Abdirahman Labago'le).

The Liyu Police has been deployed in various capacities, including conducting counter-insurgency operations against armed groups like the ONLF, securing Ethiopia's porous borders, particularly with Somalia and Somaliland as well as engaging in cross-border operations to combat militant organizations such as al-Shabaab. The Liyu Police operates regional checkpoints and patrols border areas.

Despite its stated purpose, the force has also been implicated in internal conflicts, including clashes with neighbouring Oromo communities during the Oromo–Somali clashes.

== Controversies and human rights concerns ==
The Liyu Police has faced widespread criticism for its responsibility for numerous human rights abuses, including extrajudicial executions, rape, abductions and torture in the Ethiopian regional states of Somali and Oromia and in Somalia, especially between 2013 and 2018. The Liyu Police conduct retaliatory operations against local communities and have destroyed villages throughout the Somali region. In Ethiopia's Jail Ogaden, which was controlled by the group, Liyu Police members were involved in the rape, torture and humiliation of prisoners.

Liyu Police has regularly conducted collective punishment on civilians, punishing entire families for the "sins" of their relatives by detaining them and sending them to various detention centers (including the infamous Jail Ogaden) and looting their livestock, dooming the family into destitution. The paramilitary force would also force accused ONLF members and their relatives to dig their own graves before being buried alive. The Liyu's main methods of killing includes shooting, strangulation, stoning, clubbing and severe beating. Public executions and torture were very common. Victims would be handcuffed with their arms tied to their backs in front of the villagers, children, women and everyone else to watch the performance. Tens of thousands in the Somali Region are believed to have been left physically or mentally disabled as a result of Liyu Police abuses.

Rape was also very common, with hordes of young Liyu men redeployed in the various Ogaden villages relentlessly and in total impunity raping their victims, which included little girls as young as seven years old. This is encouraged by the leadership, including former Somali Region president Abdi Iley who told Liyu Police commander in his first speech: "Forward to the enemy with your gun against their men, and your penis against their women". Liyu's largest and most brutal expedition, personally ordered by Abdi himself, was code-named gus iyo gumac ('penis and bullet'), meaning rape and murder.

Liyu Police members were under constant pressure to outperform among themselves, and their successes and promotions were measured by how many people they killed, tortured and raped, with failure to execute as instructed resulting in detention, beating and demotion. Members who were suspected of having sympathy for victims of Liyu Police abuses would often become victims themselves.

The force is also accused of the torture and mock execution of Swedish journalists Martin Schibbye and Johan Persson in 2011.

According to UN information, an estimated 30 to 40 people were killed in May and June 2015 during fighting near the Somalia border. Liyu Police has also been involved in clan fighting in Somalia, including in Galgadud and Hiran regions, while it has arrested people in Bakool. From 26 May to 1 June 2015 Liyu Police killed hundreds of people and burned whole villages near the Shilavo district in Ogaden, alongside the border with Somalia, in the span of six days. Raids by the Liyu Police on villages in Oromia region, which started in 2016, caused the death of hundreds and the displacement of over 1 million people.

Human rights organizations and independent analysts have highlighted the lack of transparency and oversight surrounding the Liyu Police's operations. Critics argue that the force's unchecked power and militarized approach have exacerbated tensions in the Somali Region rather than resolving them.

In 2019, efforts were made to reform the Liyu Police following the removal of Abdi Iley, the former president of the Somali Region. These reforms aimed to reduce the force's influence and integrate its operations more closely with federal security structures. In September 2019 the new Liyu Police commander Mohamed Ahmed Mohamud claimed the force had discontinued its use of live bullets for rubber batons as part of a reform process. In April 2023 President Mustafa Omar Cagjar announced reforms including rebranding the Liyu Police force as an official police entity, discontinuing military operations at the borders, and issuing new uniforms. However, reports suggest that the Liyu Police continues to operate with considerable autonomy, raising concerns about ongoing abuses.

In December 2024, the force was accused of killing at least 40 civilians in Da'awaley near Somaliland, further fueling public outrage and calls for accountability.

== See also ==
- Ethiopian National Defense Force
