= American Embassy =

American Embassy may refer to:

- Any of the embassies maintained by the US
- The American Embassy, a 2002 television show on the Fox network
