= Abdi Mohamoud Omar =

Somali-Ethiopian politician; President of Somali Region from 2010 to 2018

- Cabdi Maxamuud Cumar
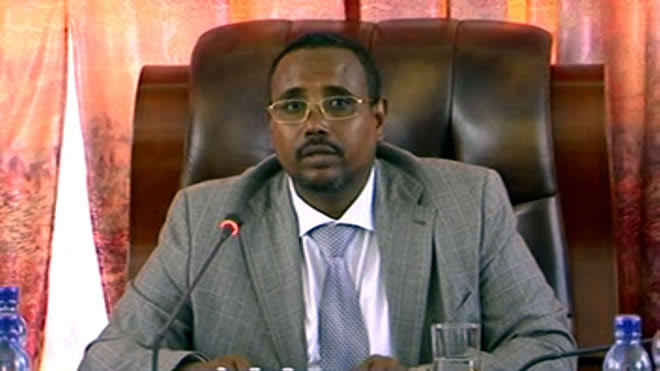

President of the Somali Region
- In office 2010–2018
- Succeeded by: Mustafa Mohammed Omar

Personal details
- Born: 1966 (age 59–60) Degehabur, Hararghe Province, Ethiopian Empire
- Citizenship: Ethiopia
- Party: Ethiopian Somali People's Democratic Party

Abdi Mohamoud Omar (Somali: Cabdi Maxamuud Cumar; born 1966), also known as Abdi Ilay (Somali: Cabdi Ilay), is an Ethiopian politician who served as the president of the Somali Region in Ethiopia from 2010 to 2018.

He was a member of the ruling regional party Ethiopian Somali People's Democratic Party (ESPDP), as well as a number five of the Meles Zenawi Foundation. Abdi Omar was removed from these positions and arrested a few months after Prime Minister Abiy Ahmed assumed office. Following his arrest, he was imprisoned on charges of human rights abuses until his release in March 2024, when all charges against him were dropped.

== Career ==
Abdi Omar’s name appeared on the electoral list during the 2005 Ethiopian election, when the Somali tribes in the Somali Region were loggerheaded for sharing electoral seats.

Becoming a member of parliament proved challenging as Abdi Omar originated from a small sub-clan of the Abdille, the major clan of the Ogaden which lacked an official district within the Korahe region. His candidates caused significant controversy, however, the interference of indisputable Ethiopian military commanders ultimately resulted in his registration as a parliament member, representating the Korahe region.

Before Abdi Omar was elected president of Somali region, he served as the regional security chief under president Abdullahi Lugbur, countering numerous threats by both ONLF rebels and the Islamic extremist group Al-Ittihad.

== Resignation, charges, and release ==
On 6 August 2018, Abdi Omar resigned as President of the Somali Region following the unconstitutional forceful removal and the violence that erupted in the regional capital Jigjiga two days earlier. He was replaced as president by Mustafa Muhummed Omer. On 27 August, Abdi Omar was arrested by federal forces and charged with crimes. On 30 January 2019, he was additionally charged with attempting to incite violence and "overthrow the constitutional order", and was held in custody.

On March 14, 2024, the Ethiopian Ministry of Justice withdrew all pending charges against Omar and ordered his unconditional release from prison, citing the "sake of public interest". His release occurred after he had served more than five years in custody following his August 2018 arrest.
