= Mustafe Mohammed Omer =

Somali politician; President of Somali Region since 2018

- Mustafe Muxumed Cumar

Chief Administrator of Somali Region
- Incumbent
- Assumed office 22 August 2018
- Deputy: Ibrahim Osman
- Preceded by: Abdi Mohamoud Omar

Personal details
- Born: 1972 (age 53–54) Aware, Hararghe Province, Ethiopia
- Party: Prosperity Party
- Other political affiliations: Ethiopian Somali People's Democratic Party
- Education: Addis Ababa University (BA); Imperial College London (MA)

Mustafe Mohammed Omer (Somali: Mustafe Muxumed Cumar; born 1972), also called Cagjar, is an Ethiopian politician who is the current president of the Somali Region and also the Deputy Chairman of the Somali Democratic Party, a member of Ethiopia’s newly formed Prosperity Party led by Abiy Ahmed, the sitting prime minister of Ethiopia.

Mustafe was appointed to the acting presidency on 22 August 2018 becoming the 13th president of Somali Region following a political crisis where the Ethiopian military forced Abdi Mohamoud Omar to resign after a stand-off with the central government. Omer has previously worked as a teacher activist, and humanitarian in food security (pastoral and agro-pastoral livelihoods), partnership, resource mobilization, and strategic planning roles in different NGOs. He previously served as an advisor to the UN Humanitarian Coordinator for Somalia.

== Life ==
Mustafe was born in 1972 in Aware, in the Jarar

Mustafe attended primary and intermediate school in the Aware district of the Jarar region. His family relocated to Degahbur where he started secondary school at Degahbur. He attended Addis Ababa University where he received an undergraduate degree in economics. He also received a Master's in Science in Agricultural Economics from Imperial College London.

=== Other venture ===
Mustafe became a teacher at the Jijiga college and was later promoted to vice deputy assistant. He served as deputy of the Somali regional education office. He worked with international non-governmental institutions in different positions such as Save the Children, Oxfam and OCHA. During work in the United Nations, he was a critic of the ex-president of the Somali Region.
