= List of power stations in Ethiopia =

This page lists power stations in Ethiopia, both integrated with the national power grid but also isolated ones. Due to the quickly developing demand for electricity in Ethiopia, operational power plants are listed as well as those under construction and also proposed ones likely to be built within a number of years.

Hydro, wind, solar, geothermal, cogeneration, diesel
Power plants in Ethiopia (under construction / operational) ≥ 1 MW_{e} installed capacity (as of 2017)

== Overview ==
Due to favorable conditions in Ethiopia (water power, wind power, photovoltaics, geothermal energy) for power generation, the country avoids exploiting and importing fossil fuels as much as possible. As Ethiopia is a quickly developing country, the demand for electricity grows by 30% each year. This results in a very dynamic situation with many power plants being planned simultaneously or being under construction.

In the year 2014 Ethiopia had – according to an estimation of the CIA – an annual electricity production of 9.5 TWh and was at position 101 worldwide. The total installed capacity was ~2,4 GW_{e} (position 104). In July 2017, the country had a total installed capacity of ~4.3 GW_{e} and an annual electricity production of 12.5 TWh. In 2017, hydropower has the largest share with 89.5% of the installed capacity and with 93,4% of the annual electricity production.

== Guide to the lists ==
The lists provide all power plants within the Ethiopian national power grid (Ethiopian InterConnected System (ICS)). In addition, listed are all ICS power plants under construction, under rehabilitation or in stand-by-mode. And finally it lists all ICS power plants in planning stage which are foreseen (or are given chances) to be going into the construction stage until 2025. All ICS power plants are administered by Ethiopian Electric Power (EEP), the state-owned enterprise for electricity production. The lists are up-to-date as of September 2017.

Also, an incomplete selection of operational off-grid power plants (Self-Contained Systems (SCS)) is provided by additional lists. Some of the SCS power stations are private power stations, others are administered by regional or local administrations. The SCS power stations are either small hydropower or Diesel generators usually with an installed capacity <1 MW each. The total power generation is 6.2 MW_{e} for small hydropower SCS, while SCS Diesel generators make up a total of 20.65 MW_{e}. There are also around 40,000 small off-grid solar home systems (including slightly larger solar institutional systems) for remote rural areas of Ethiopia with a total installed capacity of another 4 MW_{e}. All SCS power plants combined have an installed capacity of around 30 MW_{e}.

Provided is most often the nameplate capacity but not the effective capacity of the power plants. Most lists also provide the annual capacity factor for the power plants, which are the actual numbers for the Ethiopian fiscal year 2016/2017 (ended in July 2017). For construction projects or planned power plants, the expected capacity factor is given in brackets. With the installed capacity known and the capacity factor given, one could do the math (not done on this page) and derive the actual (or planned) annual energy production (in GWh).

The lists arrived from a survey of newspapers, World Bank documents and reports, including the EEP itself. The main documents for the power plants in planning stage on this page came from the Ethiopian Power System Expansion Master Plan Study, EEP 2014 and from the Ethiopian Geothermal Power System Master Plan, JICA 2015.

== Lists of ICS power plants ==
A complete list for all Ethiopian ICS power plants was published by the Ethiopian Electric Power (EEP) in September 2017.

=== Renewable energies ===
==== Hydropower ====
ICS power plant	Coordinates	River	Drainage basin	Installed capacity (MW_{e})	Capacity factor (2016/17)	Total reservoir size [km^{3}]	Dam height [m] run-of-river	Irrigation area [km^{2}]	Operational since	Status	Notes
Aba Samuel		Akaki	Afar Triangle	6.6	0.25	0.035	22	no	1932		Rehabilitation; 1970 to 2016
Koka (Awash I)	8.468°N 39.156°E	Awash	Afar Triangle	43	0.23	1.9	47	no	1960		
Awash II+III		Awash	Afar Triangle	64	0.21	river	run-of-river	no	1966; 1971		
Fincha	9.561°N 37.413°E	Fincha	Abbay	134	0.63	0.65	20	no	1973		
Fincha Amerti Neshe (FAN)	9.789°N 37.269°E	Amerti / Neshe	Abbay	95	0.13	0.19	38	127	2011		
Gilgel Gibe I	7.831°N 37.322°E	Gilgel Gibe	Turkana Basin	184	0.43	0.92	40	no	2004		cascade with Gilgel Gibe II
Gilgel Gibe II	7.927°N 37.389°E	Gilgel Gibe / Omo	Turkana Basin	420	0.41	diversion weir	46.5	no	2010		cascade with Gilgel Gibe I
Gilgel Gibe III	6.844°N 37.301°E	Omo	Turkana Basin	1,870	0.30	14.7	246	no	2016		cascade with Koysha
Koysha Dam	6.584°N 36.565°E	Omo	Turkana Basin	(2,160)	(0.34)	6	179	no		under construction	cascade with Gilgel Gibe III
Melka Wakena	7.225°N 39.462°E	Shebelle	Shebelle	153	0.30	0.75	42	no	1989		
Tana Beles	11.82°N 36.92°E	Beles	Nile	460	0.61	9.1	floodgates	1,400	2010		
Tekeze	13.348°N 38.742°E	Tekeze	Nile	300	0.26	9.3	188	no	2010		
Tis Abay I+II	11.486°N 37.587°E	Blue Nile	Nile	84.4	0.015	river	run-of-river	no	1953; 2001		
GERD Hidase	11.214°N 35.089°E	Abbay	Abbay	5,150	0.28	74	155	no	2025	operational	de facto cascade with Roseires Dam
Genale Dawa III	5.51°N 39.718°E	Ganale	Jubba	254	0	2.6	110	no	2017	operational	cascade with Genale Dawa VI
Genale Dawa VI	5.68°N 40.93°E	Ganale	Jubba	(257)	(0.67)	0.18	39	270		project implementation	cascade with Genale Dawa III; Public-Private Partnership
Geba I+II	8.211°N 36.073°E	Gebba	Abbay	(385)	(0.52)	1.4	46; 70	4,800		project implementation	
Total				12,020							
Total operational				9,218							

The average capacity factor of all the shown Ethiopian hydropower plants was at 0.46 in the year 2014/15, an average value from the worldwide perspective. In 2016/17, the average capacity factor was well below the 2014/2015 value. The reason is simple: the power grid got plenty of power generation reserves with the large Gilgel Gibe III power plant going into operation in 2016.

Run-of-river schemes (without reservoir) totally depend on the flow of the river, which might be low in times of drought. Sometimes a run-of-river hydropower plant sits behind another hydropower plant in a cascade, so that their operation does not depend on the river but on the upstream size of the reservoir feeding the upstream hydropower plant. Such a scheme exists in the several cases (see Remarks). This makes more efficient use of the existing water supply.

Given by the table is the total volume of the reservoir for several hydropower plants but not the live volume, the usable part of the volume for hydropower generation. The live volume is not always known, therefore it is not shown in the lists, but a few examples can be given. The Tekezé-reservoir has a live volume of 5.3 km^{3}, that is less than 58% of the total volume of 9.3 km^{3}. For Genale Dawa III on the other hand, a live volume of 2.3 km^{3} is present, that is almost 90% of the total volume of the reservoir. For the larger reservoir of the Gilgel Gibe III power plant, the live volume amounts to 11.75 km^{3}, 80% of the total size of the reservoir. The Koysha reservoir, although equipped with more turbine generators than Gilgel Gibe III is considered to get a live volume of only 5.2 km^{3}. Koysha will depend on the cascade with Gibe III and is considered to be operated partially in run-of-river mode. And finally, the Grand Ethiopian Renaissance Dam, the live volume is about 59.2 km^{3}, also 80% of the total size of the reservoir.

==== Wind farms ====
According to The Wind Power, the number of wind parks in operation (as of July 2017) was three. All these wind parks deliver power to the national grid; they are ICS power stations.

Wind farm	Location	Coordinates	Installed capacity (MW_{e})	Capacity factor (2016/17)	Turbines	Operational since	Notes
Adama I	Adama	8.564°N 39.235°E	51	0.30	34	2012	
Adama II	Adama	8.564°N 39.235°E	153	0.32	102	2015	
Ashegoda	Hintalo Wajirat	13.425°N 39.523°E	120	0.21	84	2013	
Ayisha I	Ayisha	10.754°N 42.585°E	(120)	(0.34)	80		under construction
Ayisha II	Ayisha	10.754°N 42.585°E	(120)	(0.41)	48		under construction; Ayisha III will follow
Total			564				
Total operational			324				

Ayisha I (120 MW_{e}), Ayisha II (120 MW_{e}) and Ayisha III (60 MW_{e}) are bundled in one concession. This means, that all three will be under construction more or less simultaneously. The total installed capacity will be 300 MW_{e}.

==== Geothermics ====
All geothermal power plants are designed to be ICS power plants. They are primarily considered to be baseload power plants.

ICS power plant	Location	Coordinates	Installed capacity (MW_{e})	Capacity factor (2016/17)	Thermal energy (MW_{th})	Wells	Operational since	Status	Notes
Aluto I	Aluto Langano	7.789°N 38.794°E	7.3	0	80	4	1998	mothballed	out-of-operation for most of the time
Aluto II	Aluto Langano	7.789°N 38.794°E	(75)	(0.8)		8		committed, in implementation	
Tendaho I	Dubti	11.75°N 41.09°E	(10)	(0.8)		6		under construction	
Corbetti I	Shashamane	7.18°N 38.44°E	(10)	(0.8)		3–5		under construction until 2020	One concession of Corbetti I-III with Tulu Moye I-IV (total ~1020 MW)
Corbetti II	Shashamane	7.18°N 38.44°E	(50)	(0.8)		9–13		committed, in implementation	One concession of Corbetti I-III with Tulu Moye I-IV (total ~1020 MW)
Tulu Moye I	Arsi Zone	8.159°N 39.137°E	(50)	(0.90)				under construction until 2021	One concession of Corbetti I-III with Tulu Moye I-IV (total ~1020 MW)
Total			202.3						
Total operational			0						

The energy conversion efficiency of geothermal energies is low, at 10-15%, so that the released thermal energy is much larger than the obtained electrical energy. But thermal energy does not cost anything, so a low energy conversion efficiency does not hurt.

A total of ~520 MW is planned at the Corbetti site, with 10 MW under construction in the years 2018-2019 (Corbetti I) financed by equity. Almost simultaneously, Corbetti II with 50-60 MW will be developed, based on debt financing. After these two first phases, a simple GO decision by the stakeholders is required to start the construction works of Corbetti III to add another 440-60 MW until 2025. In parallel to the construction works at the Corbetti site, it is foreseen to start working at the Tulu Moye geothermal sites with ~520 MW in four phases, Tulu Moye I with 50 MW until 2021 and after a GO decision, Tulu Moye II-IV with 470 MW (see planned geothermal projects below) until 2027.

The total concession package agreed on between the Ethiopian government and the project stakeholders allows for the development of 1020 MW of geothermal energy at the respective sites.

==== Solar parks ====
Energy generation from solar energy in Ethiopia is limited to photovoltaic systems, only solar parks operating with flat panel solar cells will be built and operated. Ethiopia is specifying its solar parks with the ac-converted nominal power output MW_{ac} instead of the standard dc-based MW_{p}. Ethiopia so avoids some confusion about the nominal power output.

ICS solar park	Location	Coordinates	Installed capacity (MW_{ac})	Capacity factor	Park size [km^{2}]	Operational since	Status	Notes
Metehara	Metehara	8.964°N 39.911°E	(100)	(0.32)	(2.5)		project implementation	1st solar park

No solar-thermal power plants are planned. The first large solar park is considered to be operational by 2019. All solar parks will be operated by private owners equipped with a long-term power purchase agreement.

==== Thermal ====
Renewable sources for thermal power plants include agricultural wastes, wood, urban wastes. In short: biomass. Two types of these thermal power plants exist in Ethiopia:

1. Simple biomass thermal power plants, all electricity generated is exported to the power grid.
2. Biomass thermal power plants that are cogeneration, meaning that they are captive power plants attached to a factory, typically a sugar factory, and the electricity produced is consumed mainly by that factory, with only surplus power being supplied to the national grid.

===== Simple thermal =====
There is only one biomass-based thermal power plant in Ethiopia which is not attached to some large factory (therefore it is "simple" and not "cogenerational"). Located at the site of the main landfill (Koshe) of the capital Addis Ababa is the first waste-to-energy power plant of Ethiopia, Reppie waste-to-energy plant. It will be an ICS power plant. The power plant operates with a 110 MW_{th} boiler that is designed to deliver sufficient steam to one single 25 MW_{e} generating unit. Therefore, and irrespective the existence of a second 25 MW_{e} turbine-generator, the power plant cannot generate more than 25 MW_{e} without special measures (like a future plant expansion).

ICS thermal plant	Location	Coordinates	Fuel	Thermal capacity (MW_{th})	Installed capacity (MW_{e})	Max. net exports (MW_{e})	Capacity factor	Notes
Reppie waste-to-energy plant	Addis Ababa	8.976°N 38.710°E	urban wastes, biomass	110	50	25	0.845	

===== Co-generation thermal =====
Cogeneration means that the electricity is generated by a captive power plant attached to a factory, typically a sugar factory in Ethiopia, and the electricity produced is consumed mainly by that factory, with only surplus power being supplied to the national grid. The largest of these power plants, however, is under construction and is considered to deliver both heat and electricity for the own use in an industrial park near Adi Gudem with up to 11 heavy industry factories. It is fully private (IPP), the electrical power will be delivered to the national grid through a power purchasing agreement (PPA).

ICS thermal plant	Location	Coordinates	Fuel	Installed capacity (MW_{e})	Own use (MW_{e})	Max. net exports (MW_{e})	Capacity factor	Status	Notes
Adi Gudem Industrial	Adi Gudem	13.241°N 39.558°E	gas (CCGT)	(500)	(135)	(365)		construction start in March 2019	IPP with PPA
Wonji-Shoa Sugar	Adama	8.454°N 39.230°E	bagasse	30	9	21			
Metehara Sugar	Metehara	8.834°N 39.922°E	bagasse	9	9	0			
Finchaa Sugar	Fincha	9.792°N 37.421°E	bagasse	30	18	12			
Kessem Sugar	Amibara	9.153°N 39.954°E	bagasse	26	10	16			
Tendaho Sugar	Asaita	11.550°N 41.389°E	bagasse	60	22	38			
Omo Kuraz I Sugar	Kuraz	6.290°N 35.053°E	bagasse	(45)	(16)	(29)		under construction	
Omo Kuraz II Sugar	Kuraz	6.126°N 35.999°E	bagasse	60	20	40			
Omo Kuraz III Sugar	Kuraz	6.126°N 35.999°E	bagasse	60	20	40			
Omo Kuraz V Sugar	Kuraz	6.126°N 35.999°E	bagasse	(120)	(40)	(80)		under construction	
Total						647			
Total operational						167			

The production of sugar and bioethanol from sugarcane leaves over biomass wastes: bagasse. The production of sugar and bioethanol requires thermal and electrical energy, both which is provided through the combustion of bagasse. The excess electrical power that is not needed for the production processes is then delivered to the national power grid. The Ethiopian sugar factories are state-owned and they are sometimes 'under construction' for many years and don't necessarily deliver sugar – or electricity. One example, the construction of Tendaho Sugar, started in 2005 and 12 years later its degree of completion stands at 27%. In addition, the sugarcane production remains low and so does the sugar and electricity production. At least the first three plants on the list (Wonji-Shoa Sugar, Metehara Sugar, Finchaa Sugar) are out of question, they are delivering sugar and electricity.

Bagasse is only available from October to May during and after the harvesting of sugarcane. Therefore, the operation of the plants (and their cogeneration facilities) is limited to these months. Given such conditions, the capacity factor of the plants has low chances to be above 0.5.

Under investigation is the use of biomass other than bagasse for electricity production in the campaign gap from May to October. A promising candidate is also the use of Devil's Tree for the Kessem sugar factory, an invasive species in the Amibara woreda of Afar region of Ethiopia. In addition, other thermal biomass power plants are planned to be constructed in Amibara woreda (close to the Kessem sugar factory) to make use of the Devil's Tree.

=== Non-renewable energies ===
==== Diesel ====
The list contains ICS power plants, with a sum of 98.8 MW_{e} of installed capacity. They are all powered by diesel fuel:

ICS power plant	Location	Coordinates	Capacity (MW_{e})	Capacity factor (2016/17)	operational since
Dire Dawa (mu)	Dire Dawa	9.627°N 41.803°E	3.6	0.002	1965
Dire Dawa	Dire Dawa	9.627°N 41.803°E	40	0.00	2004
Adwa	Adwa	14.152°N 38.873°E	3.0	0.00	1998
Axum	Axum	14.122°N 38.709°E	3.2	0.00	1975
Awash 7 Kilo	Awash	9.002°N 40.177°E	35	0.00	2003
Kaliti	Addis Ababa	8.886°N 38.756°E	14	0.00	2003
Total operational			98.8		

Diesel power generation costs up to 10 times more than hydropower and is only used in times of emergency or when no other option is available. In 2016/2017, the capacity factor was ~0.00, indicating that the power grid had enough reserves and did not require power generation from expensive diesel. Essentially, all diesel power plants were in stand-by mode only.

==== Others ====
There are no other power plants working with non-renewable fuels or fossil fuels.

Ethiopia has confirmed gaseous, liquid and solid hydrocarbon reserves (fossil fuels): natural gas of around eight trillion cubic feet, oil by 253 million tonnes of oil shales and more than 300 million tonnes of coal. Most countries on earth use such resources to generate electricity, but in Ethiopia, there are no plans to exploit them for energy generation. An 800 km pipeline from a gas field to Djibouti is being laid by a Chinese company in order to export Ethiopia's gas resources cheaply to China, but there are no plans to use these resource for the benefit of Ethiopia itself yet. In the case of coal, plans were made in 2006 to build a 100 MW coal power plant (the Yayu coal power plant) which would use coal and lignite from a nearby coal mine. The capacity of 100 MW is extremely small by international standards (2000–4000 MW being the norm), but still, an active environment lobby managed to sabotage the plans, with the backing of international NGOs. All plans had to be abandoned and the project was cancelled in September 2006. The expected environmental destruction was considered to be far too severe.

== Lists of SCS power plants ==
SCS power plants are dealt with within the Ethiopian regions or by private institutions and not the federal government anymore (last federal data were from 2015), which makes it somewhat challenging to list them. SCS power plants often make sense only in areas with no access to the national grid, because of the often higher total cost of electricity if compared to ICS power plants.

This is especially true for the smallest hydropower power plants, while hydropower power plants with an installed capacity beyond 1 MW_{e} might still be competitive. If the national grid is to enter the area of an SCS plant, the plant will possibly or even likely be shut down, closed and decommissioned. That can happen after just a few years of operation given the fast development in Ethiopia. The lifetime of small hydropower plants then amounts to years rather than decades. For the reason given, any listing of small hydropower SCS plants is something like a snapshot for the moment, here 2017.

On the other side, small SCS wind generators can be moved at any time to a new location, if the national grid approaches an area with small micro-grid wind farms. Such low-cost wind turbines can have a prolonged lifetime and can even be competitive with large-scale ICS power plants considering the total cost of electricity. Installation costs are low and they don't need costly infrastructure elements like water canals or diversion weirs.

=== Renewable energies ===
==== Hydropower ====
The list is certainly not complete.

SCS power plant	Location	River	Drainage basin	Type	Installed capacity (kW_{e})	Capacity factor (2016/17)	Operational since	Notes
Sor	8.398°N 35.44°E	Sor River	Nile	run-of-river	5,000	0.49	1990	largest SCS
Dembi	south of Tepi village	Gilo River	Nile	run-of-river	800		1991	rehabilitation after 2010
Yadot	Delo Menna woreda	Yadot River	Jubba	run-of-river	350		1990	
Hagara Sodicha	Aleto Wendo woreda	Lalta River	Rift Valley	weir	55		2011	
Gobecho I + II	Bona woreda	Gange River	Rift Valley	weir	41		2010/11	
Ererte	Bona woreda	Ererte River	Rift Valley	weir	33		2010	
Leku	Shebe Senbo woreda	Boru River	Nile	weir	20		2016	
Total operational					6,299			

The listed SCS power plants have a total capacity of 6.3 ME_{e}. An extension of the "Sor" power plant, the "Sor 2" power plant with another 5 ME_{e} might be under construction, but the status of that project is not known.

first six wind turbines / generators (with battery buffer) were initiated, built and provided in 2016 by the Ethio Resource Group, a privately owned company, that made a power purchasing agreement with the Ethiopian government. Each turbine services another village and its own micro-grid, there are no connections between the micro-grids and between the turbines.

Location	Turbines	Installed capacity (kW_{e}) [per turbine]	Installed capacity (kW_{e}) [per grid]	Installed capacity (kW_{e}) [total]	Operational since	Notes
Menz Gera Midir	6	1.6	1.6	9.6	2016	Ethiopia's first SCS wind units

==== Solar ====
There are around 40,000 small off-grid Solar Home Stations mainly for households delivering between 25 and 100 W each. For 2020 it is planned to have 400,000 of them. In addition, a large amount of solar lanterns are in operation, up to 3,600,000 are planned for 2020 for providing lighting in places in need for it. A double-digit number of private initiatives in Ethiopia is funded with US$100,000 each through the Power Africa and The Off-Grid Energy Challenge of the U.S. African Development Foundation. The single largest one is a 12 kW solar installation.

Remarkable is a hybrid photovoltaics system buffered by a battery which allows to deliver 160 kW. This system is built for Wolisso Hospital, one of the largest hospitals in Ethiopia to have an always reliable source of electrical power at a rated voltage due to its high-level medicine infrastructure and sensitive instruments and other equipment.

SCS solar station	Location	Coordinates	Installed capacity (kW_{ac})	Capacity factor	Operational since	Notes
Wolisso Hospital Solar Plant	Wolisso	8.545°N 37.978°E	160		2018	battery buffered

=== Non-renewable energies ===
==== Diesel ====
There are many small operational and active off-grid SCS Diesel systems with a sum of 20.65 MW of installed capacity throughout Ethiopia (Aug. 2017).

== Planned power plants until 2025 ==
=== Energy mix foreseen ===
Ethiopia is now aiming as much as possible at geothermal energy, in contrast to the years before 2015, when the country focused almost exclusively on hydropower. Power plants with geothermal energy usually have a high and constant power output with high capacity factors which makes this kind of energy highly competitive in the long term. Also, geothermal energy can be used for baseload power plants. Geothermal energy is unlimited and always available, which is not always the case for hydropower (in times of drought, for example). Hydropower is still much cheaper and has the largest share in Ethiopian plans.

Ethiopia with its quickly increasing electricity demand of over 30% requires new power plants, immediately. However, the construction of new power plants is incredibly slow; in 2015 only 3.9% of the energy target (energy from new power plants) had been achieved for the timeframe from 2010 to 2015 due to lack of public financing. Ethiopia learned its lesson and is now seeking financing from private investors. These investors should build and also operate power plants for 25 years as Independent Power Producers (IPP), each equipped with a Power Purchasing Agreement (PPA).

Therefore, Ethiopia is now experimenting with public-private partnerships with IPPs for the construction of most if not all power plants. This happens in the hope to have many power plants being constructed simultaneously, something, Ethiopia cannot do due to its own limited financial resources. This also means that the original Ethiopian plans dealing with a priority order of power plants to be constructed until 2025 or 2037 is dead, as the free market has its own priority order.

Regarding suitable sites for generating electricity, Ethiopia did a lot of exploration in recent years, including determining the expected levelized cost of electricity (LCOE) for each site, electricity source and power plant including the construction of necessary power transmission lines, auxiliary infrastructures like access roads, etc. The LCOE values also depend on a multitude of broader conditions like the capacity factor, the assumed lifetime of a power plant and other broader conditions often being country-specific (which are not provided here). In some cases, the costs for power transmission lines make up to $0.02 /kWh of the provided LCOE. Power transmission losses account for up to $0.007 /kWh. The LCOE given in all tables below therefore cannot be directly compared to that of other countries in Africa and of the World in general.

The LCOE and LCOE ranges provided below are given in US$ values as of 2012 and were determined in 2013–2015. They reflect the state-of-the-art of 2012 and do not account for technology breakthroughs in the meantime:

	Hydropower	Geothermal energy	Wind farms	Solar parks	Co-generation with biomass	Combined cycle gas turbines (CCGT)	Gas turbines	Diesel	Waste-to-energy
Projected additional Capacity [MW]	9,893	3,412	1,500	700	420	420	0	0	0
LCOE [$/kWh]	0.02–0.11	0.05–0.11	0.08–0.11	0.12	0.11–0.12	0.11	0.135	0.21	0.245
Capacity factor	0.2–0.92	0.9	0.26–0.34	0.2–0.3	0.2–0.3	0.88	0.9	0.84	0.85

The list above does show the expected installed capacity (in MW_{e}) for the LCOE ranges given for the year 2025. In general, Ethiopia targets LCOE of around 0.08 $/kWh and below to stay competitive in the future. A few exceptions are about to happen in particular in eastern Ethiopia (no hydropower, no geothermal energy, substantial losses through long-distance power transmission), where CCGT and wind power remains competitive. This explains in part the planned energy mix shown.

As IPP's should take over starting with 2017, surprises can happen. For example, high LCOE sites for geothermal power generation might become low LCOE sites in the near future, as there is an innovation cycle resulting in reduced costs. This is not reflected by the table above. Accordingly, the installed capacity in 2025 might be higher for geothermal energy than expected. A similar trend is observable for wind power and photovoltaics, so there might be a number of wind power sites in 2025 with an LCOE below 0.09 $/kWh. In the US and in the timeframe of 2010–2017, the LCOE for solar photovoltaics was reduced by 81%, wind power saw a reduction of 63% and CCGT a reduction of 31%.

The following distribution among public and private investors is planned, with IPP constructing and operating the power plants for 20–25 years through PPA:

	Hydropower	Geothermal energy	Wind farms	Solar parks	Co-generation with biomass	Combined cycle gas turbines (CCGT)
Private (IPP)	50%	100%	70%	100%	70%	???
Public (EEP)	50%	0	30%	0	30%	???

=== Candidate power plants ===
The table below shows candidate power plants for construction, ordered for their LCOE (based on 2012 values). The general terms outlined in the chapter above for LCOE values apply for this listing as well. Power plants under construction or in project implementation phase are not shown, only the planned ones.

Most entries came from the Ethiopian Power System Expansion Master Plan Study, EEP 2014 and the Ethiopian Geothermal Power System Master Plan, JICA 2015. A low number of refinements arrived from published tenders (as for the Upper Dabus power plant) and from feasibility studies that arrived after 2014 (as for the TAMS hydropower plant). For the solar power plants, also documents from the Scaling Solar initiative of the World Bank have been used.

Candidate power plant	Location	Coordinates	Type	Drainage basin	Capacity (MW_{e})	Capacity factor	LCOE ($/kWh)	Specifics
Melka Sedi	Amibara	9.237°N 40.135°E	biomass		137	0.9		input: mesquite + bagasse
Bameza	Guba, near GERD	11.222°N 35.082°E	biomass		120	0.25	0.114	input: wood
Wabi	Wabe River	8.236°N 37.727°E	hydro	Turkana Basin	100–150			feasibility study in 2018
Beko Abo	Blue Nile River	10.365°N 36.571°E	hydro	Nile	935	0.81	0.026	live storage: 1.2 km^{3}
Genji	Baro River	8.157°N 35.149°E	hydro	Nile	216	0.49	0.029	diversion weir
Upper Mendaya	Blue Nile River	10.011°N 35.839°E	hydro	Nile	1,700	0.57	0.038	live storage: 10.3 km^{3}
Karadobi	Blue Nile River	9.894°N 37.839°E	hydro	Nile	1,600	0.56	0.044	live storage: 18.7 km^{3}
Geba I+II	Geba River	8.211°N 36.073°E	hydro	Nile	385	0.55	0.045	live storage: 1.7 km^{3}
Sor II	Sor River	8.398°N 35.44°E	hydro	Nile	5	0.92	0.058	live storage: 0.3 km^{3}
Upper Dabus I+II	Dabus River	9.934°N 34.895°E	hydro	Nile	798	0.51	0.058	live storage: 2.6 km^{3}
Tendaho II-IV	Dubti	11.75°N 41.09°E	geothermal		555	0.90	0.059	T >240 °C steam
Aluto III+IV	Aluto	7.789°N 38.794°E	geothermal		160	0.90	0.059	T >240 °C steam
Birbir I+II	Birbir River	8.543°N 35.195°E	hydro	Nile	564	0.70	0.059	live storage: 2.5 km^{3}
Corbetti II-III	Shashamane	7.18°N 38.44°E	geothermal		500	0.90	0.059	T >210 °C steam
Halele Werabesa	River Gibe	8.381°N 37.391°E	hydro	Turkana Basin	424	0.54	0.061	live storage: 5.7 km^{3}
Chemoga Yeda I+II	Debre Markos	10.286°N 37.727°E	hydro	Nile	280	0.45	0.067	live storage: 0.5 km^{3}
Genale Dawa V	River Genale	5.395°N 40.438°E	hydro	Jubba	146	0.66	0.067	live storage: 0.1 km^{3}
Abaya	Middle Bilate River	6.821°N 38.072°E	geothermal		790	0.90	0.071	T >210 °C steam
Boseti	near Kone	8.780°N 39.829°E	geothermal		265	0.90	0.072	T >210 °C steam
TAMS	Baro River	8.209°N 34.932°E	hydro	Nile	1,700	0.39	0.073	live storage: 4.8 km^{3}
Meteka	Meteka	9.867°N 40.517°E	geothermal		130	0.90	0.073	T >210 °C steam
Dofan	Dulecha	9.35°N 40.13°E	geothermal		86	0.90	0.078	T >210 °C steam
Baro I+II	Baro River	8.131°N 35.221°E	hydro	Nile	645	0.46	0.083	live storage: 1.0 km^{3}
Lower Didessa	Didessa River	9.479°N 35.970°E	hydro	Nile	550	0.20	0.083	live storage: 3.5 km^{3}
Tekeze II	Tekeze River	13.867°N 37.908°E	hydro	Nile	450	0.69	0.084	live storage: 6.6 km^{3}
Ayisha III-IV	Ayisha	10.754°N 42.585°E	wind		300	0.34	0.09	
Iteya	Iteya	8.241°N 39.126°E	wind		600	0.32	0.09	overlap with Assela and Tulu Moye areas
Mega Maji	Mega	4.230°N 37.995°E	wind		100	0.34	0.095	
Debre Berhan	Debre Berhan	9.898°N 37.722°E	wind		200	0.3	0.095	
Sululta	Sululta	9.241°N 38.845°E	wind		100	0.26	0.095	
Dila	Dila	5.854°N 38.265°E	wind		100	0.3	0.1	
Assela	Assela	7.942°N 39.242°E	wind		100	0.28	0.1	overlap with Iteya and Tulu Moye areas
Tulu Moye II-IV	Arsi Zone	8.159°N 39.137°E	geothermal		470	0.90	0.104	T ≥170 °C steam
Teo	Afar Zone 3	11.089°N 40.792°E	geothermal		9	0.90	0.104	T >210 °C steam
Fantale	Mount Fentale	8.967°N 39.9°E	geothermal		120	0.90	0.105	T ≥170 °C steam
Dallol	Dallol volcano	14.242°N 40.3°E	geothermal		44	0.90	0.108	T >210 °C steam
Dama Ali	Mount Dama Ali	11.283°N 41.633°E	geothermal		230	0.90	0.108	T ≥170 °C steam
Calub	Calub gas field	6.210°N 44.645°E	CCGT		420	0.88	0.109	domestic natural gas
Nazareth	Adama	8.503°N 39.323°E	geothermal		33	0.90	0.109	T ≥170 °C steam
Boina	Alamata	13.0°N 40.15°E	geothermal		100	0.90	0.111	T ≥170 °C steam
Mek'ele	Mek'ele	13.498°N 39.504°E	solar		100	0.2	0.12	
Humera	Humera	14.284°N 36.620°E	solar		100	0.2	0.12	
Gad	Gad	9.96°N 41.93°E	solar		125	0.2	0.12	Scaling Solar Phase I
Hurso	Hurso	9.612°N 41.536°E	solar		125	0.2	0.12	Scaling Solar Phase II (proposed)
Dicheto	NW of Galafi	11.808°N 41.721°E	solar		125	0.2	0.12	Scaling Solar Phase I
Metema	Metemma	12.952°N 36.173°E	solar		125	0.2	0.12	Scaling Solar Phase II (proposed)
Weranso	Weranso	11.302°N 40.528°E	solar		150	0.2	0.12	
Welenchiti	Welenchiti	8.639°N 39.445°E	solar		150	0.2	0.12	
Gojeb	Gojeb River	7.237°N 36.854°E	hydro	Turkana Basin	150	0.48	0.127	live storage: 1.0 km^{3}
Aleltu East	Aleltu River	9.762°N 38.971°E	hydro	Nile	189	0.53	0.128	live storage: 0.6 km^{3}
Aleltu West	Aleltu River	9.756°N 38.954°E	hydro	Nile	265	0.46	0.149	live storage: 0.6 km^{3}
Wabi Shebele	Shebelle River	7.486°N 42.101°E	hydro	Shebelle	88	0.91	0.161	live storage: 3.3 km^{3}
Lower Dabus	Dabus River	9.985°N 34.889°E	hydro	Nile	250	0.29	0.177	live storage: 1.4 km^{3}
Total planned					18,617			
Total ≤$0.11 /kWh					15,201			
Total ≤$0.08 /kWh					11,257			

Some candidate hydropower plants on the list have a much higher LCOE than CCGT power plants, wind farms or solar farms. Usually this means that the affected candidate power plants are out of play. Nevertheless, they might still be considered for immediate construction as the LCOE does not account for any multipurpose use beyond electricity generation.

Some hydropower plants with high LCOE values are multipurpose plants. Some of these high LCOE hydropower plants provide flood control, others allow advanced irrigation schemes for better agriculture (up to several thousands of km^{2}) or they keep perennial and intermittent rivers navigable all year round.

== Cross border transfer of electricity ==
Ethiopia is a member of the East Africa Power Pool. The other members are Sudan, Burundi, DRC, Egypt, Kenya, Libya, Rwanda, Tanzania, and Uganda.

The Sodo–Moyale–Suswa High Voltage Power Line is being built between Sodo, Ethiopia and Suswa, Kenya.

== See also ==
- Lists
  - List of power stations in Africa
  - List of largest power stations in the world
- Further information
  - Energy in Ethiopia
  - Dams and reservoirs in Ethiopia
  - Renewable energy in Ethiopia
