= Hadele Ele =

District of Afar Ethiopia

Coordinates: 10°20′N 40°15′E

Hadale'ela Afar, Ethiopia is one of the woredas in the Afar Region of Ethiopia. Part of the Administrative Zone 5, Hadale-Ela is located near the base of the eastern escarpment of the Ethiopian Highlands, and bordered on the south by Simurobi Gele'alo, on the west by the Amhara Region, on the north by Dalifage, on the northeast by the Borkana River which separates it from Dewe, and on the east by Administrative Zone 3. Information is lacking on the towns of this woreda.

== Demographics ==
Based on the 2007 Census conducted by the Central Statistical Agency of Ethiopia (CSA), this woreda has a total population of 35,255, of whom 19,467 are men and 15,788 women. While 2,119 or 6.01% are urban inhabitants, a further 5,951 or 16.89% are pastoralists. 99.41% of the population said they were Muslim. Although the predominant ethnic group in this woreda are the Afar, there is a significant Argobba minority.
