= Renewable energy in Ethiopia =

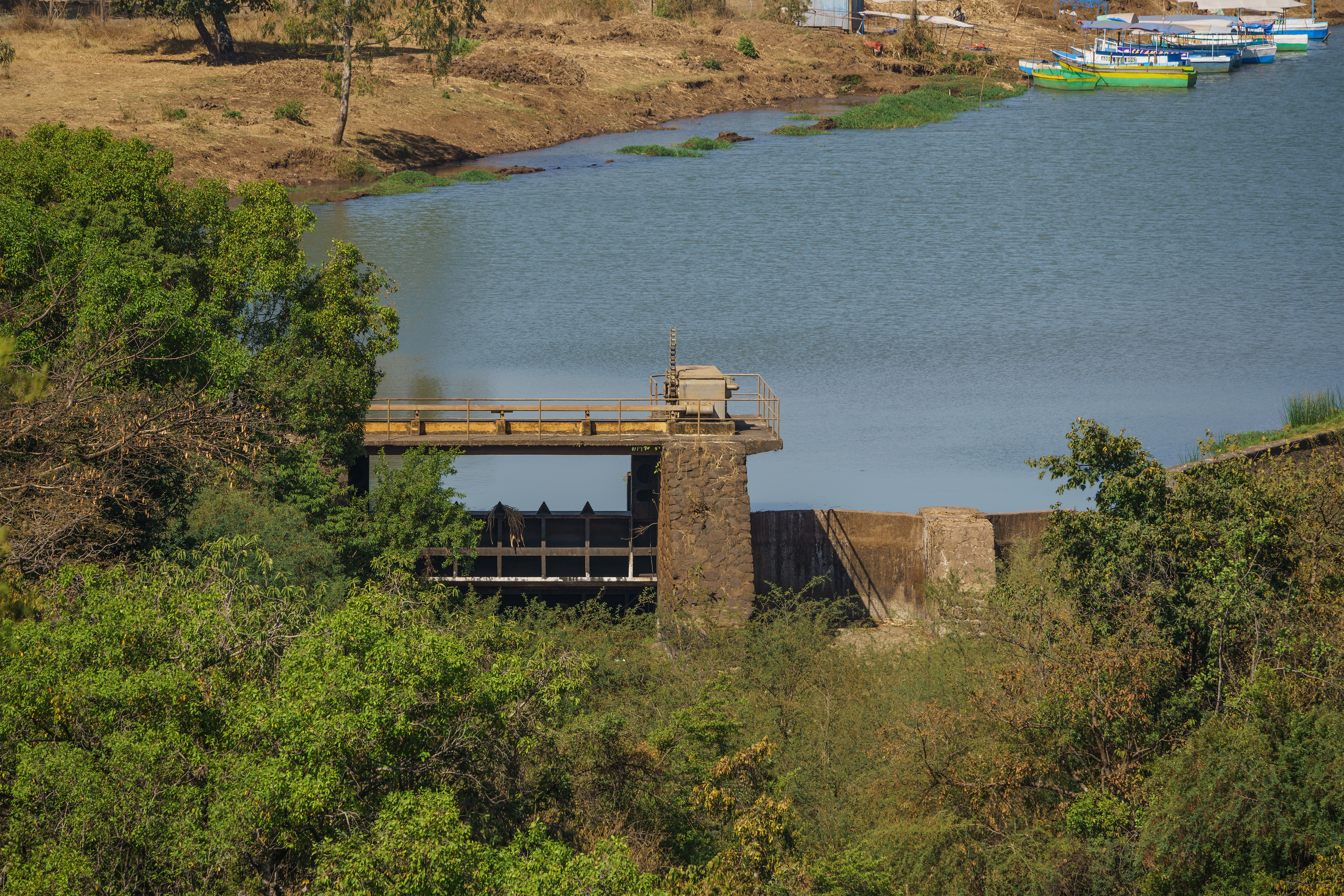
Dam of a hydroelectric power plant near the Blue Nile Falls

Ethiopia generates most of its electricity from renewable energy, mainly hydropower. The country is strategically expanding its energy sector, aiming for a more diverse and resilient mix. Currently, Ethiopia's energy production is heavily reliant on hydropower, which constitutes about 90% of its generated electricity but is vulnerable to climate-induced droughts. To address this, the government is implementing key hydropower, geothermal, wind, and solar projects.

Ethiopia's renewable energy portfolio is broad and includes significant hydroelectric capacity, along with wind, solar and geothermal power. This is a source of renewable energy that the country can generate on over 60,000 megawatts (MW). To accelerate energy sector development, the Ethiopian government launched initiatives such as the Scaling Solar program, and the already operational Grand Ethiopian Renaissance Dam (GERD), with an installed capacity of 1,550 MW, demonstrating its efforts in this direction.

Under the Nationally Determined Contributions (NDCs) to the Paris Agreement, Ethiopia aims to achieve carbon neutrality by 2025, with a target of reducing greenhouse gas emissions by 68.8%. Meanwhile, Ethiopia has yet to achieve its target of carbon neutrality, and the country is balancing the transition to renewable energy sources with efforts to address energy poverty and promote economic growth.

== Electricity supply ==
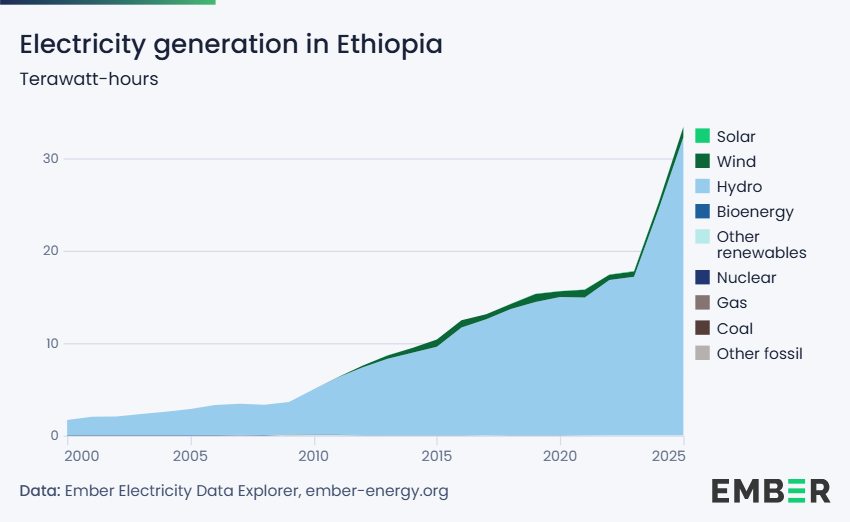
Electricity generation in Ethiopia in terawatt-hours

In 2011, over 96% of Ethiopia's electricity was generated from hydropower. The country began a large program to expand electricity supply in the 2010s from 2,000 MW to 10,000 MW. This was to be done mainly with renewable sources. Wind and geothermal were included to offset seasonal differences in water levels. Ethiopia plans to export electricity to neighboring countries but the plan is contingent upon transmission lines being upgraded and expanded.

Most of the energy needs of Ethiopia are filled by biofuels for cooking, heating, and off-grid lighting. Petroleum, including gasoline, diesel and kerosene supply less than 7% of the country's energy supply. Solar photovoltaics is being promoted to replace fuel-based lighting and off-grid electrical supply with a solar panel assembly plant opening in Addis Ababa in early 2013. The majority of Ethiopia's population live in rural areas and very few have access to electricity.

Ethiopia hasn't reached its carbon neutrality goal currently, the nation is balancing between the switch to renewable energy sources and ongoing initiatives to combat energy poverty as well as advancing economic growth.

This aim was set through their ambitious three-stage Growth and Transformation Plan, Ethiopia seeks to transform itself into a modern economy by 2025. According to the Ministry of Water and Energy, as of 2018, only 23% of the national populace has access to grid electricity. That figure falls even further to 10% when moving to rural areas – a figure that's smaller than the 17% average found across the rest of Africa. Drought frequency, flooding, poor land management techniques, and a rapidly growing population all have increased the situations direness. As of 2018, Ethiopia had launched the National Electrification Program which aimed for 65% of the population to be grid-connected by 2025.

== Hydropower ==
Hydropower Dams built in Ethiopia provided over 1,500 MW of capacity by 2010. The four largest dams were built between 2004 and 2010. Gilgel Gibe III added 1,870 MW in 2016.

The Grand Ethiopia Renaissance Dam (GERD), a key element of the country's energy expansion strategy, is expected to significantly increase the nation's energy capacity. With a planned capacity of 5,150 MW, GERD was 90% complete as of March 2023 and began producing 375 MW from one turbine in February 2022. This project is not solely focused on energy generation; it is also regarded as a potential contributor to industrialization and economic growth, with possibilities for electricity exports. Complementing GERD is the Koysha Hydropower Dam, which, once operational, will be the second-largest dam in Ethiopia with a capacity of 2,170 MW.

Over 70% of the freshwater resources that Ethiopia has access to can be found at the Blue Nile River Basin. Here, three river systems, the Abbay (44%), Akobo River (20%), and Tekezé (6%) provide the country with vital water resources. Ethiopia's government is planning on tapping into this technology five-fold in the coming years.

Egypt has expressed concerns that their water rights are being violated by these upstream dams but Ethiopia has no water treaty with Egypt.

== Wind power ==
Ethiopia plans 800 MW of wind power. As the dry season is also the windy season, wind power is a good complement to hydropower. Ethiopia has benefitted from the creation and sustainment of two large wind power systems. In October 2013 the largest wind farm on the continent, the Adama plants, started capturing energy in Ethiopia. The Adama 1 plant has a capacity to produce 51 MW while the Adama 2 plant has a capacity to generate 51 MW. Another farm of note is the Ashegoda wind farm and the Ashegoda Expansion wind farm which together produce roughly 120 MW of electricity. The Chinese firm Hydrochina estimated total wind power potential to be as high as 1.3 million MW.

== Solar Power ==
Afar region in Ethiopia.

Ethiopia has ample solar energy potential and is one of the most solar-rich places in Africa, with an average total daily solar radiation of 5-7 kWh/m². But their growth has been tightly limited by the high upfront costs involved in producing and installing solar panels. Establishing solar projects which requires an initial investment of one to two million dollars per megawatt, proposing a financial challenge on a developing nation such as Ethiopia.

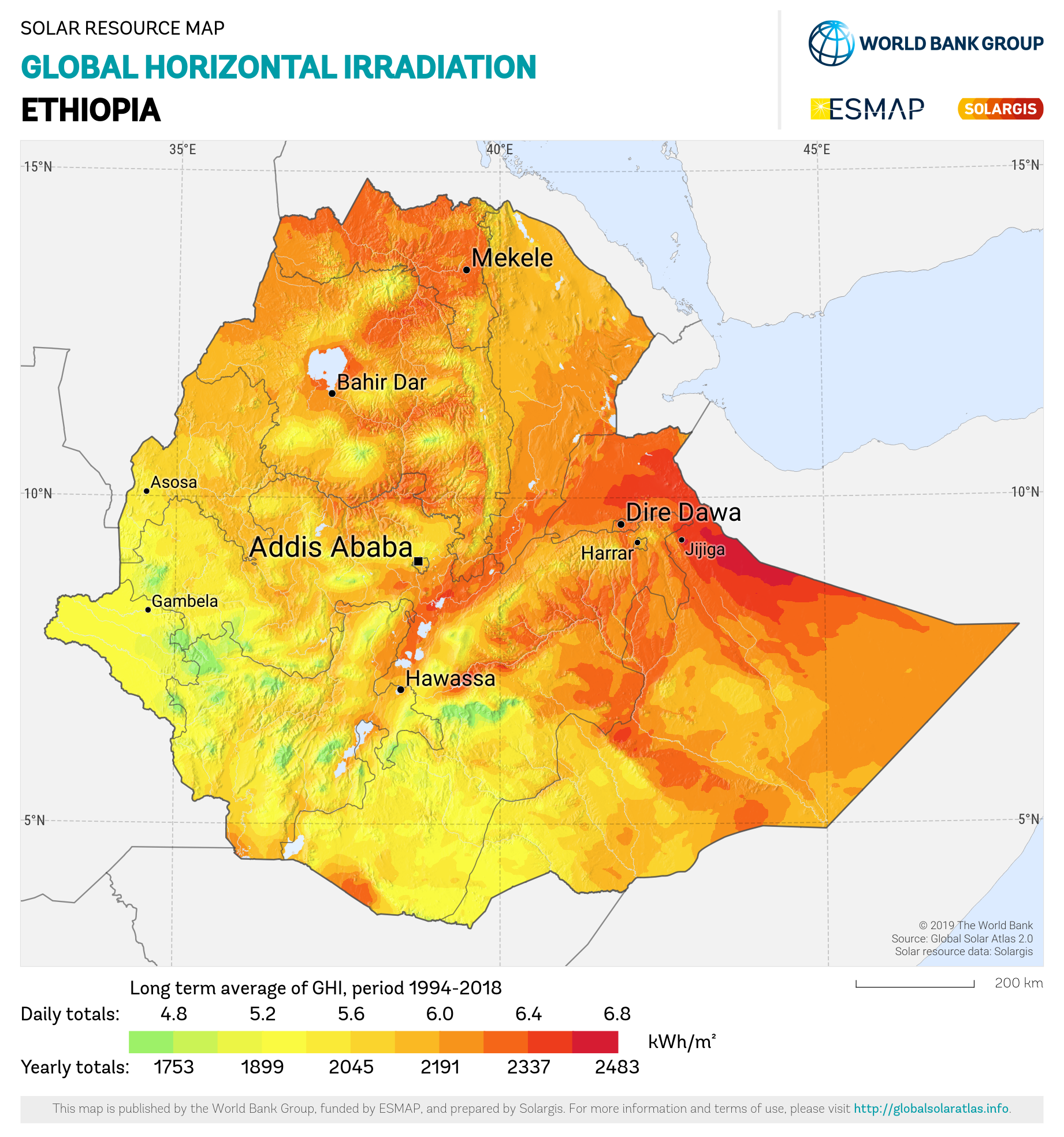
Solar potential in Ethiopia.

So, the Ethiopian government initiated the Scaling Solar program, supported by the World Bank to build 250 MW of solar photovoltaic (PV) infrastructure in the Afar region. Ethiopia is carrying out this initiative as an aspect of its plan to decrease its reliance on hydropower that are susceptible to drought and increase its capacity for sustainable energy. Construction and supply chain logistics faced delays from the COVID-19 pandemic, but the country claims the project remains a top priority, especially for rural electricity.

Solar energy is replacing off-grid power and fuel based lighting in remote areas with limited access to the national grid. For example, 71 percent of urban families have access to electricity, but only 10 percent of rural households. In 2013, a solar panel assembly plant capable of producing 10 MW of solar panels annually was established in Addis Ababa to support these efforts. Along with backing local solar energy efforts, this factory creates jobs and advances this specific technical expertise in the country. Ethiopia's approach is matching with the country's Climate-Resilient Green Economy (CRGE) plan, which intends to have carbon neutrality through adopting renewble energy.

== Geothermal ==
Ethiopia has planned to build geothermal plants to offset restraints on power production by hydroelectric plants due to seasonal water variation. In 2013, the American-Icelandic company Reykjavik Geothermal signed an agreement to develop a 1,000 MW geothermal farm, though the initial 500 MW phase was not completed by its 2018 target.

As part of Ethiopia's strategic expansion of its energy sector, the country is also developing geothermal projects in Oromia, specifically in Corbetti and Tulu Moye. These projects, revised in 2017 to a capacity of 150 MW each, were finalized in March 2020. Representing an investment of approximately $1.2 billion, the geothermal projects demonstrate Ethiopia's commitment to renewable energy development. They contribute not only to the country's energy sustainability but also open opportunities for future investments, particularly from U.S. Independent Power Producers (IPP).

A study funded by the Climate and Development Knowledge Network found that the Ethiopian approach to geothermal development puts little focus on involving the private sector in risk mitigation and fails to build the capacity needed for flows of significant private sector finance. The study found that international, multilateral and bilateral institutions should:

- Support technical assistance and capacity building, which takes into account the needs of all relevant stakeholders involved within specific country and market contexts.
- Provide targeted concessional finance by taking into account all possible risk mitigation instruments during project development, and by envisioning the leverage of private finance as early as possible.
- Use insurance instruments to target specific, well defined risks: this can offer very high leverage ratios on the use of public funds, and crowd in private sector insurance capital.

== Biofuels ==
Over 91% of the primary energy supply in Ethiopia is coming from biomass as of 2015 (45.8 out of 49.9 MTOE). Additionally, in the final sectors of Ethiopian society more than 90% of the energy is coming from biomass and of that 99% is consumed by direct residencies. Often coming in the form of animal product and forestry, natural resources, biomass as a renewable energy source is utilized extensively by direct residences and the final sector. Over time Ethiopia's forests have shrunk from covering 35% of the country at the turn of the twentieth century to under 15% currently. This loss can primarily be attributed to population growth. The country's developed a strategy it calls the Woody Biomass Inventory and Strategic Planning Project to attempt to combat the noticeable degradation of vegetation cover and address resource shortages for future industrial and energy needs. As of 2008, 85% of Ethiopia's population almost exclusively relied on two types of biomass fuels for cooking: woody biomass and dung. Such a reliance on biomass backed fuels has been linked to the over 72,400 indoor air pollution caused deaths that occur annually in Ethiopia. The government plans to distribute 9 million more efficient stoves by 2015 to reduce wood use while improving air quality and lowering CO_{2} emissions.

== Exports ==
As Ethiopia produces more power than it consumes, it has become a regional power exporter. In 2015, it sells electricity to Kenya, Sudan and Djibouti and has future contracts for power sales to Tanzania, Rwanda, South Sudan and Yemen. The Eastern African Power Pool will expand transmission lines to make this possible. Exports to Egypt and Sudan are possible after the completion of the Grand Ethiopian Renaissance Dam.

== See also ==
- Energy in Ethiopia
- List of power stations in Ethiopia
