= Aluto–Langano Geothermal Power Station =

Geothermal power station in Ethiopia

- Country: Ethiopia
- Location: Aluto-Langano, Oromia Region
- Coordinates: 07°47′19″N 38°47′41″E
- Construction began: 1986
- Commission date: 1998
- Owner: Government of Ethiopia
- Operator: Ethiopian Electric Power (EEP)

Geothermal power station
- Type: Binary cycle
- Wells: 4 (plus 8 planned)
- Max. well depth: ~2,500 m
- Combined cycle?: Yes

Power generation
- Units operational: 1
- Units decommissioned: 1
- Nameplate capacity: 7.3 MW_{e} (1998); 70-75 MW_{e} planned
- Capacity factor: 0 (2018)

The Aluto–Langano Geothermal Power Station, also known as Aluto Langano Geothermal Power Station, is the only geothermal power station in Ethiopia.

== Location ==
The facility is located within the dormant Aluto volcano, a volcanic complex of the Ethiopian Rift valley trending NNW–SSE with several craters up to 1 km wide, between Lake Langano and Ziway. The site is approximately 219 kilometres (136 mi), by road, south of Addis Ababa, the largest city and capital of Ethiopia. The geographical coordinates of this power station in the Oromia Region are: 07°47'19.0"N, 38°47'41.0"E (Latitude:7.788611; Longitude:38.794722).

== Overview ==
The Aluto—Langano geothermal field at the dormant Aluto volcano covers an area of about 8 square kilometres (3 sq mi) and is considered to be capable of generating up to 100 megawatts (130,000 hp) of electricity. It features temperatures in excess of 300 °C in a high-temperature up-flow dome at a minimum subsurface depth of around 1,200 meters. The geothermal field and its characteristics like stratigraphy, geochemistry and hydrothermal behavior are relatively well explored.

The Aluto—Langano Geothermal Power Station (dubbed Aluto–Langano I) is the oldest geothermal power station in Ethiopia, established in 1998 with a nameplate capacity of 8.5 megawatts (11,400 hp) and a net power generation capacity of 7.3 megawatts (9,800 hp). In 1998, the power station was considered a pilot plant to explore the features of the Aluto–Langano geothermal field, it used four of the eight drilled wells. It was still the only geothermal power station in Ethiopia 20 years later.

Two small wells (LA-3 & LA-6) deliver high pressure high temperature steam from areas of high temperatures in excess of 300 °C to a conventional combined cycle steam turbine, while the non-condensed exhaust steam and mid-temperature mid-pressure steam from two other small wells (LA-4 & LA-8) drive a bottoming combined cycle steam turbine. Both turbines were considered to deliver around 3.6 megawatts (4,800 hp) each. A re-injection well (LA-7) exists as well.

Several events (in particular corrosion, but also hydrothermal blockages, leakages, lack of operation knowledge of the plant personnel) led to several drops in the power generation capabilities several times between 1998 and 2018, followed by extensive repairs and rehabilitation works addressing in particular corrosion damages. The pilot power plant was out of operation for most of its existence. For most of the operating time, only the conventional combined cycle unit was operational (with only the two wells LA-3 & LA-6 operating). In 2018, the Aluto—Langano Geothermal Power Station was able to generate less than 1 megawatt (1,300 hp) of electric power and is essentially mothballed.

Expansion / replacement works (dubbed Aluto—Langano II) started in 2013 and delivered two more high-temperature wells in excess of 300 °C (LA-9D & LA-10D). Future works (from the viewpoint of 2018) are set to expand the total generating capacity of the geothermal field to ~75 megawatts (101,000 hp) by re-using the existing wells and by drilling another 8 large production-ready wells. New power generating units, which are able to withstand the corrosive steam, have to be installed as well.

The Aluto—Langano Geothermal Power Station is one of three grid-ready geothermal power stations in the country in different phases of operation or construction, the other two are the ~500 megawatts (670,000 hp) Corbetti Geothermal Power Station (exploration phase) and the Tulu Moye Geothermal Power Station (exploration phase), also with a capacity of ~500 megawatts.

== History ==
First exploration works started in 1981. The feasibility studies for this power station were conducted in 1986. The report concluded that the area could support a commercially viable geothermal power station. In 1998, a 8.5 megawatts (11,400 hp) geothermal power station was erected to prove the production ability of the geothermal field, with 7.3 MW_{e} net capacity.

One of the two power generation turbines went out of operation already in December 1999, the second one stopped working in 2001. Rehabilitation works put the conventional combined cycle steam turbine back into operation by 2007 and the bottoming combined cycle steam turbine back into operation in 2009, but the effective power generation capacity of both turbines was reduced to ~ 5 MW_{e}. Ageing contributed to a decrease of power output again and in 2018, less than 1 MW_{e} was generated. The second turbine is essentially decommissioned and the power plant almost out-of-operation.

Currently, the Ethiopian Ministry of Mines & Energy is in the process of expanding the plant. The International Development Association has committed to lend US$126 million of the projected total cost of US$218 million. In March 2018, the EEP advertised for a contractor for the project. The selected company is expected to provide two geothermal drilling rigs and accessories, rig operations and maintenance for drilling geothermal wells along with all the accessories, heavy machinery, trucks and vehicles. In February 2019, EPP contracted Kenya Electricity Generating Company to drill steam wells.

== Ownership ==
Aluto—Langano Power Station is owned by Ethiopia Electric Power (EEP), the national electricity monopoly.

== See also ==
- List of power stations in Ethiopia
- Geothermal power in Ethiopia
