= Dofan =

Rhyolitic shield volcano in Ethiopia

- Dofen
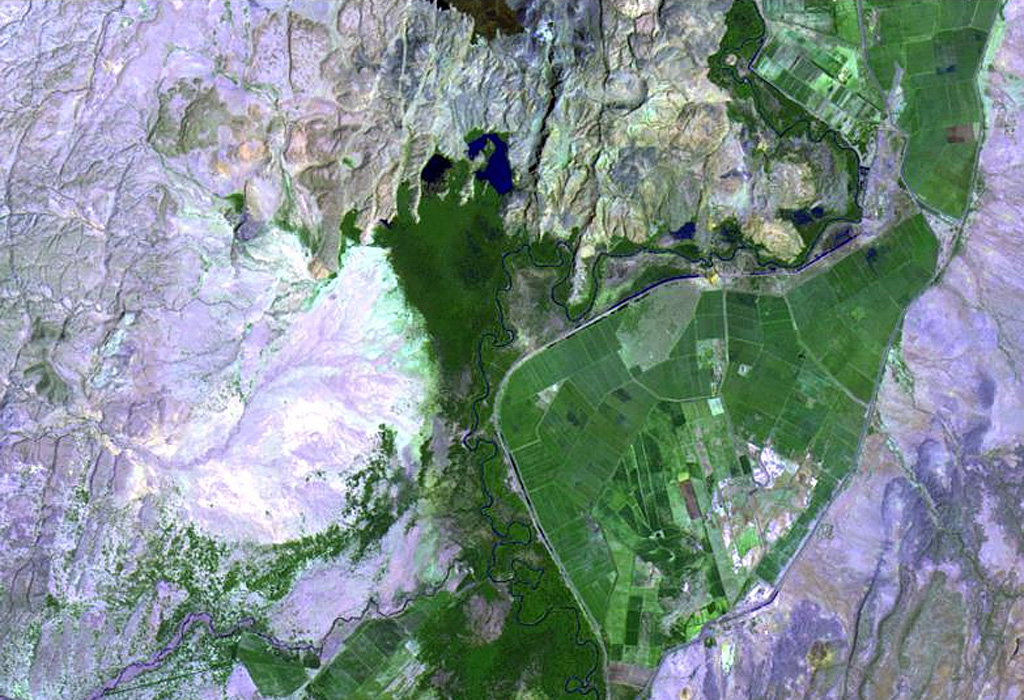

Highest point
- Elevation: 1,151 m (3,776 ft)
- Listing: List of volcanoes in Ethiopia
- Coordinates: 9°21′N 40°08′E

Geography
- Location within Ethiopia
- Location: Ethiopia

Geology
- Mountain type: Shield volcano
- Volcanic zone: Main Ethiopian Rift
- Last eruption: Holocene

Dofan or Dofen is a 1,151 m (3,776 ft) high rhyolitic shield volcano in Ethiopia's Awash National Park. The volcano rises 450 m (1,480 ft) above the valley floor. A north–south zone of cinder cones extending 10 km (6.2 mi); the cones in the north show intense fumarolic activity. Along the southern flank crater, a fumarole produced significant sulfur. The volcano's last eruptions were during the Holocene. On 2 January 2025, smoke emitted from the volcano, prompting tens of thousands of residents living in the area to evacuate. The Ethiopian Geological Institute reported steam and debris expelled from the volcano. However, the Ethiopian Disaster Risk Management Commission did not confirm the eruption. The activity comes amid an earthquake swarm that lasted several weeks.
