= 2024–25 Ethiopian earthquakes =

- Location within Ethiopia
- UTC time: 2025-02-14 20:28:23
- ISC event: 642883420
- USGS-ANSS: ComCat
- Local date: 27 September 2024 – 31 March 2025
- Local time: 23:28 EAT (UTC+3)
- Magnitude: M_{w} 5.9 (strongest tremor)
- Depth: 10 km (6 mi)
- Epicenter: Mount Fentale; 8.956°N 39.934°E (strongest tremor)
- Fault: East African Rift
- Type: Reverse (strongest tremor)
- Areas affected: Mainly Oromia and Afar Regions, Ethiopia
- Total damage: Severe
- Max. intensity: MMI IX (Violent)
- Casualties: 2 fatalities, several injuries

Starting late September 2024 and ending in late March 2025, central Ethiopia experienced 330 earthquakes, most of which were located in the Awash Fentale region, between or around the volcanoes of Mount Fentale and Dofan, in Ethiopia's Awash National Park. The earthquakes were widely felt across much of central Ethiopia, with many of them causing localized but severe damage.

== Timeline ==
From 27 September to 2 November 2024, an earthquake swarm consisting of 17 earthquakes above M_{w}4.0 occurred in the Awash Fentale area of the Afar Region. Shaking from these earthquakes was felt across much of the Oromia Region, causing widespread concern. The epicenter of the strongest earthquake, which measured M_{w}5.2, was about 28 km (17 mi) northeast of Awash, and the depth of the event was approximately 10 km (6 miles). Shaking was felt across central Ethiopia.

On 13 October, a M_{w}4.6 quake struck Oromia at around 07:37 local time. The shaking was felt throughout central and eastern Ethiopia, including the capital Addis Ababa, southern Afar, southern Amhara, central Oromia and northwestern Somali Regions. On 16 October, a 4.8 magnitude earthquake occurred at 11:11 PM local time, which had an epicentre in the Metehara area of Oromia. The German Research Centre for Geosciences (GFZ) was the first to detail the seismic event, providing crucial data for understanding its effects. According to initial reports, residents near the epicenter felt the quake, though it caused minimal damage. Further large earthquakes continued through December 2024.

From 21 December 2024 to 31 March 2025, a second swarm occurred, consisting of 314 earthquakes exceeding M_{w} 4.0. Most of these earthquakes were located around Mount Fentale. On 3 January 2025, signs of volcanic activity including steam emissions, were reported from the region around Dofan volcano, prompting authorities to move some residents to temporary shelters. The Ethiopian Geological Institute posted a video on their official Facebook page showing a steam plume emerging from a volcano in Awash Fentale. A M_{w}5.7 event struck 54 km (34 mi) north of Awash at a depth of 8 km (5.0 mi) on 4 January.

After multiple weeks of activity slowing down, a M_{w}5.9 earthquake, the largest of the swarm, struck 4 km (2.5 mi) north of Metehara on 14 February. It is also the largest earthquake to strike Ethiopia since 1989, and the largest recorded tremor in the Oromia region since 1944.

== Impact ==
The M_{w} 5.2 earthquake on 6 October destroyed several houses, damaged two others, a mosque and a school, and caused ground cracks in the Awash Fentale area. Due to the second swarm, two people were killed, several were slightly injured, over 50 homes, 24 schools and shops were destroyed, thousands of houses, a sugar factory, many office buildings, 27 schools and a road were damaged, and ground cracks were reported in the Awash Fentale-Dulecha area. About 99,000 people in Afar, Oromia and Amahara regions were affected.

== Response ==
Public officials responded by shutting down transportation infrastructure in the zone nearest the epicentre to investigate the damage caused by the October 6 shock. On 6 January 2025, it was reported that a task force had been established to assess the seismic risk to Addis Ababa. Experts from Addis Ababa University's Institute of Geophysics, Space Science, and Astronomy (IGSSA) and the Geological Survey of Ethiopia reported that the tremors felt in Addis Ababa were all due to the ongoing earthquake sequence in Awash Fentale, Dulecha and Oromia Fentale districts. Reports of these seismic and volcanic events were being monitored by the Global Disaster Alert and Coordination System. The government reported the evacuation of 80,000 residents and said authorities were monitoring the seismic activity and its possible connections with Mount Dofan.

== See also ==
- List of earthquakes in 2024
- List of earthquakes in 2025
- List of earthquakes in Ethiopia
