= Simurobi Gele'alo =

Coordinates: 10°00′N 40°10′E

Simurobi Gele'alo is one of the Districts of Ethiopia, or woredas, in the Afar Region of Ethiopia. Part of the Administrative Zone 5, Simurobi Gele'alo is located near the base of the eastern escarpment of the Ethiopian Highlands, and bordered on the west by the Amhara Region, on the north by Hadele Ele, and on the east and south by the Administrative Zone 3; the Awash River defines a part of the southern end of the eastern boundary of this woreda with Administrative Zone 3. The major settlement in this woreda is Kumame.

To combat the chronic poverty in this woreda, FARM-Africa has sponsored projects in two kebeles that are expected to benefit 4,169 people directly, and a further 60,000 people will benefit from the availability of improved animal health care from animal health workers trained by FARM-Africa.

Based on the 2007 Census conducted by the Central Statistical Agency of Ethiopia (CSA), this woreda has a total population of 32,023, of whom 17,222 are men and 14,801 women; with an area of 1,448.41 square kilometers (559.23 square miles), Simurobi Gele'alo has a population density of 22.11 people per square kilometer (57.26 people per square mile). While 935 or 2.92% are urban inhabitants, a further 9,722 or 30.36% are pastoralists. A total of 5,206 households were counted in this woreda, which results in an average of 6.2 persons to a household, and 5,283 housing units. 98.66% of the population said they were Muslim, and 1.18% were Orthodox Christians.
