= Dewe (woreda) =

Coordinates: 10°40′N 40°15′E

Dewe is one of the Districts of Ethiopia, or woredas, in the Afar Region of Ethiopia. Part of the Administrative Zone 5, Dewe is located near the base of the eastern escarpment of the Ethiopian Highlands, and bordered on the south by the Borkana River which separates it from Dalifage and Hadale'ela, on the west by the Amhara Region, on the north by Telalak, and on the east by Administrative Zone 3. The major settlement in this woreda is Wedarage. Dewe was the seat of the Sultanate of Dewe, one of the Afar's traditional sultanates in the Afar Region.

The average elevation in this woreda is 802 meters (2631 feet) above sea level. Rivers in this woreda include the Awash, which divides it into eastern and western parts. As of 2008, Dewe has 58 kilometers (36 miles) of community roads; about 29% of the total population has access to drinking water and 95% Health access. This means; 3 Health Centers and 12 Health Posts functionals in the woreda.

== Demographics ==
Based on the 2007 Census conducted by the Central Statistical Agency of Ethiopia (CSA), this woreda has a total population of 42,397, of whom 24,865 are men and 17,532 women; with an area of 760.90 square kilometers (293.79 square miles), Dewe has a population density of 55.72 people per square kilometer (144.31 people per square mile). While 2,280 or 5.38% are urban inhabitants, a further 12,994 or 30.65% are pastoralists. A total of 5,376 households were counted in this woreda, which results in an average of 7.9 persons to a household, and 6,200 housing units. 99.55% of the population said they were Muslim.
