= Dalifage =

Coordinates: 10°40′N 40°15′E

Dalifage is one of the Districts of Ethiopia, or woredas, in the Afar Region of Ethiopia. Part of the Administrative Zone 5, Dalifage is a triangle-shaped district located near the base of the eastern escarpment of the Ethiopian Highlands, and bordered on the south by Hadale'ela, on the west by the Amhara Region, and on the north by the Borkana River which separates it from Dewe.

== Demographics ==
Based on the 2007 Census conducted by the Central Statistical Agency of Ethiopia (CSA), this woreda has a total population of 36,154, of whom 21,372 are men and 14,782 women. While 4,979 or 13.77% are urban inhabitants, a further 2,088 or 5.78% are pastoralists. 99.03% of the population said they were Muslim.
