= Telalak =

District of Afar Region, Ethiopia

Coordinates: 11°10′N 40°20′E

Telalak is one of the Districts of Ethiopia, or woredas, in the Afar Region of Ethiopia. Part of the Administrative Zone 5, Telalak is located near the base of the eastern escarpment of the Ethiopian Highlands, and bordered on the south by Dewe, on the west by the Amhara Region, on the north by the Administrative Zone 1, and on the east by the Administrative Zone 3. The largest settlement in this woreda is Namelafen.

The average elevation in this woreda is 720 meters (2362 feet) above sea level. As of 2008, Telalak has 47 kilometers (29 miles) of all-weather gravel road and 71 kilometers (44 miles) of community roads; about 29% of the total population has access to drinking water.

== Demographics ==
Based on the 2007 Census conducted by the Central Statistical Agency of Ethiopia (CSA), this woreda has a total population of 37,970, of whom 22,395 are men and 15,575 women; with an area of 1,261.84 square kilometers (487.2 square miles), Telalak has a population density of 30.09 people per square kilometer (77.94 people per square mile). While 1,950 or 5.14% are urban inhabitants, a further 18,796 or 49.50% are pastoralists. A total of 5,447 households were counted in this woreda, which results in an average of 7.0 persons to a household, and 5,732 housing units. 99.73% of the population said they were Muslim.
