= Ethiopian migrant repatriation from Saudi Arabia =

Ethiopian government effort

Ethiopian migrant repatriation from Saudi Arabia refers to the large-scale effort by the Ethiopian government, in collaboration with the Kingdom of Saudi Arabia, to repatriate tens of thousands of Ethiopian nationals living in the Gulf country, many of whom were undocumented and held in detention. The agreement, announced in March 2022, followed increasing reports of poor conditions in detention centers and pressure from human rights groups.

In March 2022, Ethiopia and Saudi Arabia agreed to repatriate over 100,000 undocumented Ethiopian migrants. Human rights organizations had raised concerns about the treatment of detainees, citing overcrowding, lack of medical care, and abuse.

== Detention and human rights concerns ==
Many Ethiopian migrants were detained in overcrowded and unsanitary detention centers, such as Al-Kharj and Al-Shumaisi, often without due process.

Amnesty International documented hundreds of thousands of cases of serious, long-term mental and bodily damage caused by arbitrary detainment and forceful return in abusive and inhuman conditions.

Migrants were held solely for lacking valid residency documents, exacerbated by Saudi Aarabia's kalafa system. At least 30,000 Ethiopians remain detained under these conditions.

== Repatriation efforts ==
The Ethiopian government launched multiple phases of repatriation:

- Third phase began in March 2024, aiming to return 70,000 migrants in four months via twelve(12) weekly flights. 38 Ethiopian migrants, were killed near the coast of Djibouti when their boat overturned in the water during this time.
- In March 2025, over 1,000 Ethiopians were repatriated from Saudi Arabia in a single day, marking the fourth round of returns. These efforts are part of Ethiopia's citizen-centered diplomacy, coordinated by the Ethiopian Disaster Risk Management Commission and the Ministry of Foreign Affairs.
