= Bure Mudaytu (woreda) =

Coordinates: 10°20′N 40°30′E

Bure Mudaytu is one of the Districts of Ethiopia, or woredas in the Afar Region of Ethiopia. Part of the Administrative Zone 3, Bure Mudaytu stretches along a narrow band covering the marshy lowlands along the Awash River, with the Administrative Zone 5 to the west and Gewane to the east. The administrative center of this woreda is Debel.

The altitude of this woreda is between 300 and 700 meters (984 feet and 2297 feet) above sea level. The largest body of water in Bure Mudaytu is Lake Yardi, which is fed by the winter floods of the Awash; other rivers include the Hawadi. This woreda was affected by the March 1996 Awash floods, which were caused by unmaintained dikes breaking. However, the flooding only affected abandoned cotton fields, although local media erroneously stated that the Awash had flooded in June of that year and caused much hardship and destruction; these reports were disproved upon investigation. Another local landmark is the Bouri Formation an archeological site which has yielded numerous Australopithecines and Homo fossils, artifacts, and bones of large mammals with cut marks.

== Demographics ==
Based on the 2007 Census conducted by the Central Statistical Agency of Ethiopia (CSA), this woreda has a total population of 31,794, of whom 18,128 are men and 13,666 women; with an area of 702.09 square kilometers (271.08 square miles), Bure Mudaytu has a population density of 45.28 people per square kilometer (117.29 people per square mile). Although there are no urban inhabitants, 6,542 or 20.58% are pastoralists. A total of 5,519 households were counted in this woreda, which results in an average of 5.8 persons to a household, and 5,688 housing units. 97.3% of the population said they were Muslim, and 1.63% were Orthodox Christians.
