= Gewane (woreda) =

District in Afar Region, Ethiopia

Coordinates: 10°30′N 40°45′E

Gewane is a woreda in Afar Region, Ethiopia. Part of the Administrative Zone 3, Gewane is bordered on the south by Amibara, on the west by Bure Mudaytu and Administrative Zone 5, on the north by the Administrative Zone 1, and on the east by the Somali Region; the Awash River defines parts of the boundary with Administrative Zone 5. The administrative centre is Gewane; other towns in Gewane include Meteka.

The highest point in this woreda is Mount Ayalu (2145 m 7037 ft); other important peaks include Mount Yangudi. Bodies of water include Lake Kadabassa, which lies in the swampy lowlands that stretch alongside the Awash and serve as an important pasture for nomadic pastoralists. As of 2008, Ayesha has 56 kilometers (35 miles) of all-weather gravel road and 45 km (28 mi) of community roads; about 41% of the total population has access to drinking water. A notable local landmark is the Yangudi Rassa National Park, which occupies the northeastern corner of the woreda. There are known diatomite deposits near the village of Adamitulu, but these have not yet been developed. An archeological site near the village of Aramis in this woreda produced remains of Australopithecus.

== Demographics ==
Based on the 2007 Census conducted by the Central Statistical Agency of Ethiopia (CSA), this woreda has a total population of 31,318, of whom 17,171 are men and 14,147 women; with an area of 967.85 square km (373.69 square miles), Gewane has a population density of 32.36 people per square kilometer (83,81 people per square mile). While 5,986 or 19.11% are urban inhabitants, a further 1,280 or 4.09% are pastoralists. A total of 6,191 households were counted in this woreda, which results in an average of 5.1 persons to a household, and 6,708 housing units. 92.87% of the population said they were Muslim, and 6.42% were Orthodox Christians.
