= Meteka =

- Location in Ethiopia
- Coordinates: 9°52′N 40°31′E
- Country: Ethiopia
- Region: Afar Region
- Zone: Administrative Zone 3

Population (2005)
  - Total: 1,579 (est)

Meteka is a town in north-eastern Ethiopia. Located in Administrative Zone 3 of the Afar Region, 30 kilometers south of Gewane, it has a latitude and longitude of 9°52′N 40°31′E with an elevation of 628 meters above sea level. It is one of two towns in Gewane woreda.

Meteka marks the southern boundary of the Meteka Wetlands, a marshy portion of the lowlands of the Awash River. Ten kilometers west of the town is Lake Hertali.

Based on figures from the Central Statistical Agency in 2005, this town has an estimated total population of 1579, of whom 879 are men and 700 are women.
