= Mille (woreda) =

District in Afar Region, Ethiopia

Coordinates: 11°30′N 40°45′E

Mille is a woreda of Awsi Rasu (Administrative Zone 1) within Afar Region, Ethiopia. It is named for the Mille River, a tributary of the Awash River. Mille is bordered on the south by the Administrative Zone 3, on the southwest by Administrative Zone 5, on the west by the Amhara Region, on the northwest by Chifra, on the northeast by Dubti, and on the southeast by the Somali Region. Towns in Mille include Mille and Eli Wuha.

The highest point in this district is Mount Gabillema, at 1,459 meters (4787 feet), a dormant volcano in the southeastern part. Roads in this woreda include the feeder road between Chifra and Mille, which is 105 kilometers (65 miles) in length; it was constructed in two segments between February 1999 and February 2001 by SUR Construction. Important local landmarks include the Yangudi Rassa National Park, which covers the southeast corner of Mille, but not Mount Gabillema; and the archeological sites at Hadar and Dikika where specimens of Australopithecus afarensis have been recovered.

== History ==
In 2004, grazing conditions in Mille woreda had become degraded due to the encroachment by invasive thick and thorny Prosopis juliflora bushes, leading to significant tensions between Issa and Afar herders, due to the resulting scarcity of pasturage.

On 4 February 2007, the Afar Regional Cabinet approved the division of this woreda, creating a new woreda out of the western part, with its administrative center to be at Hadar. The Ethiopian paleoanthropologist Yohannes Haile-Selassie led a number of digs in this woreda between 2004 and 2007.

== Demographics ==
Based on the 2007 Census conducted by the Central Statistical Agency of Ethiopia (CSA), this woreda has a total population of 90,673, of whom 49,705 are men and 40,968 women; with an area of 5,345.71 square kilometers (2063.99 square miles), Mille has a population density of 16.96 people per square kilometer (43.93 people per square mile). While 14,208 or 15.67% are urban inhabitants, a further 66,212 or 73.02% are pastoralists. A total of 14,515 households were counted in this woreda, which results in an average of 6.2 persons to a household, and 15,642 housing units. 98.72% of the population said they were Muslim, and 1.22% were Orthodox Christians.
