= Chifra =

Chifra may refer to:

== Places ==
- Chifra (Ethiopian District)

== Music ==
- Chifra, a music album by Satariel (band)
