= Furse =

Furse may refer to:

- Furse (surname), an English surname
- Ulex (gorse), a genus of heathland plants
- USS Furse (DD-882), a Gearing-class destroyer of the US Navy
- For the Ethiopian district in the Afar Region, see Fursi
