= Dubti =

Ethiopian town in the Afar region

Dubti is a town Administration in north-east Ethiopia. Located in Awsi Rasu, Afar Region, this town has a latitude and longitude of 11°44′N 41°05′E with an elevation of 378 meters above sea level.

A UN-EUE mission, accompanied by two non-government organizations, surveying conditions in the Afar Region and visited Dubti 13 December 1995, at which time the town had one of two hospitals in Afar. While it offered the most advanced treatment in the Region, services available stopped short of surgery, providing only minor surgery under local anesthesia.

Based on figures from the Central Statistical Agency published in 2005, Dubti has an estimated total population of 15,445, of whom 8,501 are men and 6,944 are women. It is the largest of five towns in Dubti woreda.
