= Argobba special woreda (Afar) =

Coordinates: 9°40′N 39°50′E

Argobba (or Argoba) is a special woreda in the Afar Region of Ethiopia. This woreda is named after the Argobba people, whose homeland lies in this district. Located on the eastern escarpment of the Ethiopian Highlands, Argobba is bordered on the south, west and north by the Afar Region, and on the east by Dulecha. Settlements in this woreda include Gachine.

The average elevation in this woreda is 471 meters (1545 feet) above sea level. As of 2008, Argobba has 10 kilometers (6 miles) of all-weather gravel road and 77.5 kilometers (48.2 miles) of community roads; about 41% of the total population has access to drinking water.

== Demographics ==
Based on the 2007 Census conducted by the Central Statistical Agency of Ethiopia (CSA), this woreda has a total population of 21,794, of whom 11,645 are men and 10,149 women; with an area of 393.93 square kilometers (152.1 square miles), Argobba has a population density of 55.32 people per square kilometer (143.29 people per square mile). While 2,166 or 9.94% are urban inhabitants, this woreda is unusual for the Afar Region in having no pastoralists. A total of 3,195 households were counted in this woreda, which results in an average of 6.8 persons to a household, and 3,397 housing units. 83.38% of the population said they were Muslim, and 16.26% were Orthodox Christians.

== Agriculture ==
A sample enumeration performed by the CSA in 2001 interviewed 540 farmers in this woreda, who held an average of 5.28 hectares (13.05 acres) of land. Of the 2.85 square kilometers (1.1 square miles) of private land surveyed, 84.92% was under cultivation, 3.89% pasture, 9.72% fallow, and 1.47% was devoted to other uses; the percentage in woodland was missing. For the land under cultivation in this woreda, 88.71% is planted in cereals like maize and sorghum, 24.06% in pulses, 10.52% in vegetables, and 2.07% in root crops. Permanent crops included 1 hectare (2.5 acres) planted in coffee, 4 hectares (9.9 acres) in gesho or hops, 1 hectare (2.5 acres) in sugar cane, 12.79 hectares (31.6 acres) in fruit trees, and 9.96 hectares (24.61 acres) in bananas. 10.37% of the farmers both raise crops and livestock, while 50.74% only grow crops and 38.89% only raise livestock. Land tenure in this woreda is distributed between 81.59% own their land, 16.35% rent, and the remaining 2.07% are held under other forms of tenure.
