= Kori (woreda) =

Kori is one of the Districts of Ethiopia, or woreda, in the Afar Region of Ethiopia. Part of the Awsi Rasu (Administrative Zone 1), Kori is bordered on the south by Dubti, on the west the Administrative Zone 4, on the north by the Administrative Zone 2, on the east by Elidar. The administrative center is Ayrorta.

Kori was created by a decision of the Afar Regional Cabinet on 4 February 2007, from the northern part of Dubti.

== Demographics ==
Based on the 2007 Census conducted by the Central Statistical Agency of Ethiopia (CSA), this woreda has a total population of 30,652, of whom 16,821 are men and 13,831 women; with an area of 2,869.56 square kilometers (1107.94 square miles), Kori has a population density of 10.68 people per square kilometer (27.67 people per square mile). While 0 or 0.00% are urban inhabitants, a further 16,951 or 55.30% are pastoralists. A total of 5,024 households were counted in this woreda, which results in an average of 6.1 persons to a household, and 5,245 housing units. 99.8% of the population said they were Muslim.
