= Dulecha =

District in Afar Region, Ethiopia

Coordinates: 9°40′N 40°10′E

Dulecha is one of the woredas in the Afar Region of Ethiopia. Part of the Administrative Zone 3, Dulecha is bordered on the south by Awash Fentale, on the west by the Argobba special woreda, on the north by the Administrative Zone 5, and on the east by the Awash River which separates it from Amibara. The largest settlement in Dulecha is Dulecha.

Elevations in this woreda range from 800 (along the Awash) to 1100 meters (3609 feet) above sea level. The highest peak in Dulecha is the dormant volcano Mount Dofen (1151 meters or 3776 feet). As of 2008, Dulecha has 239 kilometers (149 miles) of all-weather gravel road; about 41% of the total population has access to drinking water.

In August 2006 the Awash floods affected one village in Dulecha. Nearly all of the residents had previously left their homes for higher and safer grounds; current estimates put the displaced at 2,200. However, some 50-60 weak and elderly members of the community were reportedly surrounded by the flooding as they could not move out on their own.

== Demographics ==
Based on the 2007 Census conducted by the Central Statistical Agency of Ethiopia (CSA), this woreda has a total population of 20,687, of whom 11,202 are men and 9,485 women; with an area of 1,476.85 square kilometers (570.21 square miles), Dulecha has a population density of 14.01 people per square kilometer (36.28 people per square mile). While 1,190 or 5.75% are urban inhabitants, a further 8,003 or 38.69% are pastoralists. A total of 3,823 households were counted in this woreda, which results in an average of 5.4 persons to a household, and 3,880 housing units. 93.87% of the population said they were Muslim, 4.53% were Protestants, and 1.18% were Orthodox Christians
