= Aluto =

Volcano in Ethiopia

- Location within Ethiopia

Highest point
- Elevation: 2,365 m (7,759 ft)
- Prominence: 765 m (2,510 ft)
- Listing: List of volcanoes in Ethiopia
- Coordinates: 7.787°N 38.771°E

Geography
- Location: Ethiopia

Geology
- Mountain type: Stratovolcano
- Last eruption: ~ 50 BC

Aluto (also known as Alutu) (2,365 metres (7,759 ft)) is a dormant stratovolcano in Ethiopia, located in the Ethiopian Rift Valley in southern Oromia region between Lake Langano and Lake Ziway. It is the site of the Aluto–Langano Geothermal Power Station.

== Geology ==
It features numerous vents along E-W and NNW-SSE trending fissures which converge at the coordinates of the volcano center, which is the center of a hypothesized caldera surrounded by rims, visible especially in the south and west. The largest vent is 1 km × 0.5 km in size just SE of the volcano center and along the SE rim of the volcano. The volcano covers a surface area of appr. 25 km^{2}. The silicic volcano center has an eruption history of more than 500,000 years, the last eruption was around 2400 years ago. Eruptions from Aluto may have influenced the dispersal of hominin populations in East Africa.

Strong fumarolic activity continues throughout today. The volcano is permanently inflating and deflating with the strongest movements at the center of the hypothesized caldera, indicating some activity around 5 km below the volcano.

Close to the center of the hypothetical caldera is the site of the high-temperature Aluto–Langano geothermal field with temperatures between 300 and 400 °C at depths below 1,200 meters. This geothermal field covers an area of about 8 km^{2}.

The field is also the site of the Aluto–Langano Geothermal Power Station, a pilot power plant to explore geothermal energy in Ethiopia.

== See also ==
- List of stratovolcanoes
- List of volcanoes in Ethiopia
