= Lake Hawassa =

Endorheic basin in Sidama Region, Ethiopia

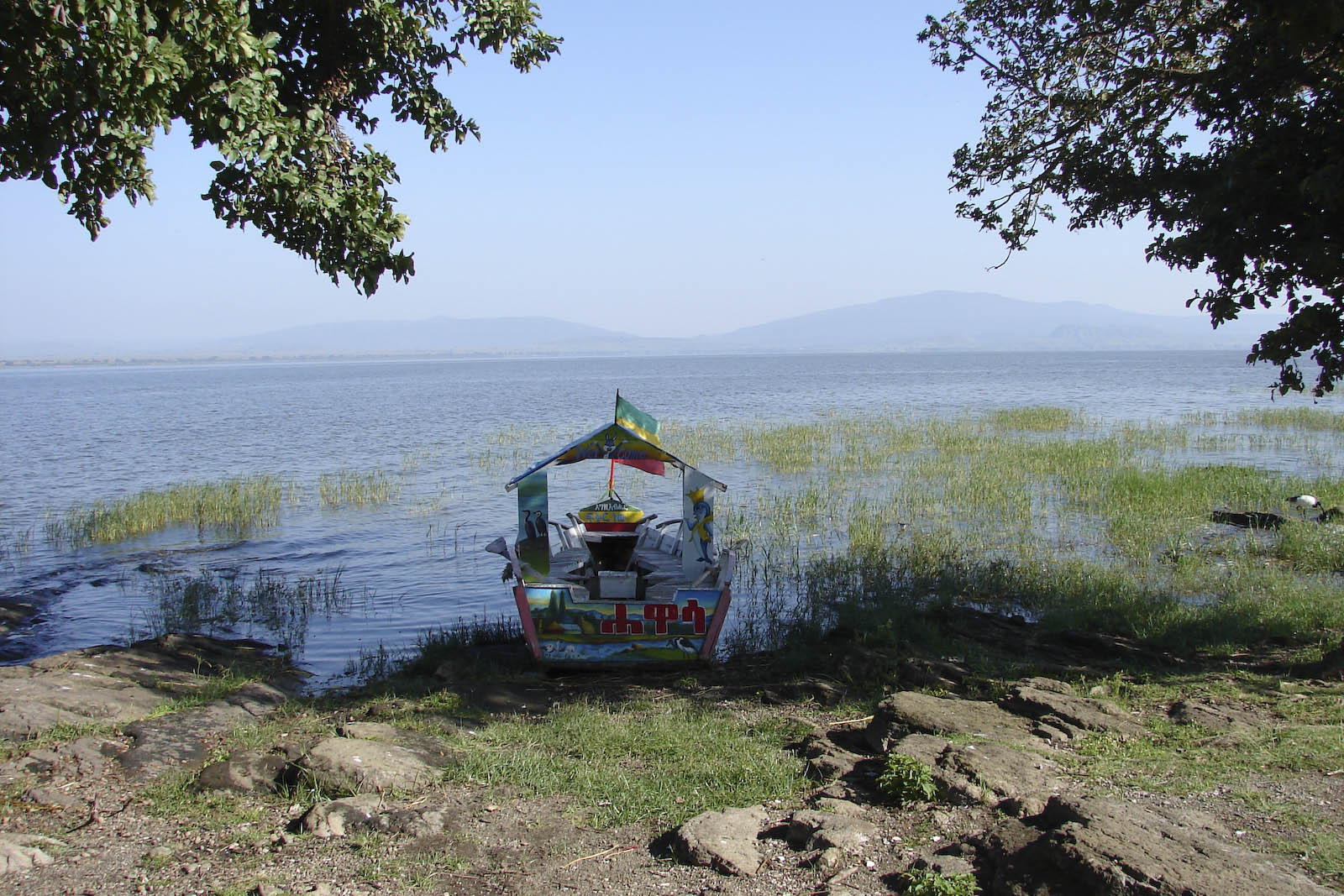

- Location within Ethiopia

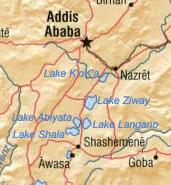
- Lake Awasa is the small lake near the bottom of the map, just west of the city of Awasa.
- Coordinates: 7°03′N 38°26′E
- Primary outflows: subterranean (?)
- Basin countries: Ethiopia
- Max. length: 16 km (9.9 mi)
- Max. width: 9 km (5.6 mi)
- Surface area: 129 km^{2} (50 sq mi)
- Max. depth: 10 m (33 ft)
- Surface elevation: 1,708 m (5,604 ft)

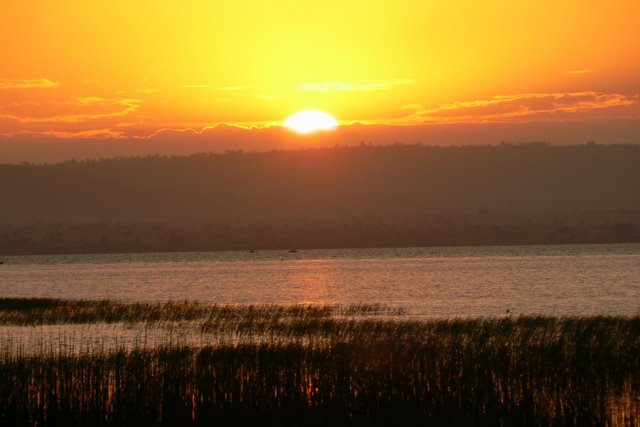
Sunset

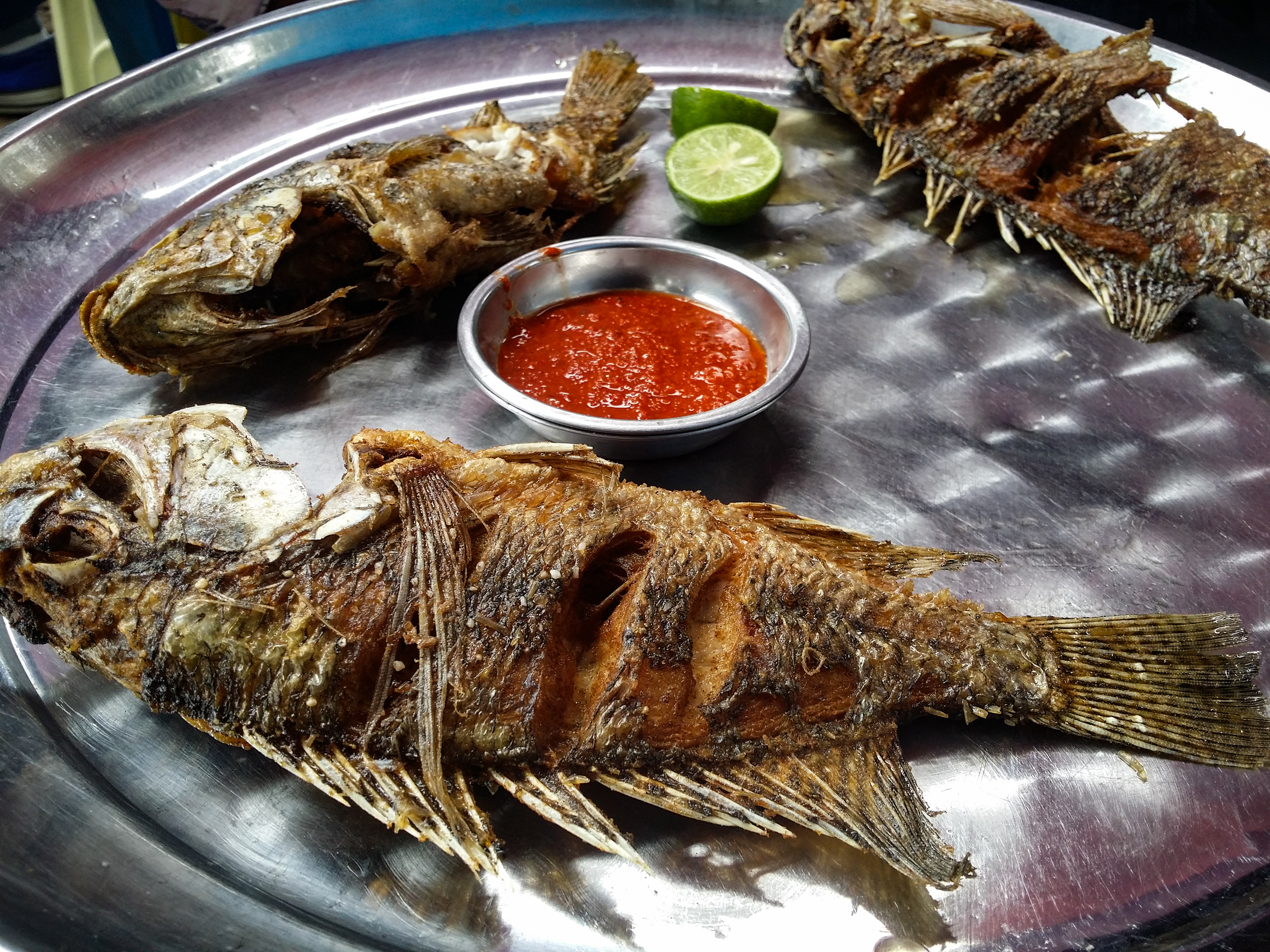
Fish from Lake Awasa

Lake Hawassa or Awasa, is an endorheic basin in Sidama Region of Ethiopia, located in the Main Ethiopian Rift south of Addis Ababa, the capital city of the country. According to the Statistical Abstract of Ethiopia for 1967/68, the lake is 16 km long and 9 km wide, with a surface area of 129 square kilometers. It has a maximum depth of 10 meters and is located at an elevation of 1,708 meters. It is located inside the Awasa Caldera.

Because it is relatively accessible to scientists, Lake Hawassa is the most studied of the Rift Valley lakes in Ethiopia. According to William Taylor, a member of the African Lakes and Rivers Research Group at the University of Waterloo, Lake Hawassa is, despite its lack of an outflow, "essentially a freshwater lake (conductivity is variable, but less than 1,000) indicating that it must have a subterranean outlet."

== See also ==
- Rift Valley lakes
- Endorheic basin
