= Corbetti Caldera =

Volcano in Ethiopia

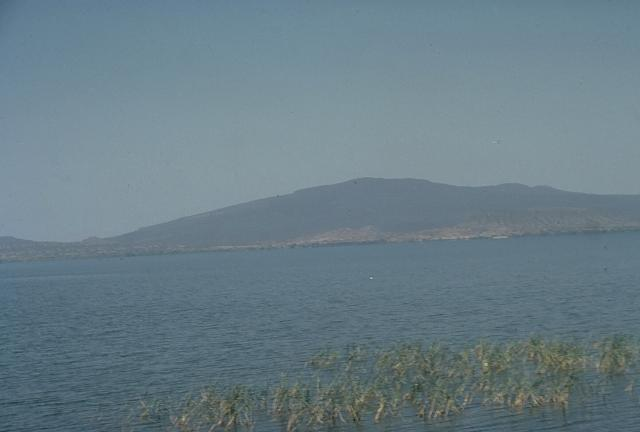

Highest point
- Elevation: 2,320 m (7,610 ft)
- Coordinates: 07°10′26″N 38°27′29″E

Geography
- Location within Ethiopia
- Location: Oromia Region, near Hawassa

Geology
- Mountain type: Caldera

The Corbetti Caldera is an actively deforming volcano in the Main Ethiopian Rift. It is the site of the Corbetti Geothermal Power Station. The Corbetti Caldera is 15 km (9.3 mi) across and overlaps an older (pleistocene), 30 by 40 km (19 by 25 mi) caldera called Awasa, which is considered the same volcanic system. The Corbetti Caldera contains the central cone called Urji and a large obsidian dome called Chebbi. The Awasa Caldera contains Lake Hawassa and the town of Awasa, the Corbetti caldera contains half of the Senkelle Swayne's Hartebeest Sanctuary.
