= Chifra (woreda) =

District in Afar Region, Ethiopia

Coordinates: 11°45′N 40°20′E

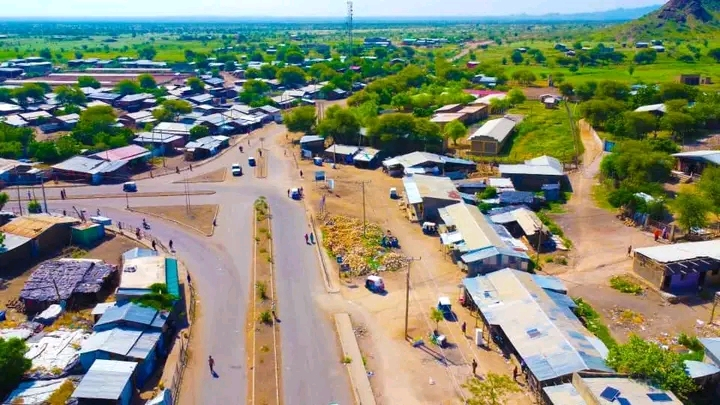
View of the Chifra skyline.

Chifra (or Sifra) is a woreda in Afar Region, Ethiopia. Part of the Awsi Rasu (Administrative Zone 1), Chifra is located In 40.016562, 11.603945 Altitude and longitude coordinations, near the base of the eastern escarpment of the Ethiopian Highlands and bordered on the south by Mille, on the west by the Amhara Region, on the north by the Administrative Zone 4, and on the east by Dubti; the Logiya River defines part of the boundary with Zone 4.

== Overview ==
The average elevation in this woreda is 825 meters (2707 feet) above sea level; the highest peak is Mount Groppo (900 meters or 2953 feet). Rivers include the Mille. There are two roads in Chifra, connecting its administrative center to other towns. One runs from Chifra to Mille, which is 105 kilometers in length; it was constructed in two segments between February 1999 and February 2001 by SUR Construction. The other goes south to Garsa Gita where it joins the all-weather road to Bati. As of 2008, about 22.33% of the total population of Chifra has access to drinking water.

Education in this woreda is in three forms: formal, non-formal, and Koranic. Formal education goes to Grade 8 and non-formal education is implemented in 4 kebeles by the Afar Pastoralist Development Association. The non-formal education is in the Afar language and includes mathematics; a total of 843 students have achieved literacy. As of 2004, there were 223 people (30 women, 31 men, and the rest children) in non-formal education taught by 6 teachers. Details about the local Koranic education is not available, but at one village children had been learning Koranic verses there for 117 years.

== Demographics ==
Based on the 2007 Census conducted by the Central Statistical Agency of Ethiopia (CSA), this woreda has a total population of 91,080, of whom 50,861 are men and 40,219 women; with an area of 1,519.32 square kilometers (586.61 square miles), Chifra has a population density of 59.95 people per square kilometer (155.26 people per square mile). While 9,132 or 10.03% are urban inhabitants, a further 38,234 or 41.98% are pastoralists. A total of 14,518 households were counted in this woreda, which results in an average of 6.3 persons to a household, and 14,937 housing units. 98.88% of the population said they were Muslim, and 1.09% were Orthodox Christians.
