= Ethiopian Disaster Risk Management Commission =

Autonomous Ethiopian government agency

- የኢትዮጵያ የአደጋ ጊዜ ሥራ አመራር ኮሚሽን yäʾityop̣ya yäʾädäga gize śəra ʾämärar komišn

Agency overview
- Formed: 2015
- Jurisdiction: Ethiopia
- Headquarters: Nifas Silk-Lafto, Addis Ababa, Ethiopia; 8.970°N 38.760°E
- Agency executive: Ambassador Dr. Shiferaw Teklemariam, Commissioner
- Website: edrmc.gov.et

The Ethiopian Disaster Risk Management Commission (Amharic: የኢትዮጵያ የአደጋ ጊዜ ሥራ አመራር ኮሚሽን, romanized: yäʾityop̣ya yäʾädäga gize śəra ʾämärar komišn; EDRMC) is an autonomous Ethiopian government agency responsible for management and control of national disaster risk policy in Ethiopia. It was regulated by the Council of Ministers Regulation No. 363/2015.

== Overview ==
The Ethiopian Disaster Risk Management Commission (EDRMC) was established in 2015 by the Council of Ministers Regulation No. 363/2015. The commission is responsible for coordinating and managing the disaster risk policy and initiates strategies in every administrative levels. In addition, the proclamation declared the National Disaster Risk Management Commission as an autonomous federal government office with functions and powers.

In late 2021, EDRMC relocated its report to the Prime Minister Office. During the 2024–25 earthquakes, EDRMC was actively working with the collaboration of the Asian Disaster Preparedness Center (ADPC).

== 2025 proclamation ==
In 2025, the House of Peoples' Representatives approved the Ethiopian Disaster Risk Management Proclamation No. 1386/2025, which came into force on 28 July 2025, replacing the earlier framework under Council of Ministers Regulation No. 363/2015. The law re-establishes the EDRMC as an autonomous federal agency, creates a National Disaster Risk Management Council, recognises civil society organisations as partners in the system, and sets up an Ethiopian Disaster Risk Response Fund. As of 2026, the commission is led by Commissioner Shiferaw Teklemariam.

== See also ==
- 2024–25 Ethiopian earthquakes
