= Dubti (woreda) =

District in Afar Region, Ethiopia

Coordinates: 11°50′N 41°00′E

Dubti is a woreda in Afar Region, Ethiopia. Part of the Awsi Rasu (Administrative Zone 1), Dubti is bordered on the southwest by Mille, on the west by Chifra, on the northwest by the Administrative Zone 4, on the north by Kori, on the northeast by Elidar, on the east by Asayita, and on the southeast by Afambo. Towns in Dubti include Dubti, Logiya, and Semera.

== Overview ==
The average elevation in this woreda is 503 meters (1650 feet) above sea level; the highest point in Dubti is Mount Manda Hararo (600 meters or 1967 feet). Rivers include the Awash River, which splits the woreda into northern and southern parts, and its tributary the Logiya. Alongside the Awash are the Dubti Marshes, which cover an area 34 by 12 kilometers (21.1 by 7.5 miles), and whose dominant vegetation is Phragmites. These marshes are under encroachment by the Tendaho Cotton Plantation, whose fields surround the town of Dubti. As of 2008, Dubti has 314 kilometers (195 miles) of all-weather gravel road; about 22.33% of the total population has access to drinking water.

The Ethiopian Ministry of Mines and Energy announced July 2007 that a geothermal project in this woreda, yielded encouraging results. Six wells sunk in Dubti showed that the geothermal energy had the capacity of producing as much as 30-megawatts of electricity, which would provide sufficient electric power for the towns of Semera, Dubti and Logiya towns, as well as an amount to export to neighboring countries.

On 4 February 2007, the Afar Regional Cabinet approved the division of this woreda, creating a new woreda, Kori, out of the northern part with its administrative center at Guluble Af.

== Demographics ==
Based on the 2007 national census conducted by the Central Statistical Agency of Ethiopia (CSA), this woreda has a total population of 65,342, of whom 34,893 are men and 30,449 women; 32,940 or 50.41% are urban inhabitants. 88.01% of the population said they were Muslim, and 11.46% were Orthodox Christians.

Based on figures published by the Central Statistical Agency in 2005, this woreda had an estimated total population of 87,197, of whom 36,281 were males and 50,916 were females; 24,236 or 27.79% of its population were urban dwellers, which is greater than the Zone average of 14.9%. With an estimated area of 3601.4 square kilometers (1390.5 square miles), Dubti had an estimated population density of 24.21 people per square kilometer (46.99 people per square mile) in 2005 and 18.14 people per square kilometer (62.71 people per square mile).

== Agriculture ==
A sample enumeration performed by the CSA in 2001 interviewed 1676 farmers in this woreda, who held an average of 0.72 hectares (1.78 acres) of land. Of the 1.21 square kilometers (0.47 square miles) of private land surveyed, 28.15% was under cultivation, 64.53% fallow, 3.46% was devoted to other uses. Although the percentage in pasture or woodland was missing from the CSA enumeration, a later survey reported 0.5% of the woreda had tree cover. For the land under cultivation in this woreda, 27.9% in planted in cereals like maize; none of the land was planted in pulses and vegetables. All of the farmers reporting only raised livestock. For land tenure in this woreda, 94% own their land; the figures for those renting or holding land under other forms of tenure are missing.
