= Corbetti Geothermal Power Station =

Power station in Ethiopia

- Country: Ethiopia
- Location: Corbetti Caldera, Oromia Region, near Hawassa
- Coordinates: 07°10′26″N 38°27′29″E
- Status: Under construction
- Construction began: 2014
- Construction cost: US$4 billion
- Owner: Corbetti Geothermal Company Plc.

Thermal power station
- Primary fuel: Geothermal

Power generation
- Nameplate capacity: 500 MW (670,000 hp), Expandable to 1,000 MW (1,300,000 hp)

The Corbetti Geothermal Power Station, is a 500 MW (670,000 hp) geothermal power station, under construction in Ethiopia. When fully developed, the power station will be the largest grid-ready independently developed geothermal power station in the country. The developers of this power plant plan to expand it from 10 megawatts to 60 megawatts, then to 500 megawatts and to possibly 1,000 MW. They have given themselves until 2030 to complete this renewable energy development.

== Location ==
The power station is located in the Corbetti Caldera, near the town of Hawassa, in the Sidama Region of Ethiopia, approximately 281 kilometres (175 mi), south of Addis Ababa, the capital and largest city in Ethiopia.

The Corbetti geothermal concession area measures 6,500 square kilometres (2,500 mi^{2}). Scientists selected an area measuring 200 square kilometres (77 mi^{2}), where temperatures are recorded up to 350 °C (662 °F), with ability to generate 500MW up to 1,000MW annually.

== Overview ==
The power station will be developed in phases. The first phase involves drilling of six exploratory wells for the development of a power plant with capacity of the initial 10MW . This will inform the progress to the next phase and that time will also be used to explore a power purchase agreement with Ethiopian Electric Power, the national electricity utility company, responsible for generation and transmission.

The first phase also involves drilling of injection wells, laying of a water pipeline, establishment of water extraction wells and building of an access area. Two generation units, each with capacity of 5MW, will be installed and an electricity substation will be built. Ethiopian Electric Power will build a 15 kilometres (9 mi) transmission line from the power station to a point where the energy will enter the national gird.

The second phase involves the drilling of 13 more geothermal wells and the addition of another 50 megawatts of "commercial-scale" output, bringing capacity to 60MW. Based on the results of the first two phases, the power station will be gradually expanded to 500MW and then to 1,000MW.

InfraCo Africa, Ethiopian Electric Power and the Government of Ethiopia agreed on a power purchase agreement (PPA) in 2017. In 2020, that PPA was amended to include a clause for the 25-year duration and specification that the developers will operate and maintain the power station for the entire duration of the PPA.

== Developers ==
The power station is under development by Corbetti Geothermal Company Plc. (CGC), a special-purpose company registered in the United Kingdom, whose shareholding is illustrated in the table below.

Shareholding In Corbetti Geothermal Company
Rank	Shareholder	Domicile	Percentage	Notes
1	InfraCo Africa	United Kingdom		
2	Berkeley Energy	United Kingdom		
3	Iceland Drilling	Iceland		
4	Reykjavik Geothermal	Iceland		
	Total		100.00	

== Funding ==
The cost of construction of the first phase of this infrastructure project (the first 10 megawatts) is entirely equity funded. InfraCo Africa injected two equal amounts of US$15 million each, once in September 2015 and again in January 2018.

It is expected that the second phase (the next 50 megawatts) will be funded with borrowed money. The general plan is to have the completed development (500 megawatts) funded 25 percent with equity and 75 percent with debt. The total financial outlay for the 1,000 megawatts development is estimated at US$4 billion.

The following institutions have provided funding to this power station: 1. African Development Bank 2. European Union-Africa Infrastructure Trust Fund 3. UK Department for International Development 4. United States Agency for International Development

== Construction ==
The contract for the geothermal drilling was awarded to Mannvit Engineering, based in Kopavogi, Iceland. A consortium comprising Mannvit and Consulting Engineers, was selected by Corbetti Geothermal Company Plc., as owners' engineer. Rama Construction Private Limited Company, an Ethiopian, general contractor, was selected to construct 6 kilometres (4 mi) of roads, drilling and installing 11 kilometres (7 mi) of water pipeline.

== See also ==
- List of power stations in Ethiopia
- Tulu Moye Geothermal Power Station
- Energy in Ethiopia
