= Tulu Moye Geothermal Power Station =

Geothermal power station in Ethiopia

- Country: Ethiopia
- Location: Tulu Moye, Oromia Region
- Coordinates: 08°09′41″N 39°07′46″E
- Status: Under construction
- Construction began: 2021
- Commission date: 2023 (Expected)
- Owner: Tulu Moye Geothermal Operations Plc. (TMGO)

Thermal power station
- Primary fuel: Geothermal

Power generation
- Nameplate capacity: 50 MW (67,000 hp), Expandable to 150 MW (200,000 hp)

The Tulu Moye Geothermal Power Station, is a 50 MW (67,000 hp) geothermal power station, under construction in Ethiopia. When fully developed, the power station will be the first grid-ready independently developed geothermal power station in the country. The developers of this power plant, plan to expand it to 150 megawatts in the second phase, planned for the following five years.

== Location ==
The power station is located near the Tulu Moye Volcano, in the Oromia Region of Ethiopia, approximately 100 kilometres (62 mi), southeast of Addis Ababa, the capital and largest city in Ethiopia. The concession site comprises 588 square kilometres (227 mi^{2}).

== Overview ==
The power station will be developed in phases. The first phase involves drilling of 12 holes, two of which are injection holes, while the remaining ten are production holes. The next infrastructure is the construction of a steam collection and injection system. The addition of a "water-cooled condensing steam plant" comes after that. Other infrastructure includes a 230kV electric switchyard and a 230kV transmission line to the Koka-Wakena substation, about 30 kilometres (19 mi), outside of Addis Ababa, where the energy will be injected into the national grid.

== Developers ==
The power station is under development by Tulu Moye Geothermal Operations Private Limited Company (TMGO), a special-purpose company registered in Ethiopia. In turn, TMGO is 100 percent owned by Tulu Moye SAS, a company registered in France, whose shareholding is illustrated in the table below.

Shareholding In Tulu Moye SAS
| Rank | Shareholder | Domicile | Percentage |
|---|---|---|---|
| 1 | Meridiam Infrastructure Africa Fund | France | 51.00 |
| 2 | Reykjavik Geothermal | Iceland | 49.00 |
| | Total | | 100.00 |

== Funding ==
The cost of construction of the first phase of this infrastructure project (the first 50 megawatts) is budgeted at US$260 million, borne by the developers; 25 percent as equity and 75 percent as debt.

== Construction ==
In October 2019, the drilling contract was awarded to Kenya Electricity Generating Company (Kengen), a company from neighboring Kenya. The drilling contract price is quoted as US$52 million for eight wells; at $6.5 million per geothermal well.

== See also ==
- List of power stations in Ethiopia
- Corbetti Geothermal Power Station
- Energy in Ethiopia
