= Gewane =

Gewane Gawwaani
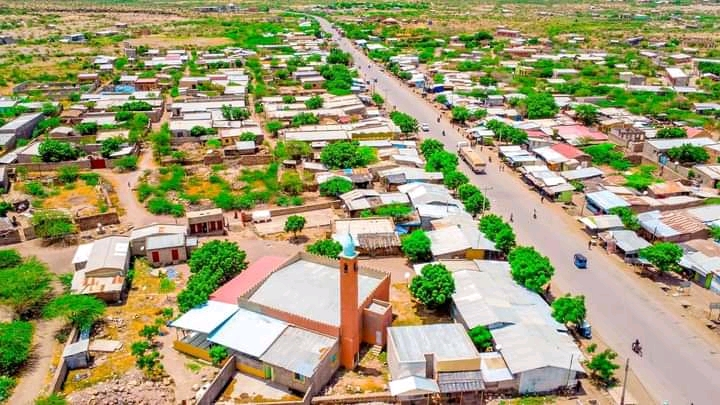

- Location in Ethiopia
- Coordinates: 10°9′59″N 40°38′43″E
- Country: Ethiopia
- Region: Afar Region
- Zone: Administrative Zone 3

Population (2005)
  - Total: 2,000 (est)
- Climate: BSh

Gewane is a town in north-eastern Ethiopia. Located in Administrative Zone 3 of the Afar Region, it has an elevation of 618 meters above sea level. Gewane is locally known as New Gewane, 2 kilometers east of the original settlement known as Old Gewane; the town was relocated astride the main, all-weather highway. It is the administrative center of Gewane woreda.

== Overview ==
Philip Briggs has described Gewane as "a somewhat unremarkable urban sprawl, distinguished only by the imposing presence of Mount Azelu, an isolated peak of volcanic origin which rises almost 1,000m above the surrounding plains east of the town." The headquarters of the Yangudi Rassa National Park are located in Gewane.

The British explorer L.M. Nesbitt, who travelled through the area in 1928, described his stay of a couple of days in a village in Gewane, entertained by the local chief Abdul Momi, whom he described as "the Falstaff of Gewani". The Afar National Liberation Movement (ANLM), run by young intellectuals who had split from the Afar Liberation Front (ALF), met in Gewane with the Derg in April 1976 at an Afar congress. Afterwards a number of ANLM members were appointed to local administrative positions, which weakened both the ALF's military activity and political influence amongst the Afar. The weekly newspaper Tobiya reported in January 1996 that three high ranking employees of the Water Resource and Development Authority had been killed near the town.

== Demographics ==
Based on figures from the Central Statistical Agency in 2005, this town has an estimated total population of 11,032, of whom 6,304 are men and 4,728 are women. According to the 1996 national census this town had a population of 8,600.
