= Awash Fentale (woreda) =

District in Afar Region, Ethiopia

Coordinates: 9°06′N 40°02′E

Awash Fentale is a woreda in Afar Region, Ethiopia. Part of the Administrative Zone 3, Awash Fentale is bordered on the south by the Oromia Region, on the west by the Amhara Region, on the north by Dulecha, and on the east by Amibara. Towns in Awash Fentale include Awash Sebat Kilo and Sabure.

Rivers in this woreda include the Awash and its tributary the Germama. A large portion of this woreda is occupied by the Awash National Park.

The dire conditions of the 2002 drought led local pastoralists, which included members of the Afar, Karrayyu and the Ittu Oromo, to armed conflicts over grazing and water access.

== Demographics ==
Based on the 2007 Census conducted by the Central Statistical Agency of Ethiopia (CSA), this woreda has a total population of 29,780, of whom 15,475 are men and 14,305 women; with an area of 1,046.41 square kilometers (404.02 square miles), Awash Fentale has a population density of 28.46 people per square kilometer (73.71 people per square mile). While 16,849 or 56.58% are urban inhabitants, a further 1,695 or 5.69% are pastoralists. A total of 7,421 households were counted in this woreda, which results in an average of 4.0 persons to a household, and 7,751 housing units. 68.26% of the population said they were Muslim, 25.75% were Orthodox Christians, and 5.21% were Protestants.

== Agriculture ==
A sample enumeration performed by the CSA in 2001 interviewed 2303 farmers in this woreda, who held an average of 0.64 hectares (1.58 acres) of land. Of the 1.47 square kilometers (0.57 square miles) of private land surveyed, 63.3% was under cultivation, 1.89% pasture, 24.83% fallow, and 9.96% was devoted to other uses; none was used as woodland. For the land under cultivation in this woreda, 33.22% was planted in cereals like maize, 10.71% in vegetables, and 20.53% in root crops; none of the land was planted in pulses. A further 0.03 hectares (0.07 acres) was planted in fruit trees. All of the farmers claimed that they only raised livestock. Land tenure in this woreda is distributed between 91.06% owned their land, 4.51% rented, and the remaining 4.43% held their land under other forms of tenure.
