= Reppie waste-to-energy plant =

Reppie
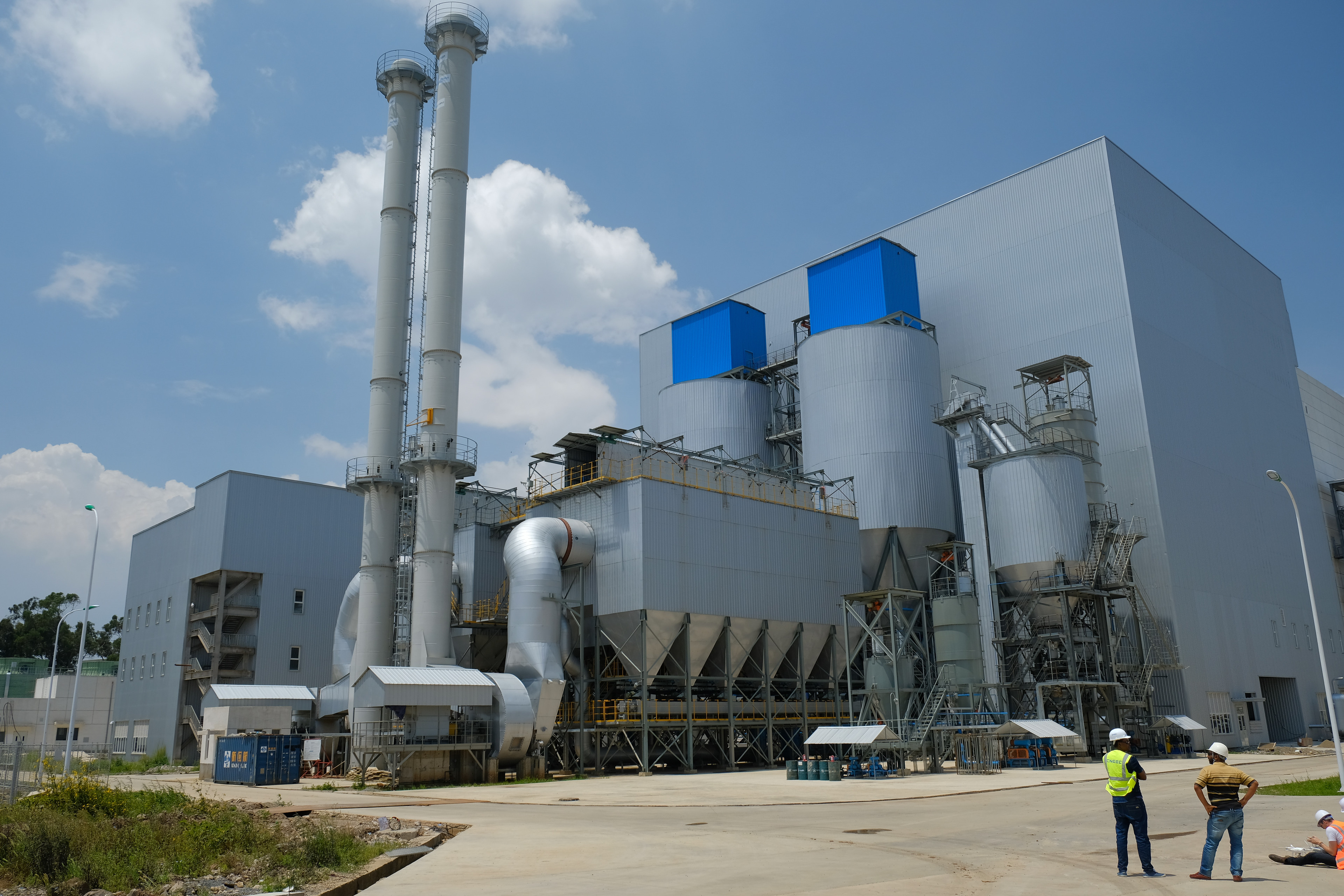
- Official name: Reppie Waste-to-Energy Plant
- Country: Ethiopia
- Location: Addis Ababa
- Coordinates: 08°58′40.1″N 38°42′35.6″E
- Status: Operational
- Construction began: October 2014
- Commission date: April 2019
- Construction cost: USD 118.95m
- Owner: Ethiopian Electric Power
- Operator: EEPCO

Thermal power station
- Primary fuel: Municipal Solid Waste

Power generation
- Nameplate capacity: 25MW
- Capacity factor: 90%

External links
- Commons: Related media on Commons

The Reppie waste-to-energy plant is a waste-to-energy plant in Addis Ababa, Ethiopia, which treats waste from the city. The plant was developed by Cambridge Industries Ltd for Ethiopian Electric Power and Addis Ababa City Administration. The facility was founded by Samuel Alemayehu to tackle waste in the city of Addis Ababa. The plant became operational in August 2018 making it the first waste-to-energy plant in Africa.

== Overview ==
The Reppie waste-to-energy plant includes two combustion systems (MARTIN SITY 2000 reverse grates) with 2 waste cranes with a capacity of 2x700 ton/d = 1400 ton/d. The Reppie site is built on reclaimed land from an old landfill. The sites include facilities to process household and commercial waste, using waste combustion to recover energy, biological treatment, re-use, recycling and landfill.

== Gallery ==
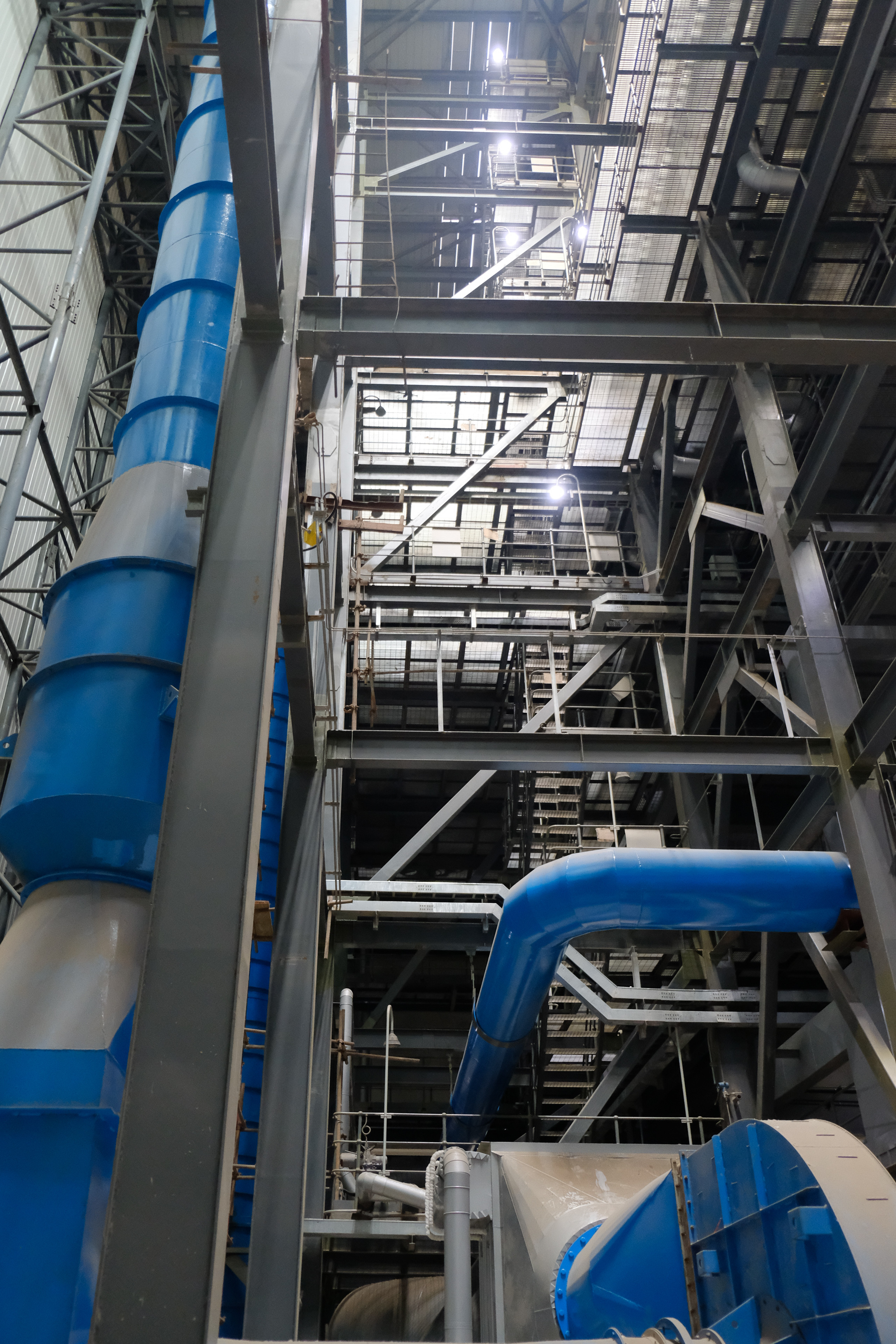
Reppie Waste to Energy facility boilers

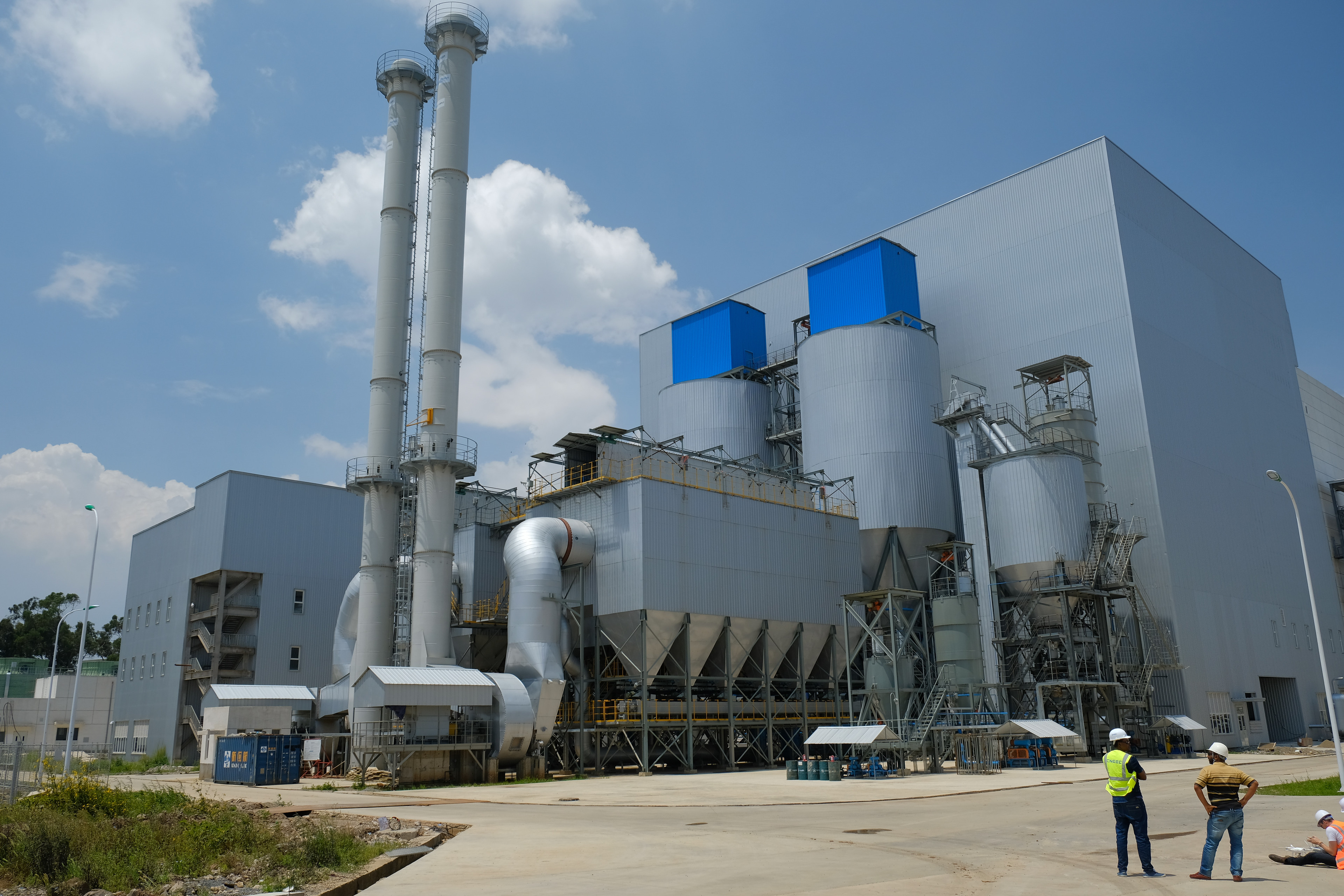
Reppie Waste-to-Energy in Addis Ababa, Ethiopia
