= Amibara (woreda) =

District in Afar Region, Ethiopia

Coordinates: 9°40′N 40°20′E

Amibara is a woreda in Afar Region, Ethiopia. Part of the Administrative Zone 3, Amibara is bordered on the south by Awash Fentale, on the west by the Awash River which separates it from Dulecha, on the northwest by the Administrative Zone 5, on the north by Gewane, on the east by the Somali Region, and on the southeast by Oromia Region. Towns in Amibara include Awash Arba, Awash Sheleko, Melka Sedi and Melka Were.

The notable landmarks in this woreda include the fissure vent Hertali (900 meters or 2953 feet).

== Demographics ==
Based on the 2007 Census conducted by the Central Statistical Agency of Ethiopia (CSA), this woreda has a total population of 63,378, of whom 35,374 are men and 28,004 women; with an area of 2,007.05 square kilometers (774.93 square miles), Amibara has a population density of 31.58 people per square kilometer (81.78 people per square mile). While 28,137 or 44.40% are urban inhabitants, a further 6,555 or 10.34% are pastoralists. A total of 13,729 households were counted in this woreda, which results in an average of 4.6 persons to a household, and 14,773 housing units. 68.86% of the population said they were Muslim, 21.2% were Orthodox Christians, and 9.18% were Protestants.

== Agriculture ==
Commercial agricultural activity in Amibara began before the Italian invasion, when a German-Ethiopian named David Hall operated a farm at Melka Werer.

A local tradition is that a foreigner in this woreda introduced the invasive species Prosopis juliflora to the Afar Region in 1988. Although the original intent was to combat erosion, the species has come to dominate at least 15 square kilometers of land in Amibara, endangering 11 species of trees, 6 shrubs, and 6 grass, all of which the local pastoralists, as well as native wildlife, depend on. This weed has also made growing cotton, an important cash crop, more difficult In response to this threat, FARM-Africa has helped local inhabitants to organize themselves to eradicate Prosopis from 280 hectares in the Region, as well as build three pod-crushing mills in Amibara and Gewane woredas.

A sample enumeration performed by the CSA in 2001 interviewed 9979 farmers in this woreda, who held an average of 0.2 hectares (0.5 acres) of land. Of the 1.75 square kilometers (0.66 square miles) of private land surveyed, 68.81% was under cultivation; returns for other uses of land was missing. For the land under cultivation in this woreda, 180 hectares (445 acres) was planted in vegetables, 3 hectares (7.4 acres) in sugar cane, 96 hectares (237 acres) in root crops, 146 hectares (361 acres) in fruit trees like lemons and oranges, and 144.94 hectares (358.15 acres) in bananas; the returns for cereals and pulses is missing. 10.37% of the farmers both raise crops and livestock, while 1.7% only grow crops and 94.7% only raise livestock. Details about land tenure is missing.
