= Geological Survey of Ethiopia =

Autonomous Ethiopian government agency

Agency overview
- Formed: 1968; 57 years ago
- Preceding agency: Ethiopian Geological Institute
- Jurisdiction: Ethiopia
- Headquarters: Near Gurd Shola, CMC Road, Addis Ababa, Ethiopia; 9.01923684085803°N 38.81190587116434°E
- Agency executive: Masresha Gebreselassie, General Manager
- Website: www.mom.gov.et/index.php/geological-survey/about-the-geological-survey-of-ethiopia-gse/

The Geological Survey of Ethiopia (GSE), formerly known as the Ethiopian Geological Institute, is an autonomous Ethiopian government agency responsible for geological mapping, mineral exploration, data dissemination, drilling and laboratory analysis, developing geo-science skills and providing consultancy services to government and non-governmental organizations.

== History ==
The Ethiopian Geological Institute was founded in 1968 as a department within the Ministry of Mines and Energy. before becoming autonomous in 1984 as the Ethiopian Institute of Geological Surveys (EIGS). In 2000. it was renamed as the Geological Survey of Ethiopia (GSE).

It is responsible for:

- Geological mapping
- Mineral exploration
- Data dissemination
- Drilling and laboratory analysis
- Developing geo-science skills
- Providing consultancy services to government and non-governmental organizations

The GSE is headed by a General Manager, appointed by the government. The current general manager is Masresha Gebreselassie since 2018.

== See also ==
- Geology of Ethiopia
