= Reykjavik Geothermal =

Icelandic geothermal development company

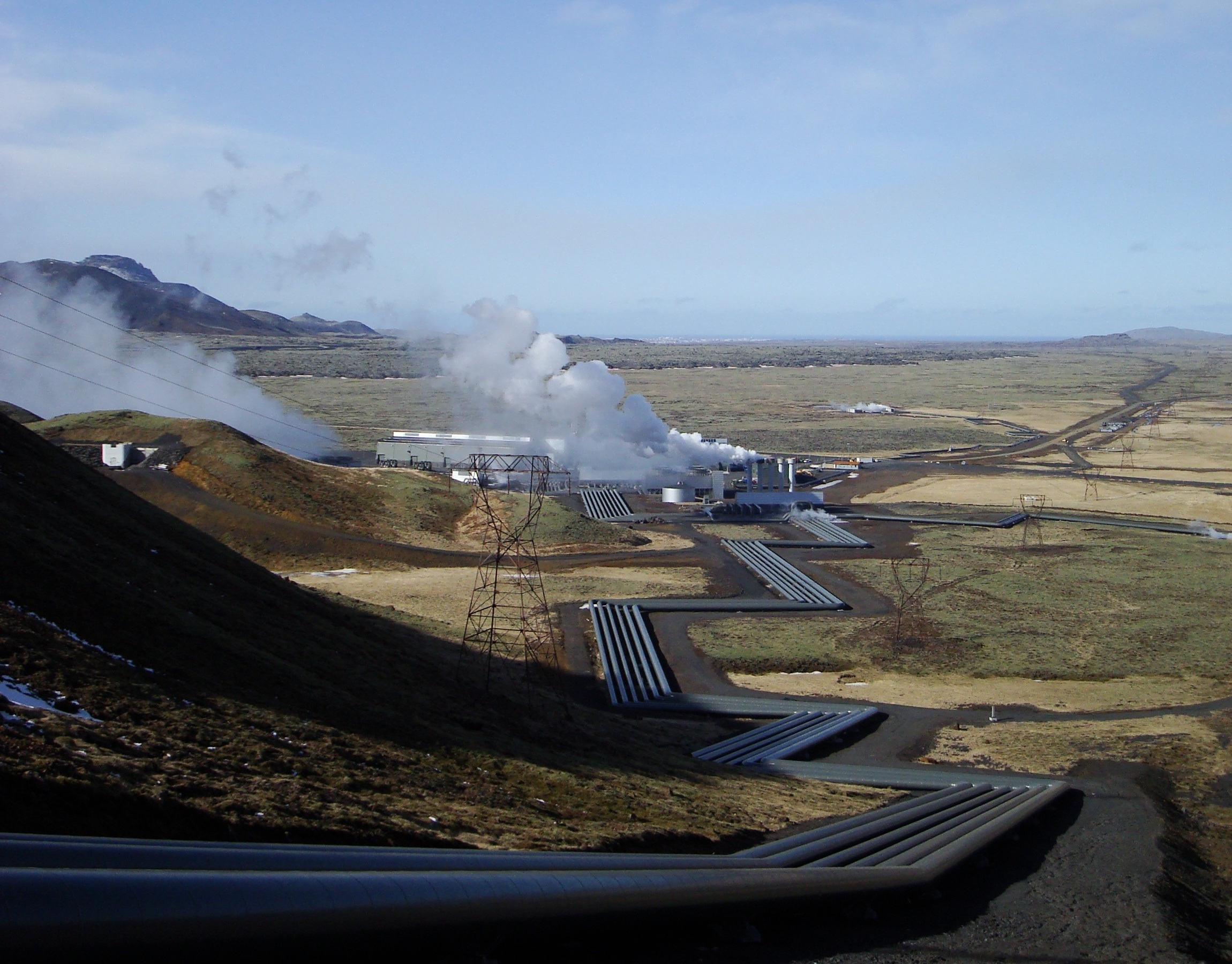
Hellisheidi Power Station in Iceland. Many of RG´s employers worked on developing one of the world’s largest geothermal facilities in the world in Hellisheidi, Iceland.

Reykjavik Geothermal Ltd (RG) is a geothermal development company that specifically identifies and targets high quality geothermal resources in combination with underserved power markets.

RG was founded in Iceland in 2008 by experienced geothermal management and science team, in all aspects of the geoscience, engineering, financing and management of geothermal development, exploration and plant construction.

RG has been verified by accredited management standards and authenticated systems and frameworks including ISO 9001. The Company has implemented ISO 14001 and OHSAS 18001 and these environmental and occupational health and safety systems are pending BSI audit. Furthermore the company has implemented ISO 26000 standard on social responsibility and the SA 8000 standard on social accountability.

Headquartered in Iceland, RG is owned by management and U.S. investors. It has offices in New York City in the US, Addis Ababa in Ethiopia and in Port Moresby in Papua New Guinea.

== See also ==
- Renewable energy in Iceland
