= Borkana River =

River In Ethiopia

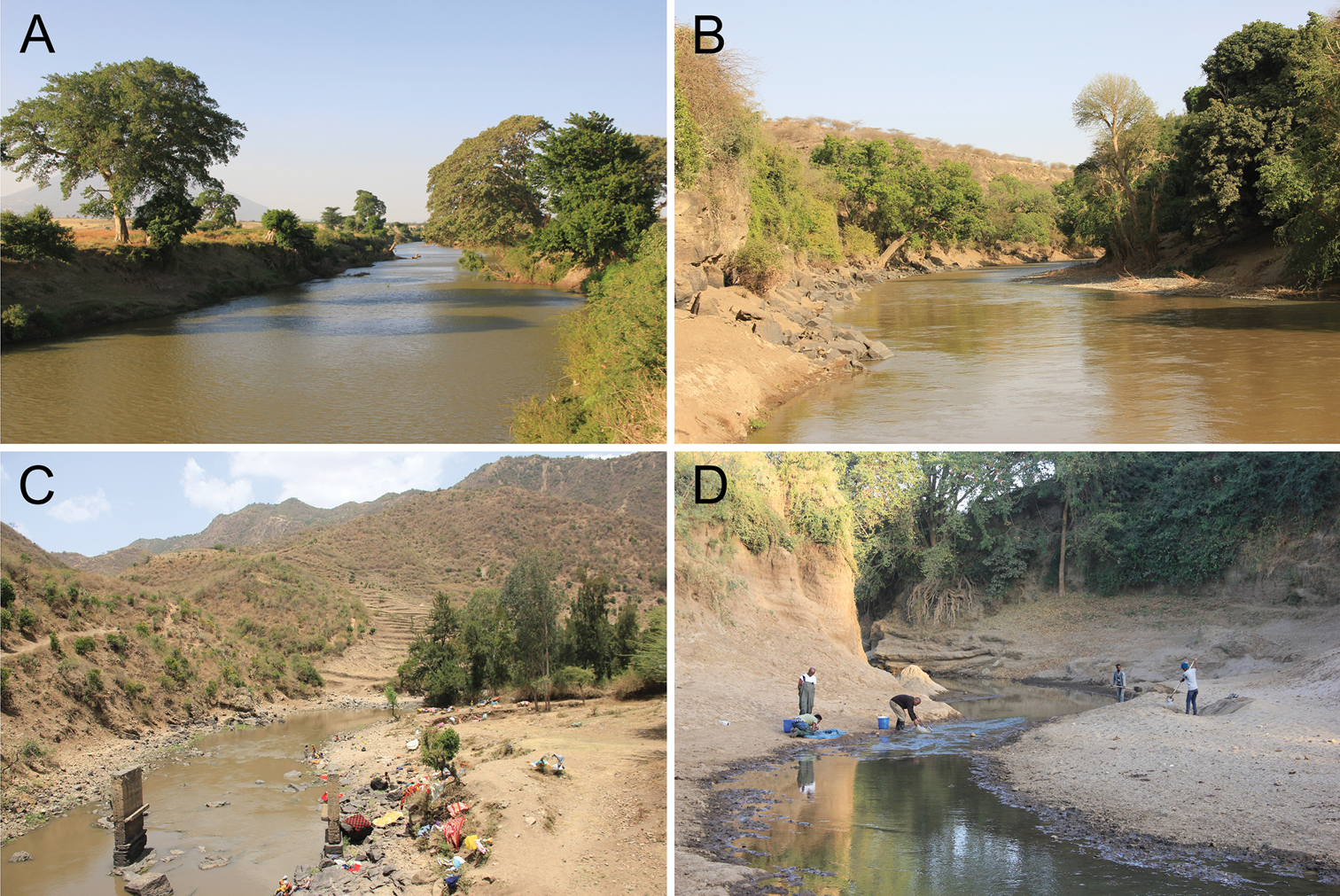
- Native name: Tshaffa (Oromo); ቦርከና ወንዝ (Amharic)

Location
- Country: Ethiopia
- Regions: Amhara, Afar

Physical characteristics
- Source: Ethiopian Highlands
  - location: Near Dessie
  - coordinates: 11°14′26″N 39°36′50″E
  - elevation: 2,745 m (9,006 ft)
- Mouth: Awash River
  - coordinates: 10°41′03″N 40°27′10″E
  - elevation: 556 m (1,824 ft)
- Length: 185 km (115 mi)
- Basin size: 3,279 km^{2} (1,266 sq mi)
- Discharge
  - location: Mouth
  - average: 14.35 m^{3}/s (507 cu ft/s)
  - minimum: 1.38 m^{3}/s (49 cu ft/s)
  - maximum: 80.8 m^{3}/s (2,850 cu ft/s)

Basin features
- Progression: Awash → Lake Abbe
- River system: Awash Basin
- Cities: Dessie, Kombolcha, Kemise
- Population: 1,200,000

Borkana River is a river of central Ethiopia. It is a left tributary of the Awash. Johann Ludwig Krapf records that it was called "Tshaffa" by the local Oromo people.

== See also ==
- Rivers of Ethiopia
