= Gabi Rasu =

Zone in Afar Region of Ethiopia

Coordinates: 10°0′N 40°30′E

- Zone
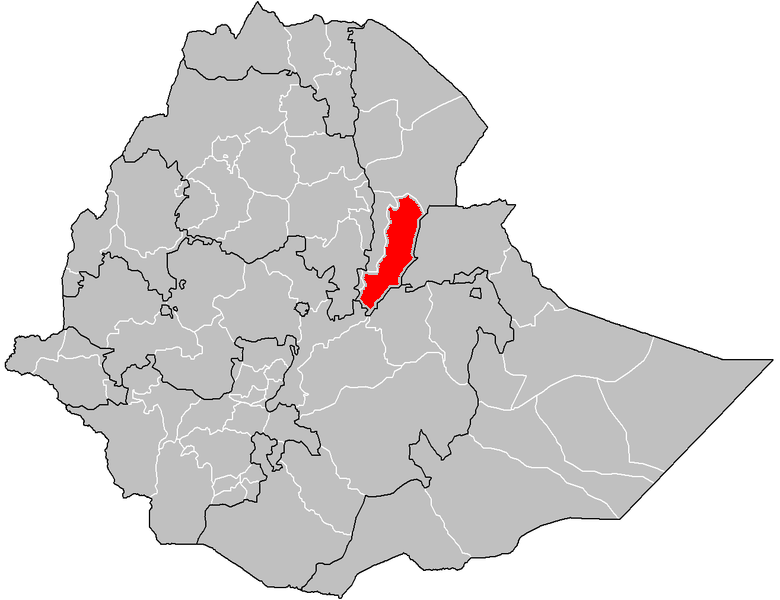
- Gabi Rasu location in Ethiopia
- Country: Ethiopia
- Region: Afar

Area
  - Total: 6,594.18 km^{2} (2,546.03 sq mi)

Population (2012 est.)
  - Total: 234,427
  - Density: 35.5506/km^{2} (92.0756/sq mi)

Gabi Rasu, also known as Administrative Zone 3, is a zone in the Afar Region of Ethiopia. This zone is bordered on the south by the Oromia Region, on the southwest by the Amhara Region, on the west by Hari Rasu, on the north by Awsi Rasu, and on the east by the Somali Region.

This zone covers most of the territory of the former Gobaad sultanate. Towns include Awash and Gewane. Rivers include the Awash and Germama. Gabi Rasu consists eight woredas and one town administration, including Gawane, Amibara, Galaqu, Hawaash Fantiqale, Hanruka, Dullacha, Argobba, and Hawash Subah.

== History ==
The Awash River flows through the south and western parts of this zone, periodically flooding during the June-to-September rainy season. During 1996, the river flooded parts of Bure Mudaytu and Gewane woredas, but a UNDP team dispatched to survey the area failed to find significant damage. However, in August 1999, a planned release of waters from the Koka Reservoir resulted in flooding by the Awash—although an investigation afterwards showed the flooding was caused by dike failures and silting of the Awash, especially around Melka Were. Approximately 5,000 hectares (19 sq mi) of cropland from 12 rural kebeles in Amibara and 3 rural kebeles in Dulecha were affected. The Awash flooded again 16 August 2006, displacing 15,000 people and damaging 400 hectares (1.5 sq mi) planted in cotton, corn, onions and sesame.

In June 2002, the Afar, the Issa Somali, and the Ittu Oromo engaged in armed clashes in Gewane, Amibara, and Awash Fentale woredas over drought-diminished grazing resources. As a result, the traditional division of work was ignored: women no longer tended livestock and men guarded their herds with weapons. Pastoral groups from this zone concentrated in the Awash lowlands, which forced pastoral groups from Hari Rasu to move west and compete with the Argobba.

== Demographics ==
Based on the 2007 Census conducted by the Central Statistical Agency of Ethiopia (CSA), this zone has a total population of 198,751, of whom 108,995 are men and 89,756 women. While 54,328 or 27.33% are urban inhabitants, a further 24,075 or 12.11% were pastoralists. The seven largest ethnic groups reported in Gabi Rasu were the Afar (64.78%), the Amhara (12.01%), the Argobba (10.72%), the Wolayta (4.05%), the Oromo (2.75%), the Hadiya (1.25%), and the Kambaata (1.19%). All other ethnic groups made up 3.25% of the population. The Afar language is spoken as a first language by 64.66% of the population, Amharic by 22.25%, Argobba by 5.42%, Wolaytta by (2.89%), and Oromo by (1.51%). The remaining 3.27% spoke all other primary languages reported. 81.3% of the population said they were Muslim, 13.8% were Orthodox Christians, and 4.45% were Protestants.

The 1996, the national census reported a total population for this Zone of 150,346, of whom 82,657 were men and 67,689 women; 36,929 or 24.56% of its population were urban dwellers at the time. The major ethnic groupings in 1996 were 70.8% Afar, 10.43% Amhara, 6.43% Argobba, 3.82% Oromo, and 3.14% Welayta. Of the school-age school-age children, 7.35% (8.22% male and 6.29% female) were currently attending school, which is higher than the Regional average; 19.84% of the total population over the age of 10 (22.75% male and 16.33% female) are reported to be literate.
