= Hari Rasu =

Zone in Afar Region of Ethiopia

Coordinates: 10°30′N 40°15′E

Hari Rasu (ሃሪ ረሱ)
- Zone
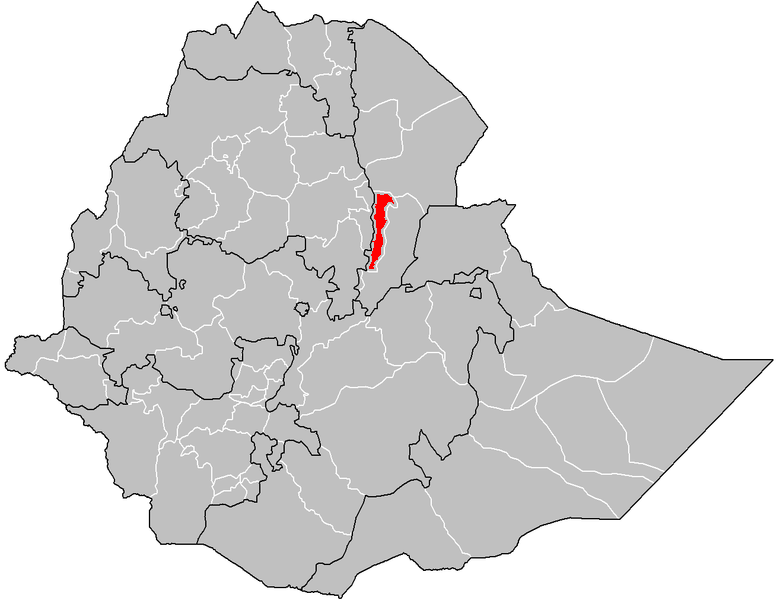
- Hari Rasu location in Ethiopia
- Country: Ethiopia
- Region: Afar

Area
  - Total: 5,945.41 km^{2} (2,295.54 sq mi)

Population (2007)
  - Total: 183,799
  - Density: 30.9144/km^{2} (80.0680/sq mi)

Hari Rasu, also known as Administrative Zone 5, is a zone in the Afar Region of Ethiopia. Stretching along the eastern base of the Ethiopian Highlands, this zone is bordered on the south and east by Gabi Rasu, on the west by the Amhara Region, and on the north by Awsi Rasu.

This Zone covers most of the area governed by the Afar Hari Rasu. Hari Rasu Administrative Zone Divided in to Five Woredas, Such us.

- Hadale'ela District
- Dawe District
- Talalak District
- Dalefage District
- Samurobi District

Mahi Rasu, also known as Administrative Zone 6, is a zone in the Afar Region of Ethiopia. Stretching along the eastern base of the Ethiopian Highlands, this zone is bordered on the east Djibouti by south Gabi Rasu, on the west by the Hari Rasu, and on the north by Awsi Rasu. This Zone covers most of the area governed by the Afar Hari Rasu.

Mahi Rasu Administrative Zone Divided in to Five Woredas, Such us.

- Garani District
- Kilalu District
- Yangudi District
- Sibaybi District
- Ada Ado District

== Demographics ==
Based on the 2007 Census conducted by the Central Statistical Agency of Ethiopia (CSA), this Zone has a total population of 183,799, of whom 105,321 are men and 78,478 women. While 12,263 or 6.67% are urban inhabitants, a further 49,551 or 26.96% were pastoralists. Two largest ethnic groups reported in Hari Rasu were the Afar (97.65%), and Amhara (1.7%); all other ethnic groups made up 0.65% of the population. Afar is spoken as a first language by 97.6%, Amharic by 1.8%; the remaining 0.6% spoke all other primary languages reported. 99.3% of the population said they were Muslim.

The 1996 national census reported a total population for this Zone of 282,960, of whom 165,221 were men and 117,739 women; none of its population were reported to be urban dwellers at the time. The major ethnic groupings in 1996 were 99.42% Afar, and 0.24% Amhara. Of the school-age school-age children, 0.26% (0.45% male and 0.00% female) were currently attending school, which is lower than the Regional average; 0.90% of the total population over the age of 10 (1.36% male and 0.26% female) are reported to be literate.

- Districts of under Hari Rasu Administrative Zone
- Hadale'ela District
- Dawe District
- TalalakDistrict
- DalefageDistrict
- SamurobiDistrict
