= List of districts in the Afar region =

Districts within Ethiopia

This is a list of the 37 woredas, or districts, and five city administration in the Afar region of Ethiopia, compiled from material on the Central Statistical Agency website.

== List of districts by zone ==
=== Independent districts/woredas ===
- Argobba Special Woreda^{*}

=== Zone 1 (Awsi Rasu) ===
- Afambo
- Asayita
- Chifra
- Dubti
- Elidar
- Kori
- Mille
- Ada'ar
- Garani
- Kilalu
- Semera Logia

=== Zone 2 (Kilbet Rasu) ===
- Abala
- Afdera
- Berhale
- Dallol
- Erebti
- Koneba
- Megale
- Bidu

=== Zone 3 (Gabi Rasu) ===
- Amibara
- Awash Fentale
- Bure Mudaytu
- Dulecha
- Gewane
- Argoba
- Awash Town
- canruka (Ethiopian District)
- Abida
- Sibaybi

=== Zone 4 (Fantena Rasu) ===
- Aura
- Ewa
- Gulina
- Teru
- Yalo

=== Zone 5 (Hari Rasu) ===
- Dalifage (formerly known as Artuma)
- Dewe
- Hadale'ela (formerly known as Fursi)
- Simurobi Gele'alo
- Telalak
- Yangudi

^{*} – formerly part of Afar Zone 3 (Gabi Rasu)

== See also ==
- Districts of Ethiopia
