= List of lakes of Ethiopia =

This is a list of lakes of Ethiopia, located completely or partially within the country's borders.

== Lakes ==
Name	Area (km²)	Elevation (MAMSL)	Type	Region	Coordinates	Remarks
Lake Abaya	1,162	1,285	Freshwater lake	Southern Nations, Nationalities, and Peoples' Region	6.4333°N 37.8833°E	
Lake Abbe	320	243	Salt lake	Afar Region	11.1666°N 41.7833°E	
Lake Abijatta	205	1,573	Salt lake	Oromia Region	7.6166°N 38.6°E	
Lake Afambo	35	339	Freshwater lake	Afar Region	11.4166°N 41.6833°E	
Lake Afrera	100	−102	Salt lake	Afar Region	13.2833°N 40.9166°E	
Lake Ashenge	20	2,409	Salt lake	Tigray Region	12.5805°N 39.5°E	
Lake Hawassa	129	1,686	Freshwater lake	Southern Nations, Nationalities, and Peoples' Region	7.0401°N 38.4879°E	
Lake Bario	22.16	339	-	Afar Region	11.3753°N 41.6258°E	
Lake Basaka	42.6	950	Salt lake	Oromia Region	8.8666°N 39.8666°E	
Lake Chamo	317	1,110	Freshwater lake	Southern Nations, Nationalities, and Peoples' Region	5.8333°N 37.55°E	
Lake Chew Bahir	343	570	Salt lake	Southern Nations, Nationalities, and Peoples' Region	4.7166°N 36.95°E	
Lake Tirba	1.5	2,224	Crater Lake	Amhara Region	9.5199°N 37.2159°E	
Lake Gummare	60	-	Freshwater lake	Afar Region	11.5333°N 41.6666°E	
Lake Hayq	23	2,030	Freshwater lake	Amhara Region	11.3333°N 39.7166°E	
Lake Hardibo	16	2,136	Freshwater lake	Amhara Region	11.2333°N 39.7716°E	
Lake Haramaya	-	2,010	Freshwater lake	Oromia Region	9.4049°N 42.0045°E	Dried out from 2011
Lake Kadabassa	-	562	-	Afar Region	10.203°N 40.4914°E	
Lake Karum	50	−120	Salt lake	Afar Region	14.0166°N 40.4166°E	
Koka Reservoir	180	1,595	Reservoir	Oromia Region	8.4333°N 39.0333°E	
Lake Langano	230	1,585	Freshwater lake	Oromia Region	7.6°N 38.7166°E	
Nigat Lake	1,874	155	Reservoir	Currently Amhara Region	11.2014°N 35.1088°E	from Grand Ethiopian Renaissance Dam, (2025)
Lake Shala	329	1,558	Salt lake	Oromia Region	7.4833°N 38.5333°E	
Lake Tana	3,060	1,788	Freshwater lake	Amhara Region	12°N 37.5°E	
Lake Turkana	6,405	361	Salt lake	Southern Nations, Nationalities, and Peoples' Region	3.5833°N 36.1166°E	Most of the lake is in Kenya
Lake Zway	440	1,636	Freshwater lake	Southern Nations, Nationalities, and Peoples' Region; Oromia	8°N 38.8333°E	
Lake Zengena	1	2,500	Freshwater lake	Amhara Region	10.9138°N 36.9666°E	Crater lake

== Lakes not confirmed with coordinates ==
- Lake Chelelektu
- Lake Gargori
- Lake Laitali

== See also ==
- Rift Valley lakes
