= Abala =

Abala may refer to:

== Places ==
- Abala, Benin
- Abala District, a district in the Republic of the Congo
- Abala, Nigeria, a town in Nigeria
- Abala, Niger, a town in Niger
- Abala, Ethiopia, a town in Ethiopia
- Abala (woreda), a district in Ethiopia named after this town
- Tabala (Lydia), an ancient settlement and bishopric in Lydia

== Other uses ==
- Abala (film), 1973
