= Afambo (woreda) =

District in Afar Region, Ethiopia

Coordinates: 11°15′N 41°40′E

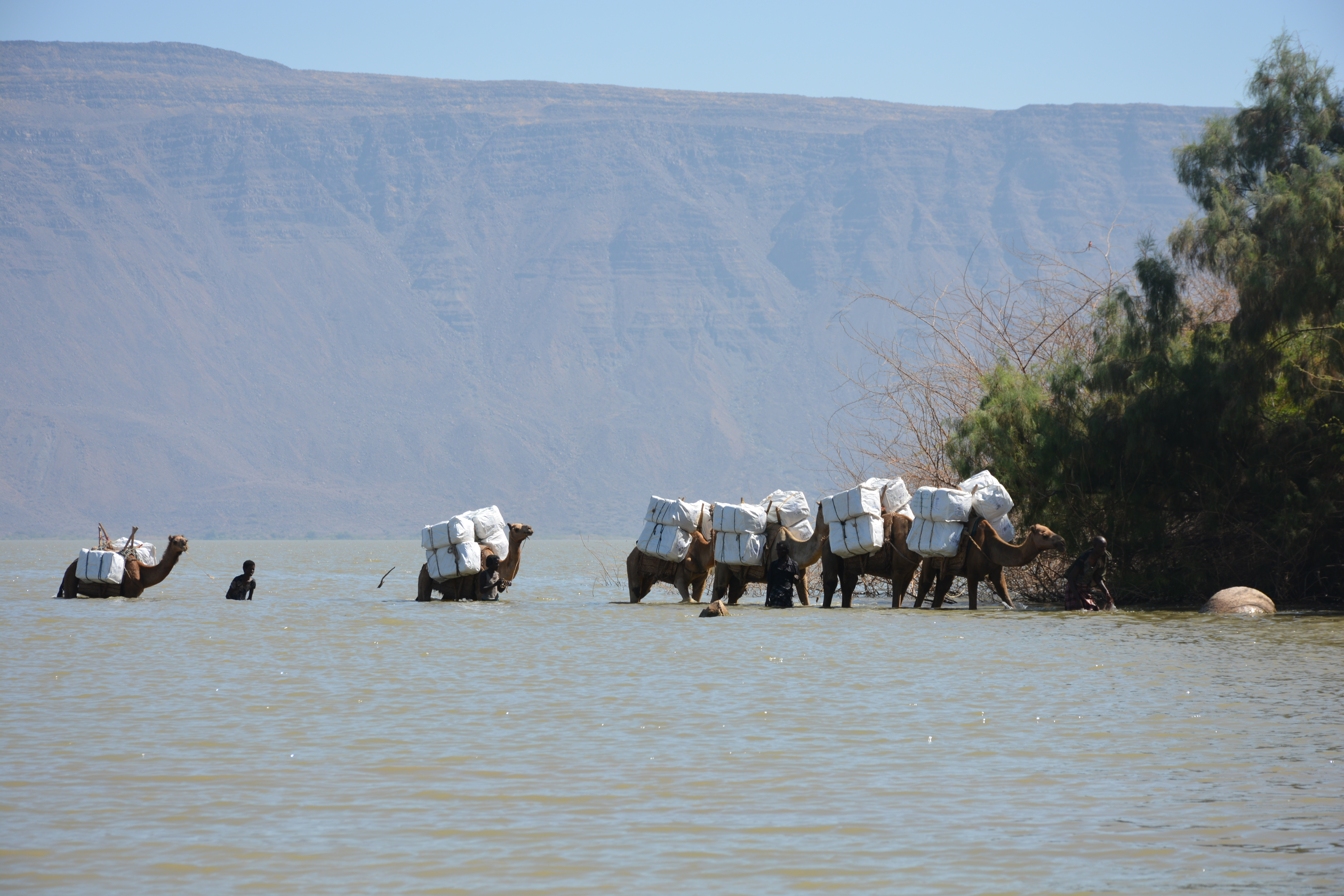
Camel caravans begin a two-day journey at the Awash river mouth in Afambo District

Afambo is a woreda in Awsi Rasu (Administrative Zone 1) of the Afar Region, Ethiopia. It is named after Lake Afambo, located at the border of this woreda with Asayita, near the international border with Djibouti. Part of the Administrative Zone 1, Afambo is bordered on the south by the Somali Region, on the west by Dubti, on the north by Asayita, and on the east by Djibouti. The largest town in this woreda is Afambo.

The average elevation in this woreda is around 404 meters (1325 feet) above sea level; the highest peak is Mount Dama Ali (1068 meters or 3504 feet). The only perennial river is the Awash, which passes through Lake Afambo, and a chain of lakes south and east of it: Laitali, Gummare, Bario, and Lake Abbe. As of 2008, Afambo has 79 kilometers (49 miles) of all-weather gravel road; around 22.33% of the total population has access to drinking water.

== Demographics ==
Based on the 2007 Census conducted by the Central Statistical Agency of Ethiopia (CSA), this woreda has a total population of 24,153, of whom 13,312 are men and 10,841 women; with an area of 1,258.97 square kilometers (486.09 square miles), Afambo has a population density of 19.18 people per square kilometer (49.69 people per square mile). While 822 or 3.40% are urban inhabitants, a further 6,529 or 27.03% are pastoralists. A total of 4,251 households were counted in this woreda, which results in an average of 5.7 persons to a household, and 4,322 housing units. 99.96% of the population said they were Muslim.

== Agriculture ==
A sample enumeration performed by the CSA in 2001 interviewed 894 farmers in this woreda, who held an average of 4.61 hectares (11.39 acres) of land. Of the 4.125 square kilometers (1.593 square miles) of private land surveyed, 58.71% was under cultivation, 4.44% pasture, 33.92% fallow, and 6.42% was devoted to all other uses. For the land under cultivation in this woreda, 43.95% was planted in cereals like maize and sorghum; the amount of land planted in pulses and vegetables is missing, but 40 hectares (99 acres) was planted in fruit trees, 0.09 hectares (0.22 acres) in bananas and 0.51 hectares (1.26 acres) in guavas. The CSA reports that 19.46% of the farmers only grow crops and 81.54% only raise livestock; the returns for those who raise both are missing. Land tenure in this woreda is distributed between 84.78% own their land, 1.13% rent, and the remaining 13.75% are held under other forms.
