= Abala (woreda) =

Coordinates: 13°30′N 40°00′E

Abala is one of the woredas in the Afar Region of Ethiopia. Part of the Administrative Zone 2, Abala is located at the base of the eastern escarpment of the Ethiopian Highlands, and bordered on the south by Megale, on the west by the Tigray Region, on the north by Berhale, on the northeast by Afdera, and on the east by Erebti. The major town in Abala is Abala.

== Demographics ==
Based on the 2007 Census conducted by the Central Statistical Agency of Ethiopia (CSA), this woreda has a total population of 37,963, of whom 20,486 are men and 17,477 women; with an area of 1,188.72 square kilometers (458.97 square miles), Abala has a population density of 31.94 people per square kilometer (82.71 people per square mile). While 10,301 or 27.13% are urban inhabitants, a further 5,552 or 14.62% are pastoralists. A total of 6,703 households were counted in this woreda, which results in an average of 5.7 persons to a household, and 6,855 housing units. 80.53% of the population said they were Muslim, and 19.35% were Orthodox Christians. The predominant ethnic group in this woreda are the Afar.
