= Yalo (woreda) =

Coordinates: 12°40′N 40°00′E

Yalo is one of the Districts of Ethiopia, or woredas, in the Afar Region of Ethiopia. Part of the Administrative Zone 4, Yalo is located at the base of the eastern escarpment of the Ethiopian Highlands, and bordered on the south by Gulina, on the west by the Tigray Region, on the north by the Administrative Zone 2, and on the east by Teru. The major town in Yalo is Dibina.

Based on the 2007 Census conducted by the Central Statistical Agency of Ethiopia (CSA), this woreda has a total population of 47,468, of whom 27,319 are men and 20,149 women; with an area of 822.75 square kilometers (317.67 square miles), Yalo has a population density of 57.69 people per square kilometer (149.43 people per square mile). While 790 or 1.66% are urban inhabitants, a further 9,730 or 20.50% are pastoralists. A total of 7,901 households were counted in this woreda, which results in an average of 6.0 persons to a household, and 8,105 housing units. 99.25% of the population said they were Muslim.
