= Aura (woreda) =

Woreda in Ethiopia

Coordinates: 12°15′N 40°30′E

Aura is a woreda in Afar Region, Ethiopia. Part of the Administrative Zone 4, Aura is bordered on the southwest by Ewa, on the west by Gulina, on the north by Teru, and on the east by Administrative Zone 1; the Logiya River defines part of its southeastern boundary. The largest settlement in Aura is Derayitu.

== Overview ==
The average elevation in this woreda is 459 meters (1506 feet) above sea level. As of 2008, Awra has 65 kilometers (40 miles) of dry-weather road; about 29.02% of the total population has access to drinking water.

A notable landmark in Awra is the plain of Karbahi, the location of two recent fissure eruptions, one on 12 August 2007 and more recently 29 June 2009. This is one incident in the separation of continental plates in the Afar Depression. The eruptions at Karbahi are being studied by the Afar Rift Consortium, a joint project of geologists in Great Britain working with other scientists in U.S., France and New Zealand, and most importantly, Ethiopia.

== Demographics ==
Based on the 2007 Census conducted by the Central Statistical Agency of Ethiopia (CSA), this woreda has a total population of 34,604, of whom 18,999 are men and 15,605 women; with an area of 2,317.86 square kilometers (894.93 square miles), Awra has a population density of 14.93 people per square kilometer (38.67 people per square mile). While 1,651 or 4.77% are urban inhabitants, a further 22,140 or 63.98% are pastoralists. A total of 6,394 households were counted in this woreda, which results in an average of 5.4 persons to a household, and 6,507 housing units. 99.46% of the population said they were Muslim.
