= Elidar (woreda) =

District in Afar Region, Ethiopia

Coordinates: 12°15′N 41°45′E

Elidar (also spelled Eli Da'ar) is a woreda in Afar Region, Ethiopia. Part of the Awsi Rasu (Administrative Zone 1), Elidar is bordered on the south by the Awash River which separates it from Asayita, on the west by Dubti, on the northwest by Kori, on the north by the Administrative Zone 2, on the northeast by Eritrea, and on the east by Djibouti. Towns in Elidar include Bure, Diche Oto, Elidar and Manda.

== Overview ==
The highest points in Elidar include Mount Alayta (1501 meters or 4925 feet) and Manda-Inakir (over 600 meters or 1,968 feet).

In early 1976, Derg soldiers led by Habib Mahammad Yayyo clashed with Afar fighters at Do'oroita near Elidar, with casualties on both sides. From documents captured by the soldiers, they learned that this group, who shortly afterwards organized themselves as the Afar National Liberation Movement, was leftist in political orientation and unaffiliated with the Afar Liberation Front of Sultan Alimirah Hanfadhe, and subsequently brokered a peace treaty with them which led the Derg to include a clause in their Program for the National Democratic Revolution which recognized the rights of the nationalities of Ethiopia.

On 4 February 2007, the Afar Regional Cabinet approved the division of this woreda, creating a new woreda out of the northwestern part next to Administrative Zone 2 to the border with Eritrea, centered on Biru.

== Demographics ==
Based on the 2007 Census conducted by the Central Statistical Agency of Ethiopia (CSA), this woreda has a total population of 58,087, of whom 31,780 are men and 26,307 women; with an area of 11,636.48 square kilometers (4492.87 square miles), Elidar has a population density of 4.99 people per square kilometer (12.93 people per square mile). This total also includes an estimate for the inhabitants of 8 rural kebeles, which were not counted; they were estimated to have 21,410 inhabitants. While 9,732 or 16.75% are urban inhabitants, a further 23,940 or 41.21% were pastoralists. A total of 10,479 households were counted in this woreda, which results in an average of 5.5 persons to a household, and 10,589 housing units. 97.24% of the population said they were Muslim, and 2.63% were Orthodox Christians.
