= Ewa (woreda) =

Coordinates: 12°00′N 40°10′E

Ewa is one of the Districts of Ethiopia, or woredas in the Afar Region of Ethiopia. Part of the Administrative Zone 4, Ewa is located near the base of the eastern escarpment of the Ethiopian Highlands, and bordered on the south by the Administrative Zone 1, on the west by the Amhara Region, on the north by Gulina, and on the east by Aura; part of its boundary with Zone 1 is defined by the Logiya River. The major settlement in Ewa is Alele Subula.

Based on the 2007 Census conducted by the Central Statistical Agency of Ethiopia (CSA), this woreda has a total population of 47,203, of whom 26,437 are men and 20,766 women; with an area of 1,463.89 square kilometers (565.21 square miles), Ewa has a population density of 32.24 people per square kilometer (83.51 people per square mile). While 1,237 or 2.62% are urban inhabitants, a further 26,913 or 57.02% are pastoralists. A total of 7,921 households were counted in this woreda, which results in an average of 6.0 persons to a household, and 8,217 housing units. 99.81% of the population said they were Muslim.
