= Elidar =

Place in Afar Region, Ethiopia

Elidar ኤሊዳር
- Town
- Location in Ethiopia
- Coordinates: 12°3′N 41°55′E
- Country: Ethiopia
- Region: Afar
- Zone: Administrative Zone 1

Population (2005)
  - Total: 2,228 (est)

Elidar (Amharic: ኤሊዳር) is a town in north-eastern Ethiopia. Located in Administrative Zone 1 of the Afar Region, in the angle formed by the border with Djibouti to the south, and Eritrea to the northeast. It has a latitude and longitude of 12°3′N 41°55′E with an elevation of 418 meters above sea level. Elidar is named for the salt pan that occupies the eastern end of Elidar woreda.

In 2005, this town had an estimated total population of 2228, of whom 1232 were males and 996 were females.

== History ==
Elidar existed at least as early as the 1930s, the period the Swiss wife of an Italian engineer recalled visiting a military fort there in her memoirs. Philip Briggs described Elidar (which he calls "Dobi") 60 years later as "little more than a collection of rickety shacks that provide shelter from the sun and sell lukewarm soda and beer."

During the Eritrean-Ethiopian War, displaced Afar and non-Afar people from Asseb and Bure took refuge at Elidar, before being transported to Logiya and Mille, both of which had better resources to handle these refugees. Some of the displaced people were sheltered at the local school.
