= Diche Oto =

Coordinates: 11.9025°N 41.5843°E

- Interactive map of Diche Oto
- Country: Ethiopia
- Region: Afar Region
- Zone: Administrative Zone 1

Population (2005)
  - Total: 1,998 (est)

Cayyu(Diche Oto) is a town in north-eastern Ethiopia, located in Administrative Zone 1 of the Afar Region. During the Italian occupation, the settlement was known as Diciotto, Italian for "eighteen".

Based on figures from the Central Statistical Agency in 2005, the town had an estimated total population of 1,998 of whom 1,131 were males and 867 were females. It is one of four towns in Elidar woreda.

Philip Briggs has described Diche Oto as "a rather odd settlement of brightly painted corrugated iron buildings with large balconies. As the last Ethiopian town before the Djibouti border, it is a popular stopover with truck drivers, and has consequently acquired an unexpectedly shifty, seedy atmosphere."
