= Afambo =

Afambo may refer to:

- Afambo (Ethiopian District)
- Lake Afambo
