= Megale (woreda) =

Coordinates: 13°10′N 40°00′E

Megale is one of the Districts of Ethiopia, or woredas, in the Afar Region of Ethiopia. Part of the Administrative Zone 2, Megale is located at the base of the eastern escarpment of the Ethiopian Highlands, and bordered on the south by the Administrative Zone 4, on the west by the Tigray Region, on the north by Abala, and on the east by Erebti. The administrative center is at Nehile.

The Leile hot springs is a notable point of interest, which is visited not only by local residents and people from the Tigray Region, but by inhabitants from the Amhara Region, who arrive by foot. Rivers in this woreda include the Erebti, a stream that flows east from the Ethiopian Highlands into the Afar Depression.

== Demographics ==
Based on the 2007 Census conducted by the Central Statistical Agency of Ethiopia (CSA), this woreda has a total population of 28,113, of whom 15,340 are men and 12,773 women; with an area of 1,548.33 square kilometers (597.81 square miles), Megale has a population density of 18.16 people per square kilometer (47.03 people per square mile). While 703 or 2.50% are urban inhabitants, a further 8,551 or 30.42% are pastoralists. A total of 4,714 households were counted in this woreda, which results in an average of 6.0 persons to a household, and 4,794 housing units. 99.22% of the population said they were Muslim.
