= Dibina =

Town in Ethiopia

Coordinates: 12°23′22″N 39°52′52″E

Dibina is a town in north-eastern Ethiopia, located in Administrative Zone 4 of the Afar Region. This may be the "Debene" W.C. Harris mentions, a small village he passed through in mid-June 1841 on his diplomatic mission to Shewa.

Based on figures from the Central Statistical Agency in 2005, Dibina has an estimated total population of 1,370, of whom 717 are men and 653 are women. The 1994 census reported this town had a total population of 937 of whom 459 were men and 478 were women. It is the largest town in Yalo woreda.
