= Koneba (woreda) =

District in Afar Region, Ethiopia

Coordinates: 14°00′N 39°50′E

Konnaba, in English written as Konaba, is a woreda in Afar Region, Ethiopia.

A triangle-shaped district in the Administrative Zone 2, Konaba is located near the base of the eastern escarpment of the Ethiopian Highlands, and is bordered on the west by the Tigray Region, on the north by Dallol, and on the east by Berhale. Koneba woreda has 7 kebeles names by koneba ena balbal, adad ena farasdage, gu'a ena kedahara, uruh ena ede gahnu, fisho, wahdes and alhena. Koneba is the historical woreda in afar it has Gold.

The major towns in Koneba are Koneba and Farasdage.

The average elevation in this woreda is 1150 meters (3773 feet) above sea level. As of 2008, Koneba has 38 kilometers (24 miles) of all-weather gravel roads and 79 kilometers (49 miles) of community roads; about 13% of the total population has access to drinking water.

== Demographics ==
Based on the 2007 Census conducted by the Central Statistical Agency of Ethiopia (CSA), this woreda has a total population of 54,198, of whom 29,355 are men and 24,843 women; with an area of 483.16 square kilometers (186.55 square miles), Koneba has a population density of 112.17 people per square kilometer (290.53 people per square mile). While 3,031 or 5.59% are urban inhabitants, a further 366 or 0.68% are pastoralists. A total of 7,698 households were counted in this woreda, which results in an average of 7.0 persons to a household, and 7,875 housing units. 99.35% of the population said they were Muslim.
