= Teru (woreda) =

Coordinates: 12°45′N 40°20′E

Teru is one of the Districts of Ethiopia, or woredas, in the Afar Region of Ethiopia. Part of the Administrative Zone 4, Teru is bordered on the south by Aura, on the southwest by Gulina, on the west by Yalo, and on the north and east by the Administrative Zone 2. The major settlement in this woreda is Alelo.

== Overview ==
There are two rivers in this woreda, the Awra and Megale, but as of 2004, they have "changed their course and ... [their] water disappears in deep cracks in the ground". Deforestation is a problem in Teru. There are two roads in the woreda, but both are in poor condition. Debeha hot springs in the woreda is said to have high potential for geothermal power generation. The tallest point in Teru is the volcano Mount Dabbahu (1442 meters or 4731 feet), which erupted in 2005. 'Teru' is also the title of a ballad composed by saxophonist Wayne Shorter.

Education in Teru consists of 4 schools, where the first four grades are taught; there are a total of 304 students of whom 22 are female. There are a total of 10 teachers, 3 of whom teach in Afar. Of the 4 schools, 3 were constructed by Ethiopian Social Rehabilitation and Development Fund and one by the community.

On 29 September 2005, a 5.5 magnitude earthquake struck Boyna and Dabbahu kebeles in Teru. Because this earthquake caused hot springs in the area to erupt with enormous clouds of steam, locals at first believed this was a volcanic eruption. The fault that moved was measured as being 35 kilometers (22 miles) long. No one was killed, but by 21 October 11,000 people were reported as having fled the affected areas and taking refuge in three camps.

== Demographics ==
Based on the 2007 Census conducted by the Central Statistical Agency of Ethiopia (CSA), this woreda has a total population of 67,753, of whom 39,727 are men and 28,026 women; with an area of 5,792.85 square kilometers (2236.63 square miles), Teru has a population density of 11.70 people per square kilometer (30.29 people per square mile). While 1,838 or 2.71% are urban inhabitants, a further 37,608 or 55.51% are pastoralists. A total of 9,983 households were counted in this woreda, which results in an average of 6.8 persons to a household, and 10,511 housing units. 99.9% of the population said they were Muslim.
