= Ada'ar (woreda) =

- District
- Location within Ethiopia
- Coordinates: 11°20′N 40°20′E
- Country: Ethiopia
- Region: Afar
- Zone: One (Awsi Rasu)

Ada'ar Woreda is one of woredas found in Zone 1 of the Afar Region in Ethiopia.

Ada’ar Woreda is found in Awsi Rasu (Administrative Zone 1) of the Afar Region of Ethiopia. The District is bordered by Mile (east), Chifra (northwest) and Dewe (southeast) districts of the Afar Region and Bati (west) and Telalak (southwest) districts of the Amhara Region.

The District is administratively divided into 13 kebeles. According to Ada’ar District Administration, the total human population of the District is 59,637. According to Ada’ar District Pastoral, Agriculture and Rural Development Office, livestock population of the District in 2009 was estimated to be 683,977, of which cattle had the highest population (166,964), followed by sheep (164,857) and goat (329,714).

== See also ==
- Districts of Ethiopia
