= Gulina (woreda) =

Coordinates: 12°15′N 40°00′E

Gulina is one of the Districts of Ethiopia, or woredas, in the Afar Region of Ethiopia. Part of the Administrative Zone 4, Gulina is located near the base of the eastern escarpment of the Ethiopian Highlands, and bordered on the south by Ewa, on the west by the Amhara Region, on the north by Yalo, on the northeast by Teru, and on the east by Aura. The administrative center of Gulina, and Zone 4, is Kaluwan.

The highest peak in this woreda is the active volcano Dalaffilla (613 meters or 2011 feet). Rivers include the Fokissa, Galbate, and Gulina Rivers. Gulina has one of the higher rates of tree cover of any woreda in the Afar Region—4.2%. As of 2008, Gulina has 123 kilometers (76 miles) of all-weather road; about 29% of the total population has access to drinking water. However, the all-weather road would be more useful there were also a bridge over the Gulina river; local merchants complain that they had to transport goods on the shoulders of people over the river, which increased the cost of every quintal of goods by 8 Birr.

== Demographics ==
Based on the 2007 Census conducted by the Central Statistical Agency of Ethiopia (CSA), this woreda has a total population of 49,794, of whom 28,259 are men and 21,535 women; with an area of 805.40 square kilometers (310.96 square miles), Gulina has a population density of 61.83 people per square kilometer (160.27 people per square mile). While 3,925 or 7.88% are urban inhabitants, a further 22,300 or 44.78% are pastoralists. A total of 7,552 households were counted in this woreda, which results in an average of 6.6 persons to a household, and 7,820 housing units. 99.54% of the population said they were Muslim.
