= Asayita (woreda) =

District in Afar Region, Ethiopia

Coordinates: 11°45′N 41°30′E

Asayita is a woreda in Afar Region, Ethiopia. Part of the Administrative Zone 1, Asayita is bordered on the south by Afambo, on the west by Dubti, then on the north by the Awash River which separates it from Elidar, and on the east by Djibouti. The major town in Asayita is Asayita.

Part of the shoreline of Lake Gargori lies within the boundaries of this woreda.

== Demographics ==
Based on the 2007 Census conducted by the Central Statistical Agency of Ethiopia (CSA), this woreda has a total population of 50,803, of whom 27,284 are men and 23,519 women; with an area of 1,678.28 square kilometers (647.99 square miles), Asayita has a population density of 30.27 people per square kilometer (78.40 people per square mile). While 16,052 or 31.60% are urban inhabitants, a further 9,358 or 18.42% are pastoralists. A total of 11,096 households were counted in this woreda, which results in an average of 4.6 persons to a household, and 11,404 housing units. 95.12% of the population said they were Muslim, and 4.61% were Orthodox Christians.

== Agriculture ==
A sample enumeration performed by the CSA in 2001 interviewed 3036 farmers in this woreda, who held an average of 1.78 hectares (4.4 acres) of land. Of the 5.39 square kilometers (2.08 square miles) of private land surveyed, 71.59% was under cultivation, 1.22% pasture, 31.06% fallow, and 4.54% was devoted to other uses; the percentage in woodland was missing. For the land under cultivation in this woreda, 66.21% is planted in cereals like maize; none of the land was planted in pulses and vegetables, but 9 hectares (22.24 acres) was planted in fruit trees, 0.81 hectares (2 acres) in bananas and 0.41 hectares (1.01 acres) in guavas. 9.95% of the farmers both raise crops and livestock, while 25.79% only grow crops and 64.26% only raise livestock. Land tenure in this woreda is distributed between 66.49% own their land, 14.09% rent, and the remaining 19.42% are held under other forms of tenure.
