= Dallol (woreda) =

District in Afar Region, Ethiopia

Coordinates: 14°15′N 40°00′E

Dallol is a woreda in Afar Region, Ethiopia. This woreda is named for the former mining settlement of Dallol, which set the record for the hottest inhabited place on Earth, with an average temperature of 34 °C (92°F). Located at the northernmost point of the Administrative Zone 2, Dallol's territory includes part of the Afar Depression. This woreda is bordered on the south by Koneba, on the west by the Tigray Region, on the north by Eritrea, and on the east and south by Berhale. Detailed information is not available for the settlements in this woreda.

The average elevation in this woreda is 660 meters (2165 feet) above sea level; high points include Mount Hayle, Mountain Asta-Ale, Mountain Dayma and Mount Dabshado, which are part of the Ethiopian Highlands. Rivers include the Ragali River and La'asa River. As of 2008, Afambo has 150 kilometers (93 miles) of all-weather gravel road; about 22.33% of the total population has access to drinking water.

== Demographics ==
Based on the 2007 Census conducted by the Central Statistical Agency of Ethiopia (CSA), this woreda has a total population of 83,930, of whom 46,973 are men and 36,957 women; with an area of 2,291.18 square kilometers (884.63 square miles), Dallol has a population density of 36.63 people per square kilometer (94.88 people per square mile). While 1,757 or 2.09% are urban inhabitants, a further 1,544 or 1.84% are pastoralists. A total of 13,006 households were counted in this woreda, which results in an average of 6.5 persons to a household, and 13,281 housing units. 96.73% of the population said they were Muslim, and 3.21% were Orthodox Christians.
