= Abala (film) =

- Directed by: Thoppil Bhasi
- Starring: Madhu; Jayabharathi; KPAC Lalitha; Adoor Bhasi
- Music by: V. Dakshinamoorthy
- Release date: 12 November 1973
- Country: India
- Language: Malayalam

Abala is a 1973 Indian Malayalam film, directed by Thoppil Bhasi. The film stars Madhu, Jayabharathi, KPAC Lalitha and Adoor Bhasi in the lead roles. The film has musical score by V. Dakshinamoorthy.

== Cast ==
- Madhu
- Jayabharathi
- KPAC Lalitha
- Adoor Bhasi
- Sankaradi
- Bahadoor
- Sreelatha Namboothiri
- T. R. Omana
- M. G. Soman
- Vijayakumar

== Soundtrack ==
The music was composed by V. Dakshinamoorthy and the lyrics were written by Sreekumaran Thampi, Ashwathy, S. K. Nair, Kottayathu Thamburan, Puthukkad Krishnakumar and Thunchathezhuthachan.

No.	Song	Singers	Lyrics	Length (m:ss)
1	"Annarkkanna"	S. Janaki	Sreekumaran Thampi	
2	"Ennini Darsanam"	Kalyani Menon	Ashwathy	
3	"Mangala Darshana Daayike"	K. J. Yesudas	Maharshi Puthukkad Krishnakumar	
4	"Manjil Neeraadum"	K. J. Yesudas	Sreekumaran Thampi	
5	"Pathivrithayaakanam"	S. Janaki	Maharshi Puthukkad Krishnakumar	
6	"Priyamodu Paarthanu"	Kalamandalam Sukumaran, Kalyani Menon	Ashwathy, Kottayathu Thamburan	
7	"Srishtikarthaave"	Kalyani Menon	Thunchathezhuthachan	
