= Lake Bario =

Lake in Ethiopia

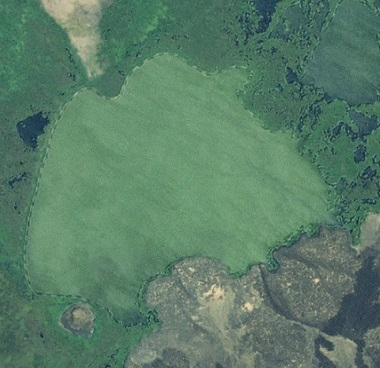

- Location within Ethiopia
- Location: eastern end of the Afar Region
- Coordinates: 11°22′N 41°36′E
- Primary inflows: Awash River
- Basin countries: Ethiopia

Lake Bario is one of a chain of lakes into which the Awash River empties its waters. It is located at the eastern end of the Afar Region of Ethiopia. Lake Bario lies in the middle of a swamp, through which it receives its inflow from Lake Afambo to the northeast. Its outflow is on its southern side, which circles around Mount Dama Ali to empty into Lake Abbe.
