= Djibouti–Ethiopia border =

International borders

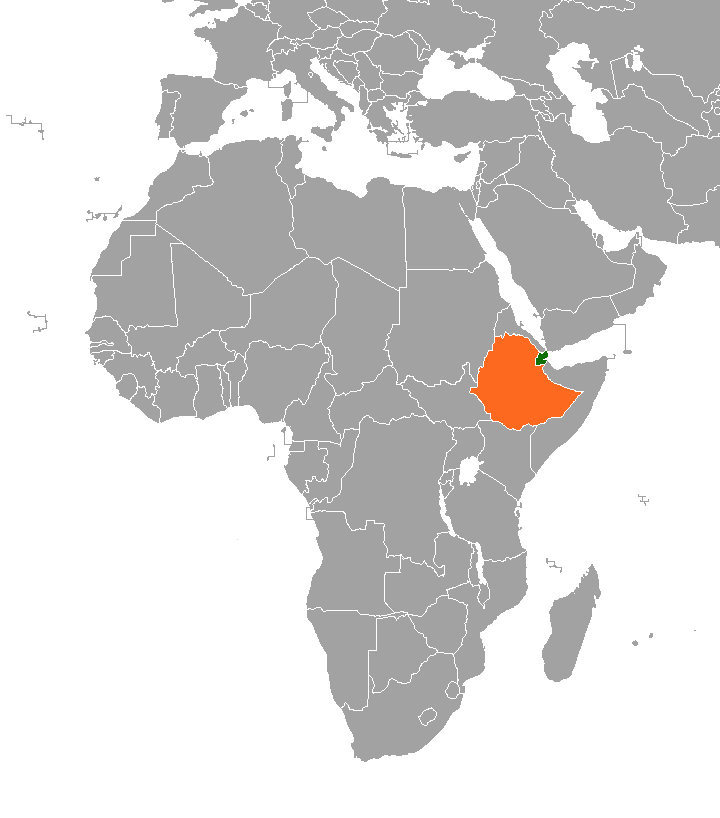
Map of Djibouti and Ethiopia

The Djibouti–Ethiopia border was formed during the 19th century via the formation of French Somaliland corresponding to the Ethiopian Empire in 1897. In 1950s, the frontier received significant demarcation from joint French–Ethiopian boundary commission. The modern Djibouti was bounded by 375 kilometers from tripoint of Eritrea on the mountain of Mousa Ali to the tripoint with Somalia, thus has favorable relations with Ethiopia. The border is essential for trading system for both countries where 97% import and export conducted and the Ethio-Djibouti corridor dominated the trading system of IGAD region with other routes such as Port Sudan, Berbera and Mombasa being of limited importance.

== Overview ==
The Ethiopia–Djibouti border stretches 375 kilometers from tripoint of Eritrea on the mountain of Mousa Ali to the tripoint with Somalia. It is primarily based on the formation of French Somaliland and the Ethiopian Empire in 1897. In the early 1950, the frontier received substantive demarcation by a joint of French–Ethiopian boundary commission. The modern Djibouti and Ethiopia's boundary shares no disputed territories, and thus have a good relation.

There is substantial cross-border trading involving long-standing economic, commercial and cultural relations. This strengthens the two countries' bilateral relations and achieves legal trade flow in accordance with international trade law. Following the first joint border trade committee meeting on 27–30 April 2022, there was a small-scale border trade between the borders, driven by the need to identify and resolve challenges facing implementation of the Djibouti–Ethiopia Border Trade Protocol signed in 2015. The Ethio–Djibouti corridor is important because it played a major role in trade facilitation in the IGAD region, accounting 95% of exports and imports, with other routes (e.g., Port Sudan, Berbera and Mombasa) being of limited importance.

On 20 September 2020, the new entry point of the corridor was opened near the town Balho at the Northern border to Djibouti. Aside from the border posts in Galafi at the Western border to the Djibouti and Dewele in the southwest, it is the third official entry point between the two countries. In August 2022, COMESA announced to fund the Ethio-Djibouti corridor with 3.2 million euros.
