= Lake Abbe =

Lake on the border of Djibouti and Ethiopia

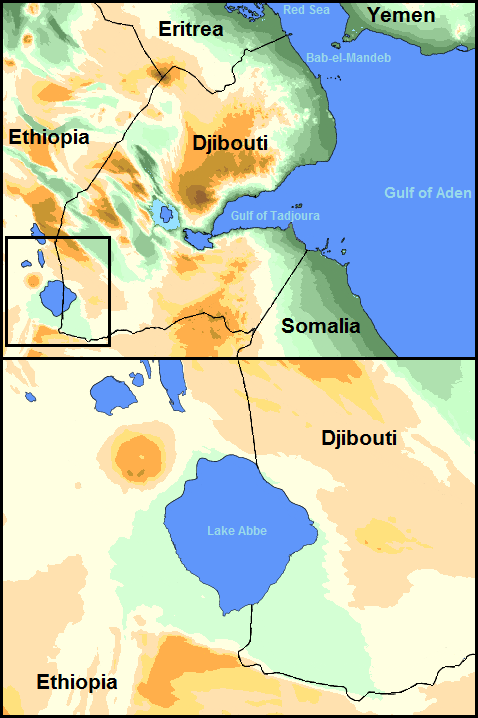

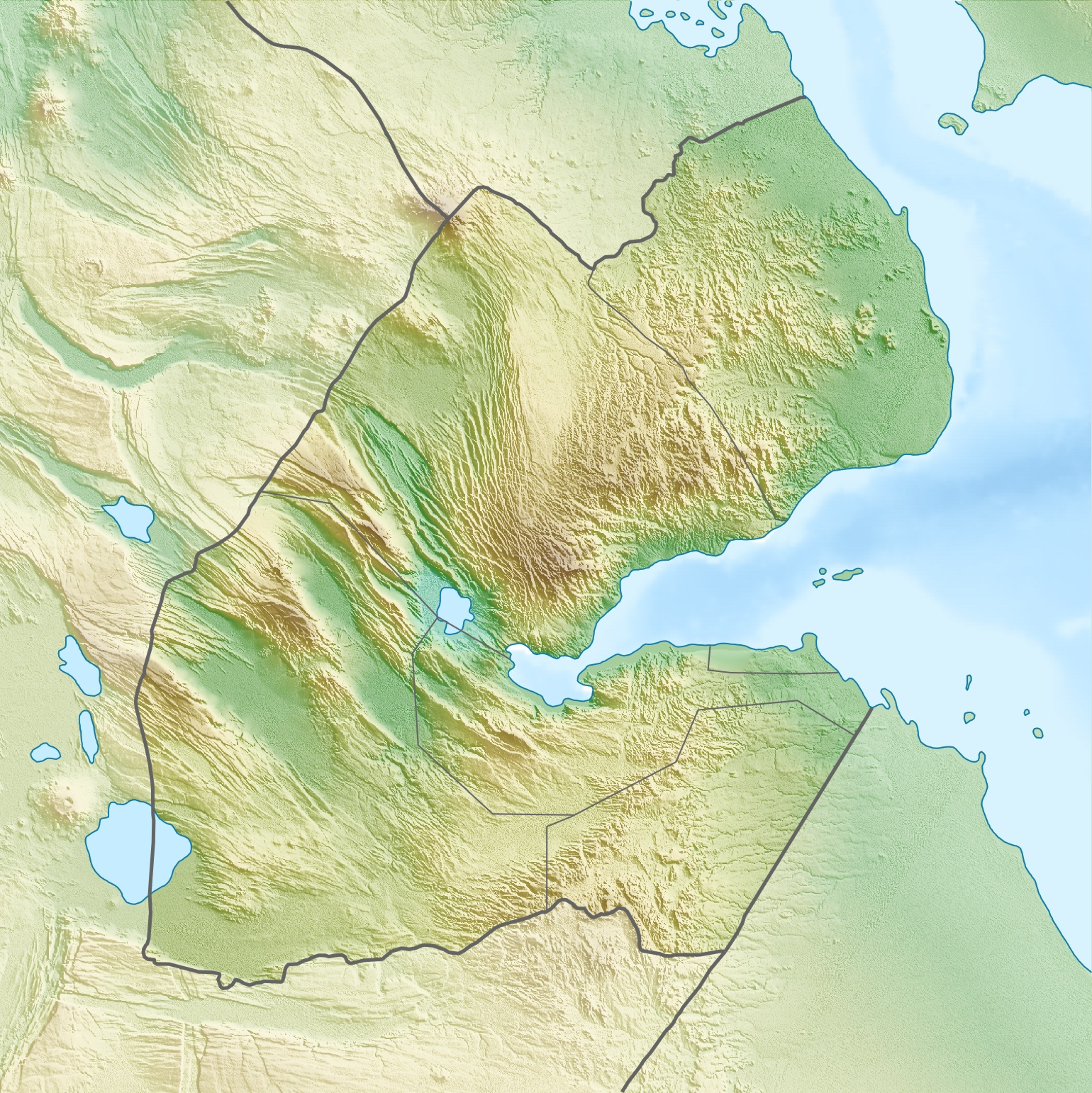
- Location within Djibouti
- Location: Ethiopia–Djibouti border
- Coordinates: 11°10′N 41°47′E
- Type: Salt lake
- Primary inflows: Awash River
- Primary outflows: None
- Basin countries: Djibouti, Ethiopia
- Max. length: 17 km (11 mi)
- Max. width: 19 km (12 mi)
- Surface area: 320 km^{2} (120 sq mi)
- Average depth: 8.6 metres (28 ft)
- Max. depth: 37 metres (121 ft)
- Surface elevation: 243 metres (797 ft)

Lake Abbe, also known as Lake Abhe Bad, is a salt lake, lying on the Ethiopia-Djibouti border. It is one of a chain of six connected lakes, which also includes (from north to south) lakes Gargori, Laitali, Gummare, Bario and Afambo. The lake is the ultimate destination of the Awash River, which is at the center of the Afar Triangle. Lake Abbe is considered one of the most inaccessible areas of the earth. The water itself is known for its flamingos.

== Overview ==
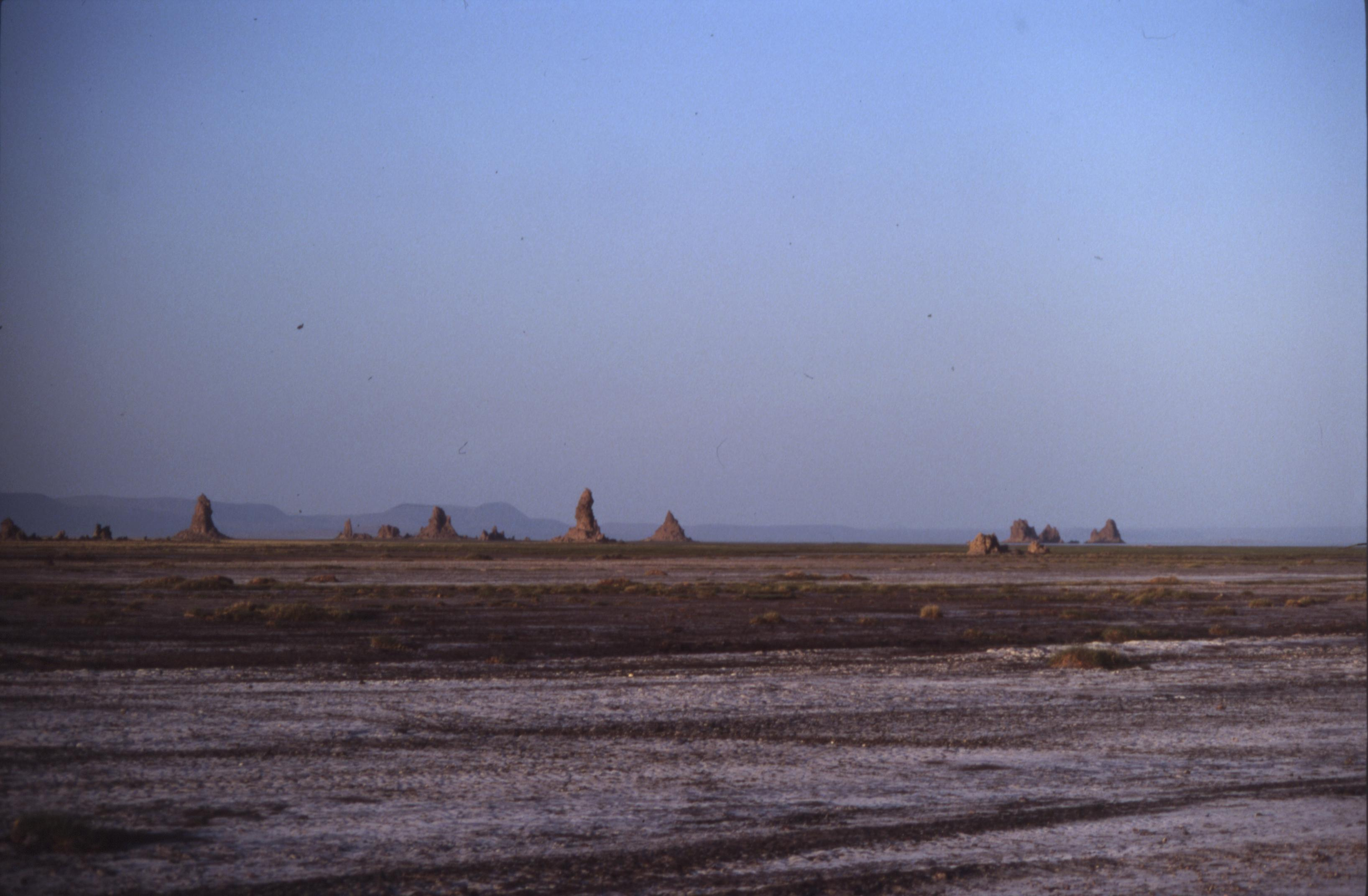
Chimneys near Lake Abbe

Lake Abbe is the ultimate destination of the waters of the Awash River. It lies at the Afar triple junction, the central meeting place for the three pieces of the Earth's crust, a defining feature of the Afar Depression. Here three pieces of Earth's crust are each pulling away from that central point, though not all at the same speed.

On the northwest shore rises Mount Dama Ali (1068 m or 3,504 ft), a dormant volcano, while along the southwestern and southern shores extend vast salt flats, 10 km in width. Besides the Awash, seasonal affluents of Lake Abbe include two wadis, the Oleldere and Abuna Merekes, which enter the lake from the west and south, crossing the salt flats. Although the present area of the lake's open water is 34,000 hectares (130 mi^{2}), recent droughts and extraction of water from the Awash River for irrigation has caused the water level of the lake to fall. By 1984, the surface area of the lake had decreased to two thirds of what it was in 1940. During this period about 11,500 hectares (28,000 acres) of saltflats had formed to the southwest of the lake. Lake Abbe is a hypersaline lake; water containing mineral salts flows in but there is no outflow, and pure water evaporates from the surface. It is also known as an "amplifier lake", the water level fluctuating dramatically in response to quite small changes in climate.

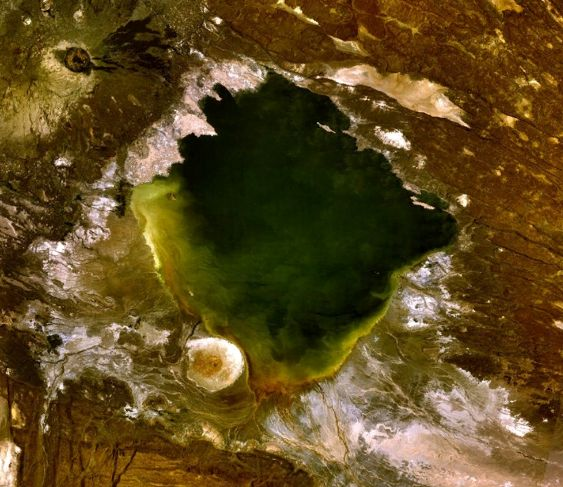
Satellite image of Lake Abbe

The Afar people have established a settlement near the lake's shore. Lake Abbe is known for its limestone chimneys, which reach heights of 50 m (160 ft) and from which steam spews forth. These carbonate chimneys are formed by the mixing of lake water and a deeper geothermal fluid. Flamingos can also be found on the waters.

=== Gallery ===
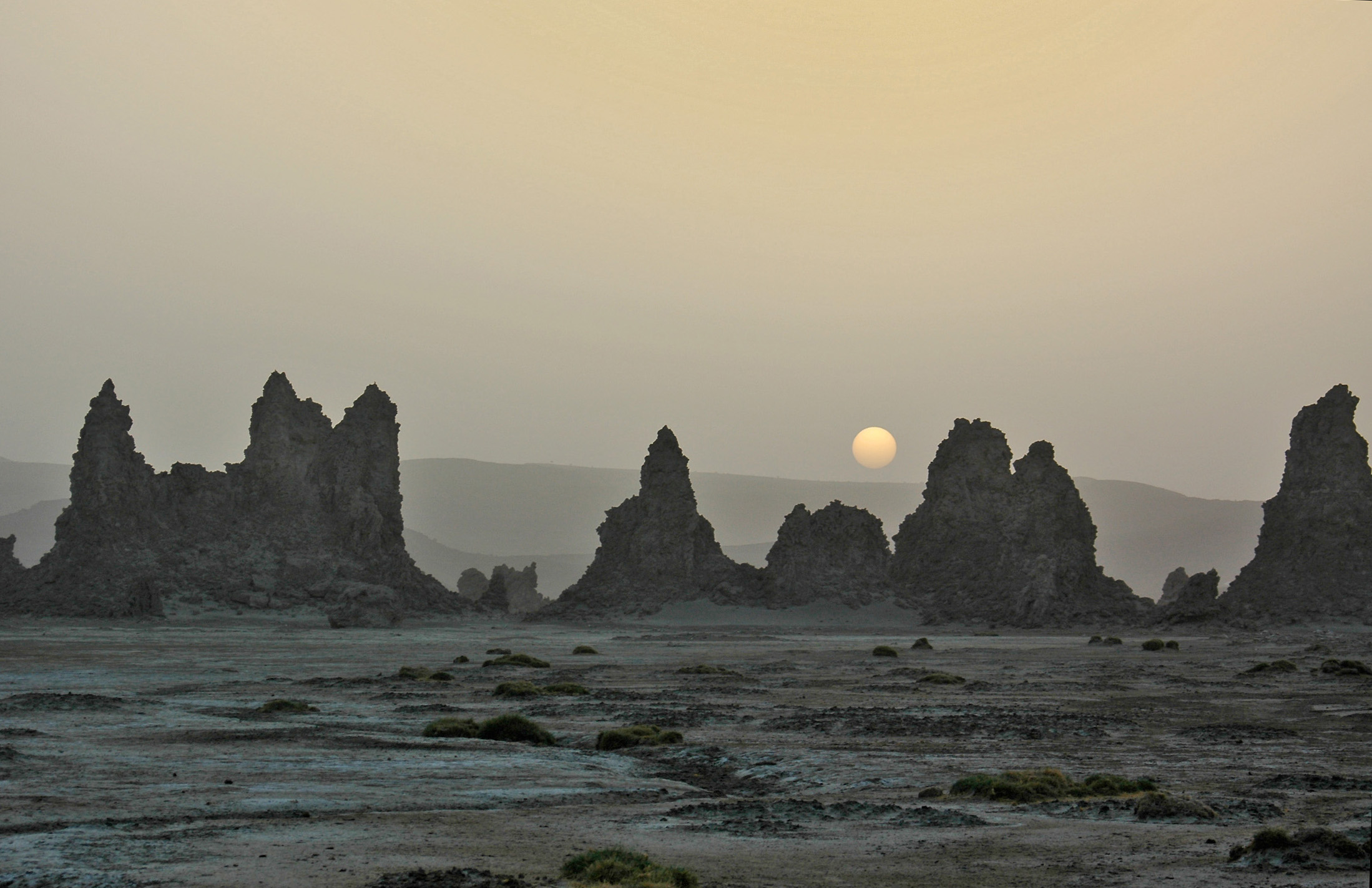
Sunset at Lake Abbe.

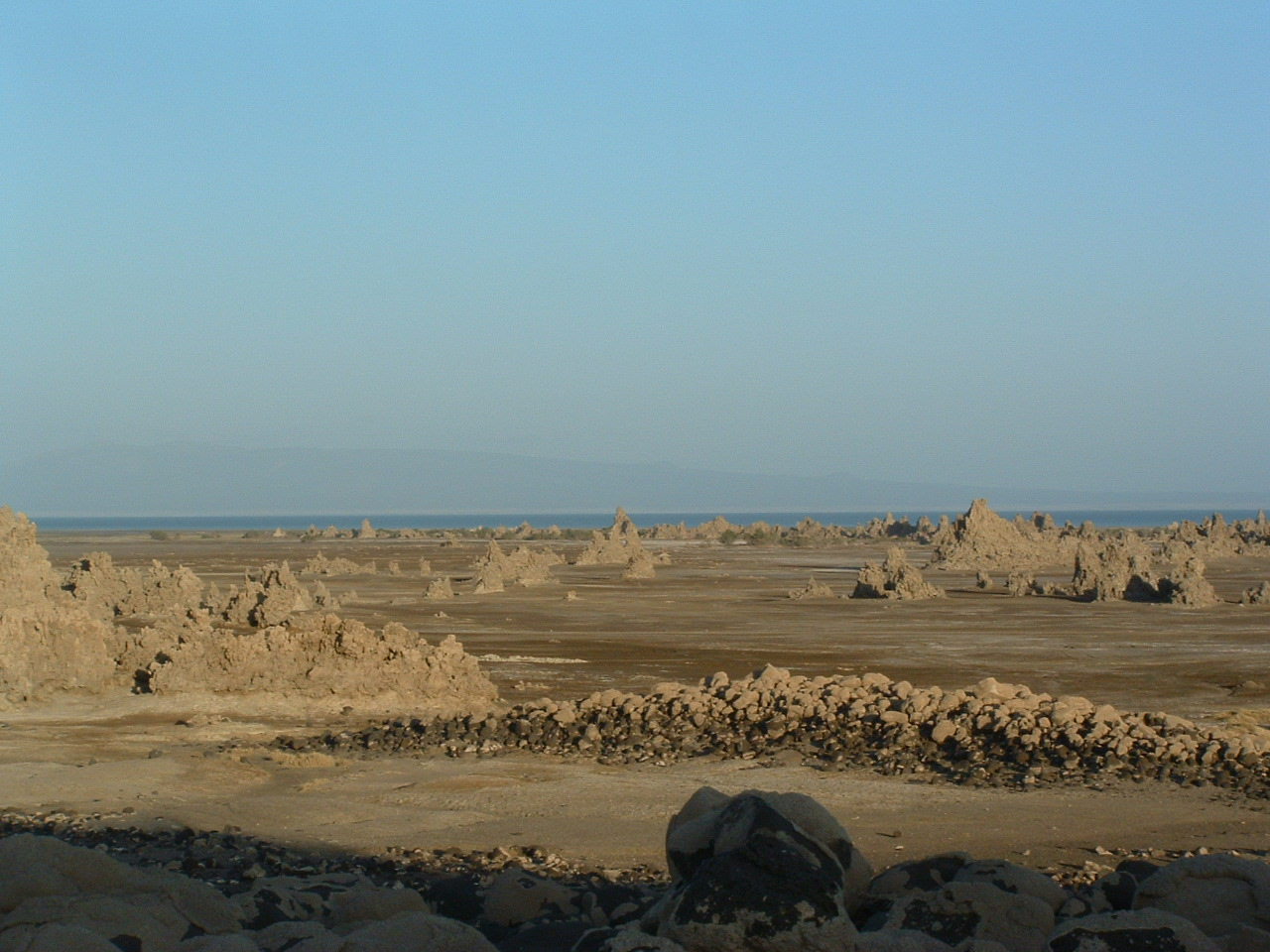
Dry part of Lake Abbe.

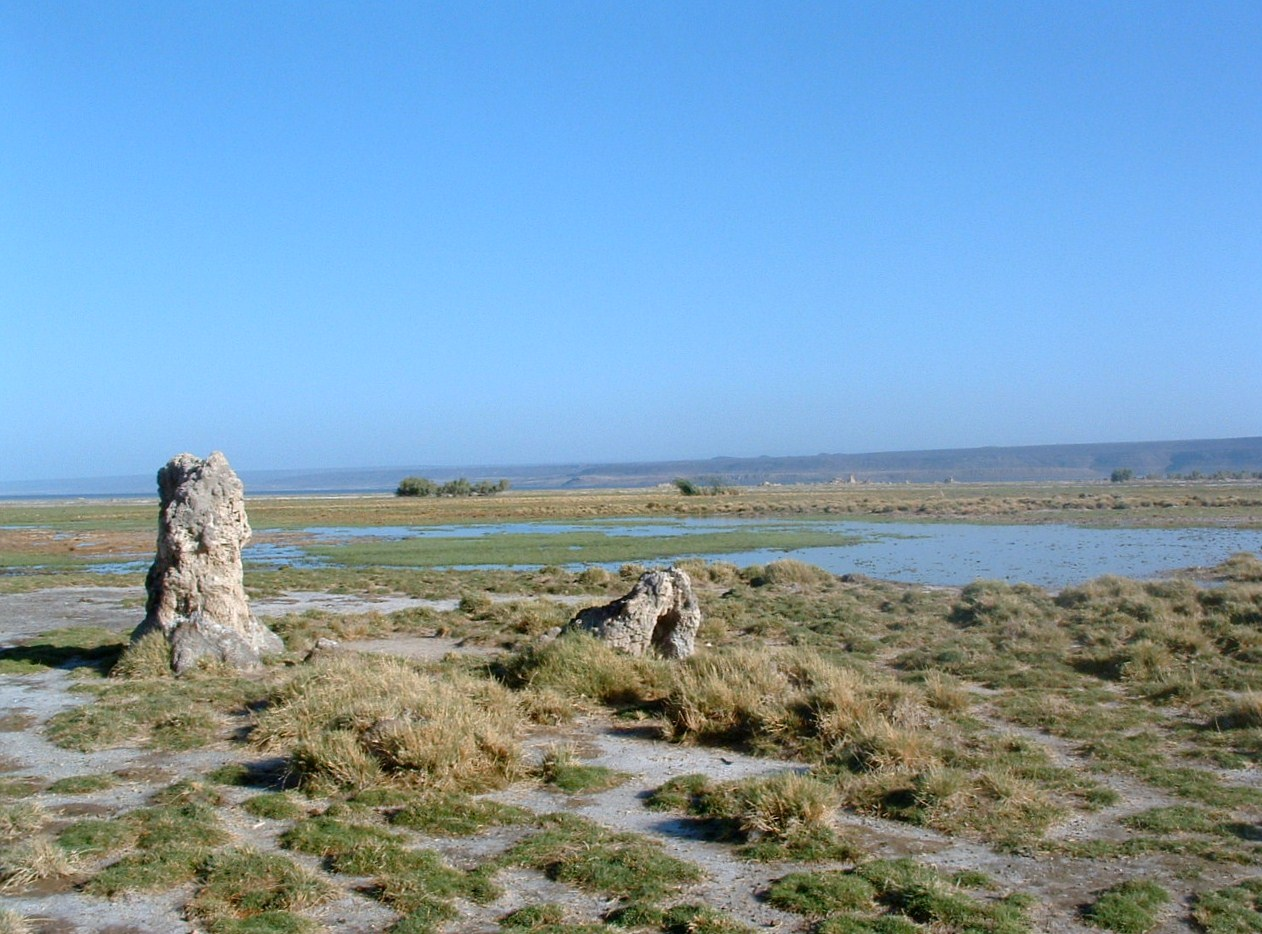
Swampy part of Lake Abbe.

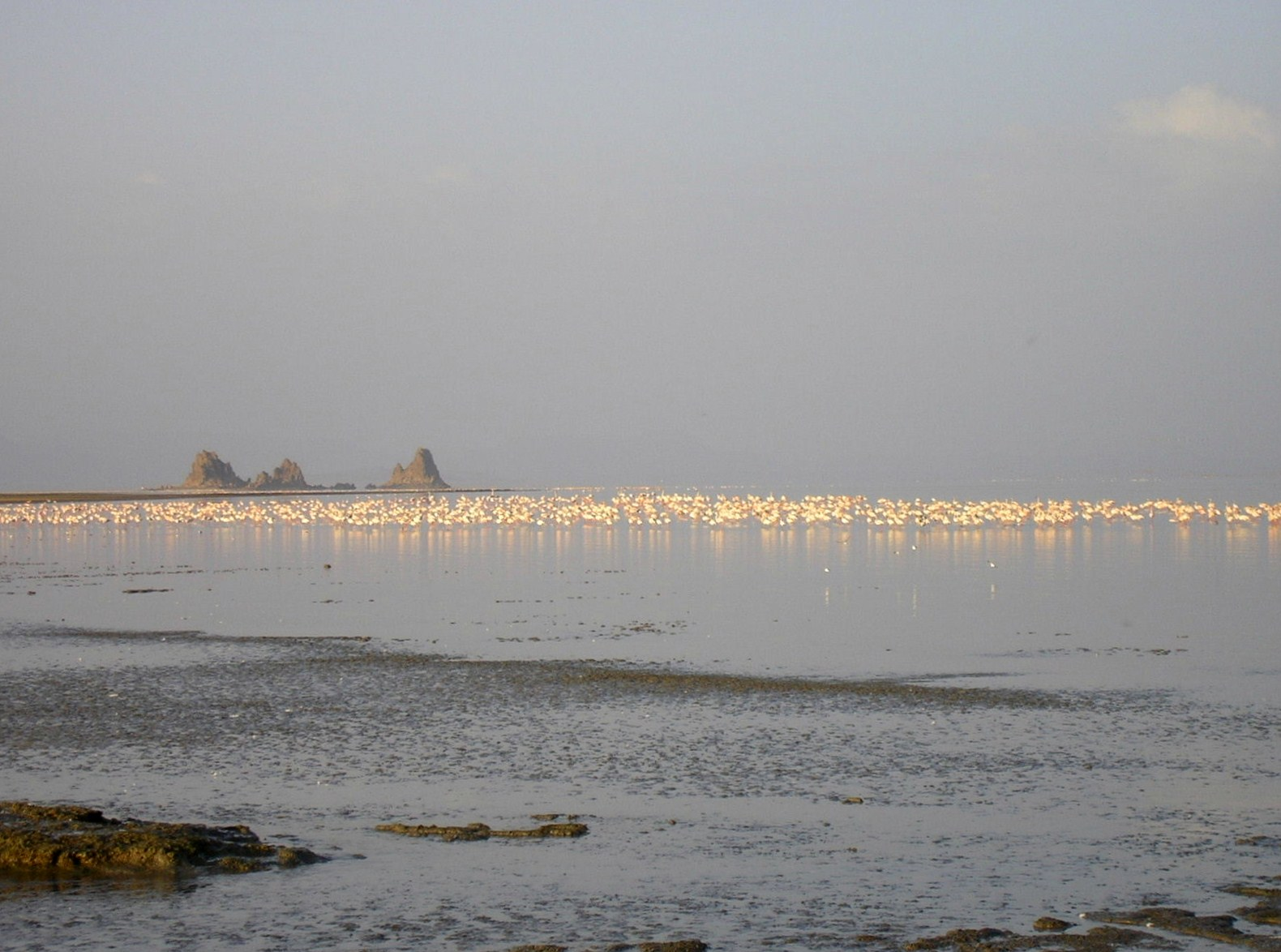
Flamingos at Lake Abbe.

== Climate ==
The Lake Abbe's climate offers year-round sunny skies and dry air. It has less than 172 millimetres (7 in) mean annual rainfall and a summer average temperature between 30 and 40 °C (86 and 104 °F). Temperatures in the coldest months range between 21 and 30 °C (70 and 86 °F) on average.

Climate data for Lake Abbe, Djibouti
Month	Jan	Feb	Mar	Apr	May	Jun	Jul	Aug	Sep	Oct	Nov	Dec	Year
Mean daily maximum °C (°F)	30.4 (86.7)	30.8 (87.4)	32.9 (91.2)	35.0 (95.0)	38.0 (100.4)	40.4 (104.7)	39.9 (103.8)	38.6 (101.5)	37.5 (99.5)	35.0 (95.0)	32.3 (90.1)	30.8 (87.4)	35.1 (95.2)
Mean daily minimum °C (°F)	20.1 (68.2)	21.8 (71.2)	23.2 (73.8)	25.0 (77.0)	27.2 (81.0)	29.3 (84.7)	27.4 (81.3)	27.0 (80.6)	28.0 (82.4)	24.3 (75.7)	21.7 (71.1)	20.4 (68.7)	24.6 (76.3)
Average precipitation mm (inches)	5 (0.2)	9 (0.4)	14 (0.6)	19 (0.7)	7 (0.3)	3 (0.1)	32 (1.3)	45 (1.8)	20 (0.8)	9 (0.4)	6 (0.2)	3 (0.1)	172 (6.9)
Source: Climate-Data.org, altitude: 251m
