= Berhale (woreda) =

District in Afar Region, Ethiopia

Coordinates: 13°50′N 40°20′E

Berahle is a woreda in Afar Region, Ethiopia. Part of the Administrative Zone 2, Berahle's territory includes part of the Afar Depression. This woreda is bordered on the south by Afdera and Abala, on the southwest by the Tigray Region, on the west by Koneba, on the north by Dallol, and on the northeast by Eritrea. Towns in Berahle include Berhale and Tiyarabora.

== Overview ==
The average elevation in this woreda is 233 meters (764 feet) above sea level. The major body of water in this woreda is the saline Lake Karum (also known as Lake Assela). As of 2008, Berhale has 236 kilometers (147 miles) of all-weather gravel road; about 13% of the total population has access to drinking water.

Education in the principal town of Berahle consists of eight grades. In 7 of the 9 rural kebeles, school consists of grades 1 through 4, while in the remaining two kebeles, the students are taught under a tree. As of 2004, a total of 2,501 children, 445 females, are enrolled in the woreda; the number of workers who have completed Grade 12 is between 1-2% and 15% are reported to be literate. Of the woreda and kebele leaders, 3% are literate.

== Demographics ==
Based on the 2007 Census conducted by the Central Statistical Agency of Ethiopia (CSA), this woreda has a total population of 78,881, of whom 45,501 are men and 33,380 women; with an area of 2,509.17 square kilometers (968.8 square miles), Berahle has a population density of 31.44 people per square kilometer (81.42 people per square mile). While 6,098 or 7.73% are urban inhabitants, a further 7,353 or 9.32% are pastoralists. A total of 11,402 households were counted in this woreda, which results in an average of 6.9 persons to a household, and 11,653 housing units. 98.93% of the population said they were Muslim, and 1.03% were Orthodox Christians.
