= Tabala (Lydia) =

Roman and Byzantine town and an ancient Bishopric in Lydia

Coordinates: 38°37′11″N 28°48′39″E

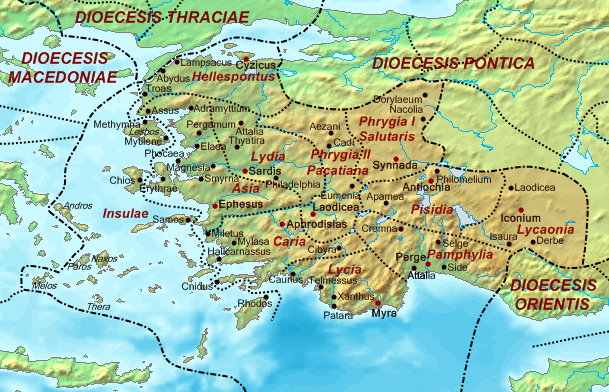
Asia Minor, 400 AD

Tabala (Ancient Greek: Τάβαλα), was a Roman and Byzantine town and a Bishopric in ancient Lydia (now Turkey). Tabala was on the Hermus River, and minted its own coins. It was probably mentioned by Hierocles under the name of Gabala, which is perhaps only miswritten for Tabala. It is even possible that it may be the town of Tabae or Tabai (Τάβαι), which Stephanus of Byzantium assigns to Lydia.

Its site is located near Burgaz in Asiatic Turkey.

== Bishopric ==
A see at Tabala was founded in the Roman era, and remains today a titular see of the Roman Catholic Church.

Known Bishops

- Polycarp (Council of Chalcedon)
- Johannes Peter Franziskus Ross (18 May 1928 Appointed - 26 Dec 1969)
