= Abala, Ethiopia =

Abala Abqaala
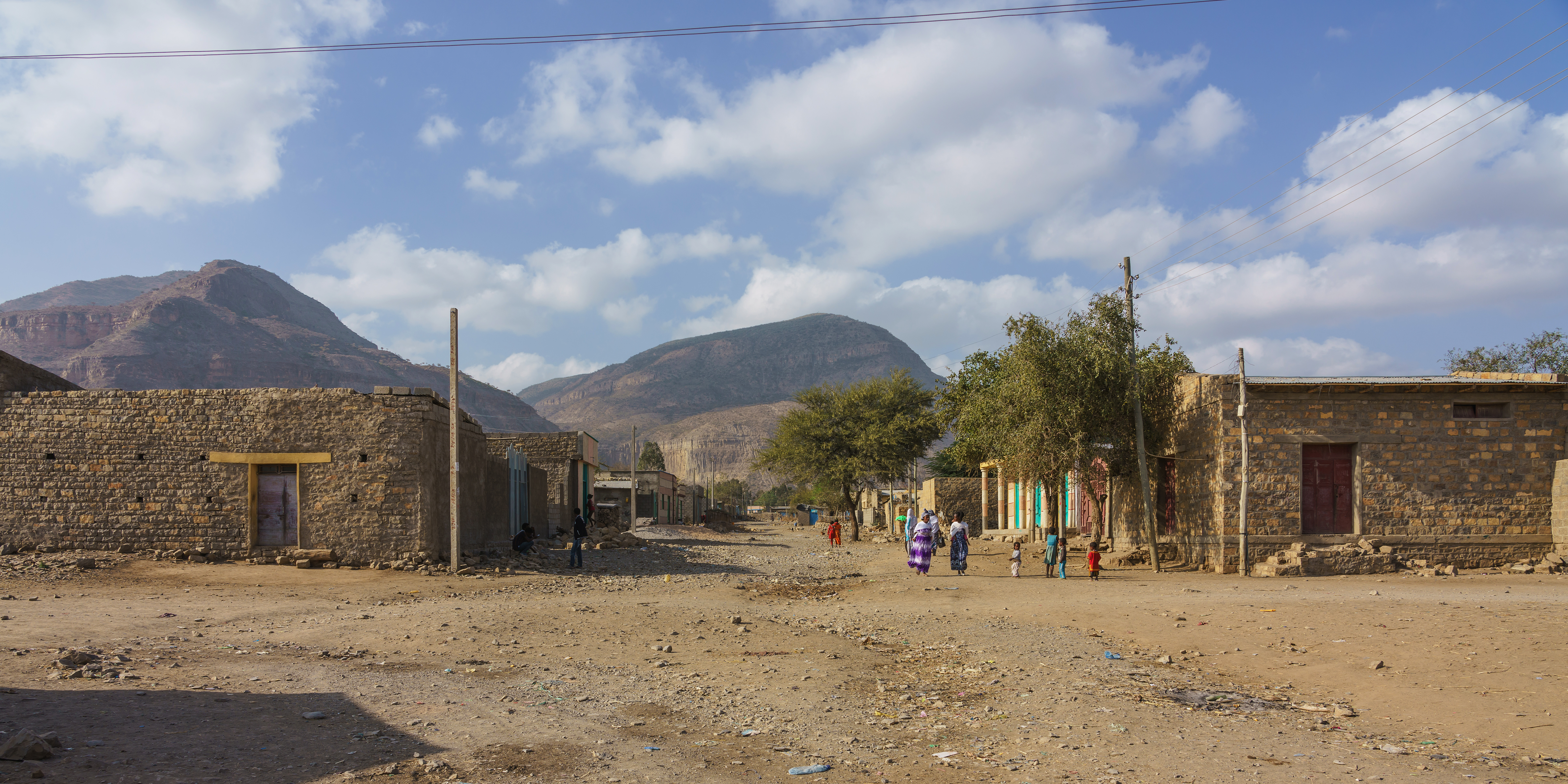

- Location in Ethiopia
- Coordinates: 13°22′N 39°45′E
- Country: Ethiopia
- Region: Afar
- Zone: Kilbet Rasu
- District: Abala
- Control: Afar National Unity Revolutionary Front
- Elevation: 1,465 m (4,806 ft)

Population (2005)
  - Total: 4,820
- Climate: BSh

Abala (Afar: Abqaala) is a town in north-eastern Abala The administrative center of Kilbet Rasu, Afar Region, this town has a latitude and longitude of 13°22′N 39°45′E with an elevation of 1465 meters .

Abala is an important trading center in the area for goats, with its market day on Thursday, and supplied by pastoralists from as far away as Afdera, Erebti and Teru woredas.

== History ==
Werner Munzinger visited Abala in June 1867 (which he calls Ala), and mentions that it was the home of Hodeli, chief of the Dumhoeta Afar, as well as the location of a weekly market on Saturday primarily in salt.

Records at the Nordic Africa Institute website mention the existence of an English mission school, and a church dedicated to Saint Michael.

In July 2010, the Ethiopian Roads Authority awarded the contract to construct a 63-kilometer gravel road from Abala to Shaigubi to Sur Construction, which is owned by the Endowment Fund for the Rehabilitation of Tigray. The contract was worth 707 million Birr. The contract for a second road 109 kilometers in length, from Shaigubi through Male to Dalol, was awarded to Defence Construction and Engineering Enterprise, a division of the Ministry of Defense, and was worth 185 million Birr. These two roads would enable Salnik Coal Mining Plc, an Indian company, to extract potash from its concession at Dallol in the Afar Depression.

=== Tigray war ===
On December 24, 2021, after a long battle between the Tigray Defense Forces and the Ethiopian military, Ethiopian armed forces entered the town and committed a massacre. Soldiers travelled from door to door as they killed anybody who was of Tigrayan ethnicity. Non-Tigrayans (mainly composed of Afar people) were left alone. Most of the survivors fled the scene or hid in Afar homes during the massacre, which lasted for five days. At least 278 people were killed in the fighting, which was reported to have been the location of mass rape and looting by Ethiopian and Afar forces. Witnesses reported that bulldozers had dumped hundreds of bodies into nearby

== Demographics ==
The Afar pastoralists in Abala practice transhumance, during drought periods, to remote areas, especially to the escarpment and highlands of the Tigray Region. Movements to the Tigray uplands allow the Afar pastoralists to herd their livestock on denser vegetation as well as on standing stubble of croplands. Currently, the Afar pastoralists in Abala have become mixed farmers, as they have also established permanent croplands. Communities have clan-based organizations. Most settlements in Abala are composed of a mixture of clans although each locality is identified with a major clan, which allows them to organize social, economic, and political support in times of crisis. The majority of the Abala communities are Afar and Muslim. However, Hidmo’s population are all Christian Tigrayans who came from the highlands in the mid-20th Century. Unlike most of the houses of the Afar, houses of this Tigraian village are built by stones and mud, the traditional building style of the nearby Enderta district in Tigray.

Based on figures from the Central Statistical Agency in 2005, Abala has an estimated total population of 4,820, of whom 2,518 are men and 2,302 are women. The 1997 census reported this town had a total population of 3,300 of whom 1,613 were men and 1,687 were women. It is the largest settlement in Abala woreda.

== Notes ==
https://commons.wikimedia.org/wiki/File:Abala_City_Administration.jpg
