= Awsi Rasu =

Zone in Afar Region of Ethiopia

Coordinates: 12°0′N 41°10′E

- Zone
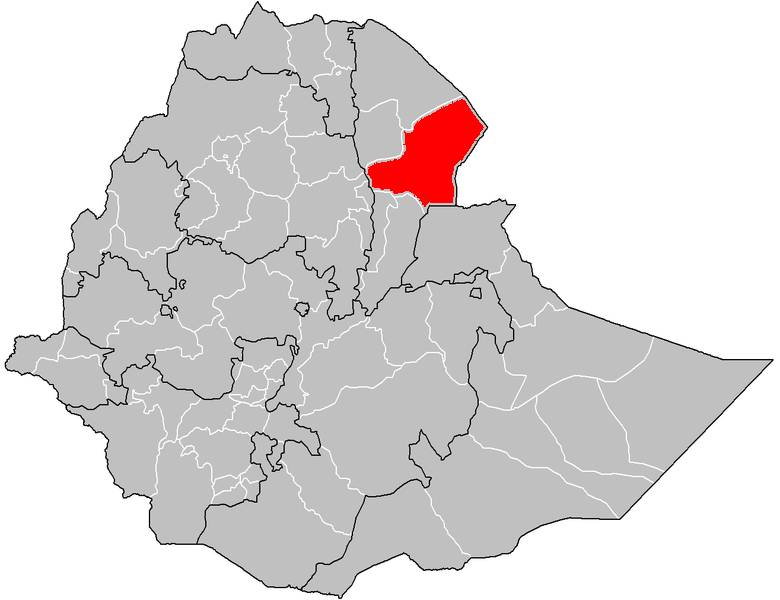
- Awsi Rasu location in Ethiopia
- Country: Ethiopia
- Region: Afar
- Capital: Asayita

Area
  - Total: 30,242.10 km^{2} (11,676.54 sq mi)

Population (2012)
  - Total: 498,873
  - Density: 16.4960/km^{2} (42.7244/sq mi)

Awsi Rasu, also known as Administrative Zone 1, is a zone in the Afar Region of Ethiopia. This zone is bordered on the south by Gabi Rasu, on the southwest by Hari Rasu, on the west by the Amhara Region, on the northwest by Fantí Rasu, on the north by Kilbet Rasu, on the northeast by Eritrea, and on the east by Djibouti.

The largest town in Awsi Rasu is Asayita. Rivers in this Zone include the Awash and its tributaries the Mille and Logiya Rivers. There are a chain of six interconnected lakes in this Zone, fed by the Awash: from north to south they are Gargori, Laitali, Gummare, Bario and Lake Abbe (or Abhe Bad).

== History ==
Following a split in the ranks of the Djiboutian political party Front for the Restoration of Unity and Democracy in 1994, 18,000 Djiboutians fled to this Zone. Most of these refugees are scattered along the main road from Ayasita to Bure, either integrated into local settlements, or - in the case of nomads - allowed to graze their animals in the areas of their host clans.

In August 1999, a planned release of waters from the Koka Reservoir resulted in flooding by the Awash—although an investigation afterwards showed the flooding was caused by dike failures and silting of the Awash. Approximately 4,000 hectares of cropland in the Zone and 3 rural kebeles in Asayita, 5 in Afambo and 8 in Dubti woredas were affected.

== Demographics ==
Based on the 2007 Census conducted by the Central Statistical Agency of Ethiopia (CSA), this Zone has a total population of 410,790, of whom 224,656 are men and 186,134 women; with an area of 30,242.10 square kilometers, it has a population density of 13.58. While 82,886 or 20.18% are urban inhabitants, a further 178,557 or 43.47% were pastoralists. A total of 75,735 households were counted in this Zone, which results in an average of 5.4 persons to a household, and 78,104 housing units. Two largest ethnic groups reported in Awsi Rasu were the Afar (88.52%) and Amhara (9.97%); all other ethnic groups made up 1.51% of the population. Afar is spoken as a first language by 88.43%, and Amharic by 10.4%; the remaining 1.17% spoke all other primary languages reported. 96.55% of the population said they were Muslim, and 3.29% were Orthodox Christians.

The 1996 national census reported a total population for this Zone of 327,901, of whom 186,616 were men and 141,285 women; 42,213 or 12.9% of its population were urban dwellers at the time. The major ethnic groupings in 1996 were 88.09% Afar, 9.98% Amhara, 0.75% Tigrean, and 0.71% Oromo. Of the school-age school-age children, 4.86% (5.05% male and 4.60% female) were currently attending school, which is higher than the Regional average; 11.28% of the total population over the age of 10 (12.93% male and 9.14% female) are reported to be literate.

== Agriculture ==
Based on a sample enumeration of private land held in this Zone performed by the CSA in 2001, 43.1% is under cultivation, 2.82% pasture, 35.9% is fallow, and the remaining 5.15% is devoted to other uses. For the land under cultivation in this woreda, 53.32% in planted in cereals like maize and sorghum; data is missing for the land planted in pulses and vegetables, but 3.54 hectares was planted in fruit trees, 0.9 hectares in bananas and 0.91 in guavas. 5.53% of the farmers both raise crops and livestock, while 17.35% only grow crops and 77.12% only raise livestock. Land tenure in this Zone is distributed between 76.63% own their land, 7.65% rent, and the remaining 15.72% are held under other forms of tenure.
