= Bure (disputed zone) =

Place in Afar Region of Ethiopia and Eritrea border

Bure ቡሬ
- Location within Ethiopia
- Coordinates: 12°37′N 42°12′E
- Country: Ethiopia
- Region: Afar

Bure (Amharic: ቡሬ) is a small area about 80 kilometres (50 mi) west of Asseb, on the border between Eritrea and Ethiopia, and claimed by both countries. Bure lies across the important Awash-Asseb highway, which in the past has been an important trucking route.

Bure ቡሬ came under Eritrean control after several weeks of fighting in May–June 1998. Eritrea said that Ethiopia had started an offensive at Bure by dropping bombs on the front-lines on 14 February 1999. The fighting in the area continued through the Eritrean-Ethiopian War (1998-2000), with each side claiming it had inflicted heavy casualties on the other, until they agreed to a ceasefire.

The Eritrea-Ethiopia Boundary Commission determined in 2002 that Bure lay on the Ethiopian side of the border. Relations between Eritrea and Ethiopia soured in November 2005, when 20 Ethiopian soldiers occupied a portion of the area for several days. After peace-keeping troops from United Nations Mission in Ethiopia and Eritrea intervened, Ethiopian troops were withdrawn.

The BBC published on 19 June 2008 a timeline of Eritrea's conflict with Ethiopia to that date and reported that the "Border dispute rumbles on":

- 2007 September – War could resume between Ethiopia and Eritrea over their border conflict, warns United Nations special envoy to the Horn of Africa, Kjell Magne Bondevik.
- 2007 November – Eritrea accepts border line demarcated by international boundary commission. Ethiopia rejects it.
- 2008 January – UN extends mandate of peacekeepers on Ethiopia-Eritrea border for six months. UN Security Council demands Eritrea lift fuel restrictions imposed on UN peacekeepers at the Eritrea-Ethiopia border area. Eritrea declines, saying troops must leave border.
- 2008 February – UN begins pulling 1,700-strong peacekeeper force out due to lack of fuel supplies following Eritrean government restrictions.
- 2008 April – UN Secretary-General Ban Ki-moon warns of likelihood of new war between Ethiopia and Eritrea if peacekeeping mission withdraws completely. Outlines options for the future of the UN mission in the two countries.
- 2008 May – Eritrea calls on UN to terminate peacekeeping mission.

== See also ==
- Badme
- Zalambessa
