= Mount Dama Ali =

Shield volcano in Ethiopia

Dama Ali
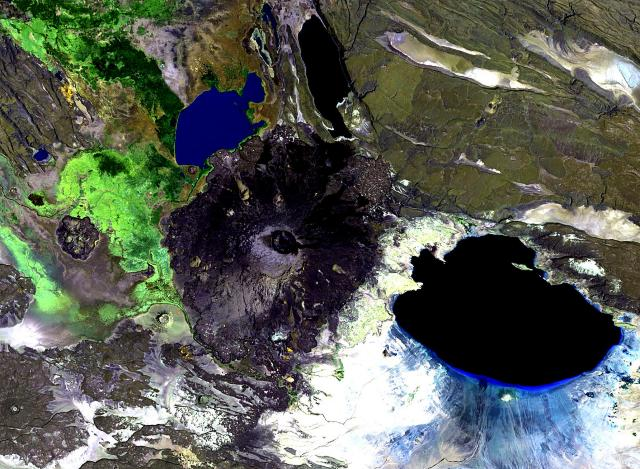

Highest point
- Elevation: 1,068 m (3,504 ft)
- Listing: Volcanoes of Ethiopia
- Coordinates: 11°17′0″N 41°38′0″E

Geography
- Location within Ethiopia
- Country: Ethiopia

Geology
- Mountain type: Shield volcano
- Rock types: Basalt, Trachyte, Trachydacite and Rhyolite
- Last eruption: February 1631

Mount Dama Ali is a 25 km (16 mi) wide shield volcano in Ethiopia, on the shore of Lake Abbe.
