= Lake Afambo =

Lake in Ethiopia

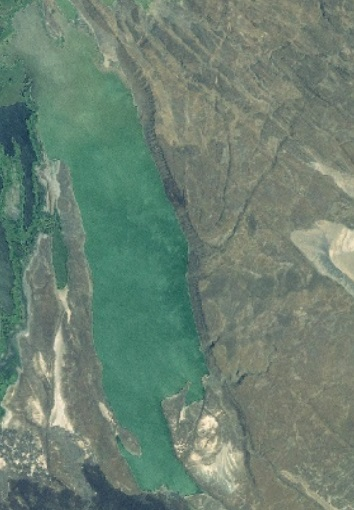

- Location within Ethiopia
- Location: eastern end of the Afar Region
- Coordinates: 11°25′19″N 41°40′21″E
- Primary inflows: Awash River
- Basin countries: Ethiopia
- Max. length: 13 km (8.1 mi)
- Max. width: 2 km (1.2 mi)
- Surface area: 1,760 ha (4,300 acres)

Lake Afambo is one of a chain of lakes into which the Awash River empties its waters. It is located at the eastern end of the Afar Region of Ethiopia.

== Overview ==
The lake lies on a roughly north–south axis, 13 kilometers long by two wide, having 1760 hectares of open water. Afambo receives its inflow from Lake Gummare from a channel at its northern point, and has its outflow in the swamps on its southwest shores where it empties into Lake Bario.

The first European to visit Lake Afambo was Wilfred Thesiger, who explored the course of the Awash to its ultimate ending point in 1935. Thesiger led his party along the eastern and southern sides of this lake. This area did not see another visitor from outside Ethiopia until Pele Thompson retraced Thesiger's steps in May and June 2001. There had been a bridge over the channel linking lakes Gummare and Afambo at Ebobe, but it had "collapsed some time ago." Further, while Lake Afambo had been a fresh water lake when Thesiger visited in, it has since become very saline due to the amount of water diverted upstream for irrigation purposes.
