= Lake Gummare =

Lake in Ethiopia

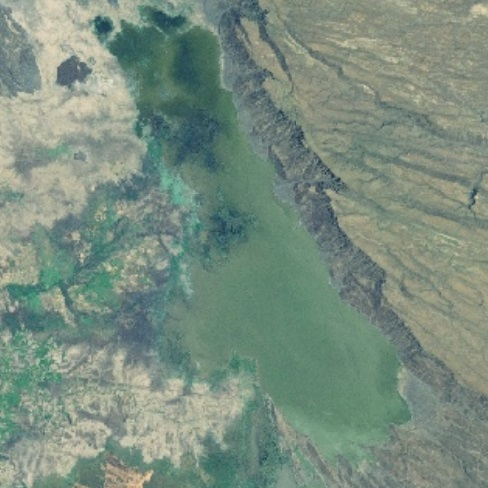

- Location within Ethiopia
- Location: eastern end of the Afar Region
- Coordinates: 11°32′N 41°40′E
- Primary inflows: Awash River
- Basin countries: Ethiopia
- Max. length: 15 km (9.3 mi)
- Max. width: 5 km (3.1 mi)
- Surface area: c. 6,000 ha (15,000 acres)

Lake Gummare is one of a chain of lakes into which the Awash River empties its waters. It is located at the eastern end of the Afar Region of Ethiopia.

== Overview ==
The lake lies on a roughly north–south axis, 15 kilometers long by five wide, having about 6,000 hectares of open water. Gummare receives its inflow from the Awash on its northwestern shore, and its outflow is on its southern shores where a channel joins the lake with Lake Afambo.

The first European to visit Lake Gummare was Wilfred Thesiger, who explored the course of the Awash to its ultimate ending point in 1935. Thieseger, who called this body of water Lake Adobada "The White Water"), explored its shores, but due to the opposition of the local Afar, he was forced to lead the main body of his party not along its western side, where the main road ran, but "round the almost pathless eastern shore". This area did not see another visitor from outside Ethiopia until Pele Thompson retraced Thesiger's steps in May and June 2001.
