= Fantí Rasu =

Zone in Afar Region of Ethiopia

Coordinates: 12°20′N 40°10′E

- Zone
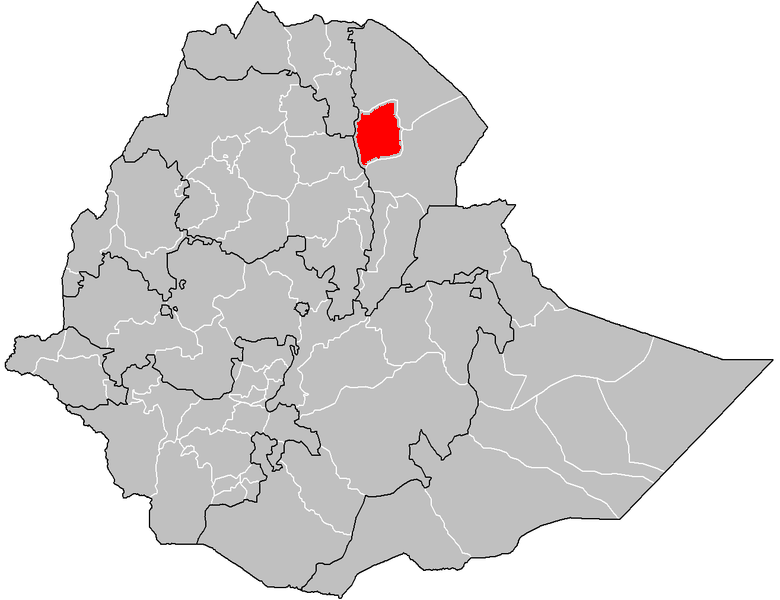
- Fantí Rasu location in Ethiopia
- Country: Ethiopia
- Region: Afar
- Capital: Kelewina

Area
  - Total: 11,202.75 km^{2} (4,325.41 sq mi)

Population (2007)
  - Total: 273,180
  - Density: 24/km^{2} (63/sq mi)

Fantí Rasu, also known as Administrative Zone 4, is a zone in Afar Region of Ethiopia. This zone is bordered on the south and east by Awsi Rasu, on the southwest by the Amhara Region, on the northwest by the Tigray Region, and on the north by Kilbet Rasu. The administrative center of the Zone is Kaluwan (also named Gulina); the largest town is Dibina.

== Demographics ==
Based on the 2007 Census conducted by the Central Statistical Agency of Ethiopia (CSA), this Zone has a total population of 246,822, of whom 140,741 are men and 106,081 women. While 9,441 or 3.83% are urban inhabitants, a further 118,691 or 48.09% were pastoralists. Two largest ethnic groups reported in Fantí Rasu were the Afar (98.67%), and Amhara (1.09%); all other ethnic groups made up 0.24% of the population. Afar is spoken as a first language by 98.64%, Amharic by 1.15%; the remaining 0.21% spoke all other primary languages reported. 99.62% of the population said they were Muslim.

The 1996 national census reported a total population for this Zone of 126,455, of whom 70,747 were men and 55,708 women; 1,747 or 1.4% of its population were urban dwellers at the time. The major ethnic groupings in 1996 were 99.55% Afar, and 0.34% Amhara. Of the school-age school-age children, 1.06% (1.49% male and 0.51% female) were currently attending school, which is lower than the Regional average; 2.20% of the total population over the age of 10 (3.48% male and 0.55% female) are reported to be literate.
