= Kilbet Rasu =

Coordinates: 13°30′N 40°30′E

Kilbatti Rasu (Northern zone) Kilbatti Rasu
- Zone
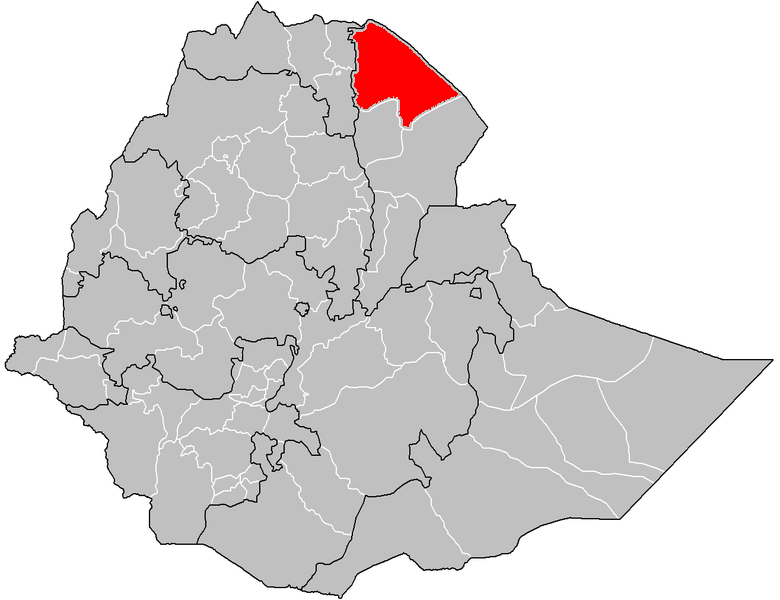
- Zone 2 location in Ethiopia
- Country: Ethiopia
- Region: Afar
- Capital: Abala

Government
  - Zone Administrator: Mohammed Idris Undullu

Area
  - Total: 18,068.34 km^{2} (6,976.23 sq mi)

Population (2012)
  - Total: 391,467
  - Density: 21.6659/km^{2} (56.1144/sq mi)

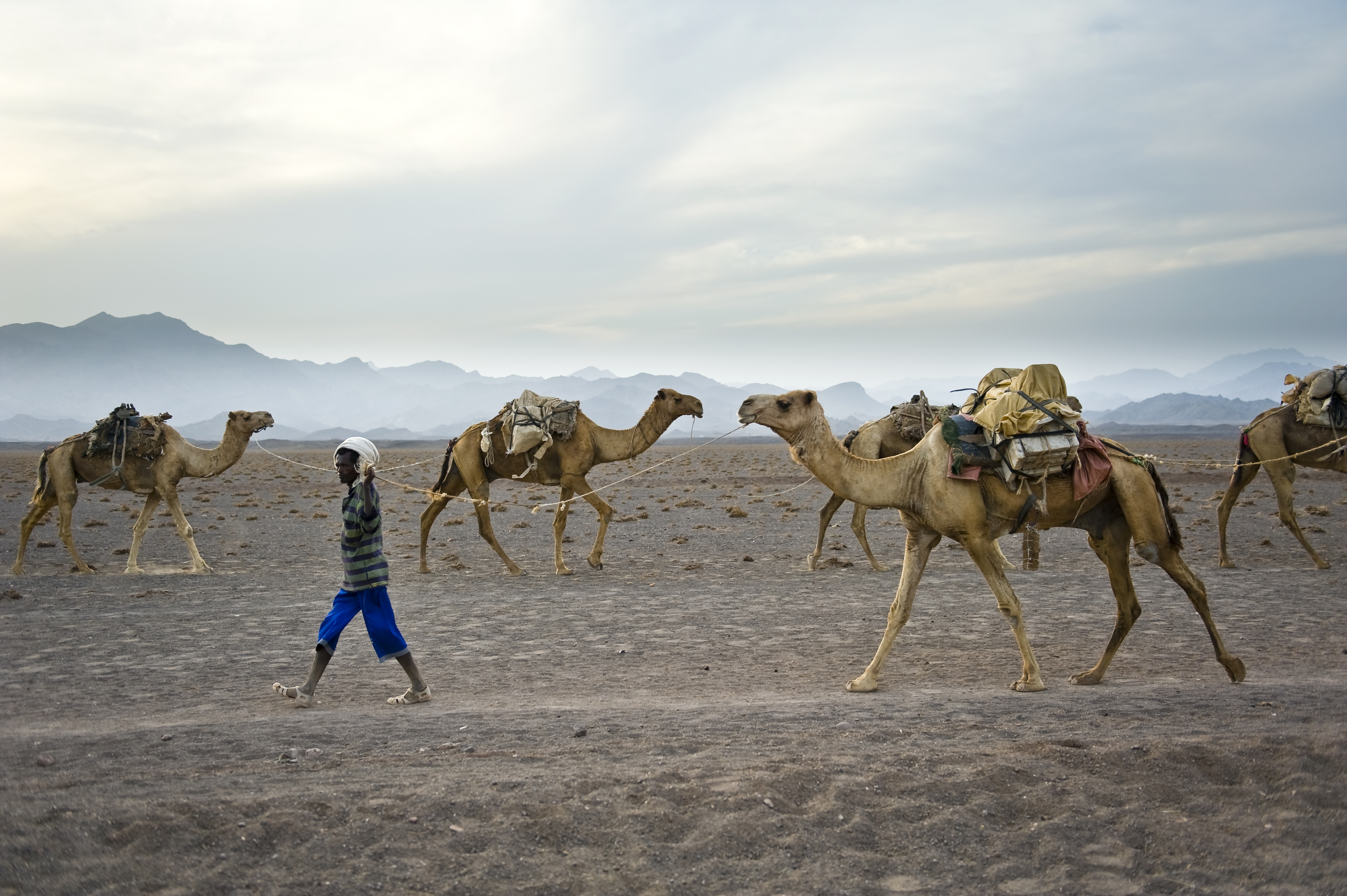
Afar people carrying salt from Danakil Depression

Kilbatti (Kilbat) Rasu, also known as Administrative Zone 2, is one of the five zones in the Afar Region of Ethiopia. This zone is bordered on the south by Awsi Rasu, on the southwest by Fantí Rasu, on the west by the Tigray Region, and on the north by Eritrea. The administrative center of Kilbet Rasu is Abala (also known in the highlands as Shiket). Also located in this zone is the former mining settlement of Dallol, which set the record for the hottest inhabited place on Earth, with an average temperature of 34 °C.

== History ==
Prior to the adoption of the 1995 constitution, a portion of this Zone (particularly the northern part) was part of Tigray Province. As a result, a UNDP mission visiting the Zone described it as "the most isolated zone of the Afar National Regional State", at the time showing signs of "suffered heavily from bombardment (from the Ethiopian Civil War), as well as from general neglect. Much of the remaining infrastructure dates from the Haile Selassie era."

At the time the UNDP visited, they observed two major socio-political issues in the Zone. The first was a smoldering conflict between the Afar Revolutionary Democratic Unity Front (ARDUF) and government forces. The ARDUF conducted sporadic attacks on government military forces and officials and competed for control of the salt trade. In response, the military closed markets at Berhale, Garamoyti, Gaharta, ‘Ala, Mergis and Dande, and schools in at least three woredas. The second was the continued influx of rural Afar, primarily nomads, from Eritrea. These new arrivals claimed to be fleeing the Eritrean government's recent enforcement of its National Service programme and a parallel agenda of disarmament. Despite a lack of external assistance, these refugees were given assistance and shelter due to clan ties between them and the locals.

== Demographics ==
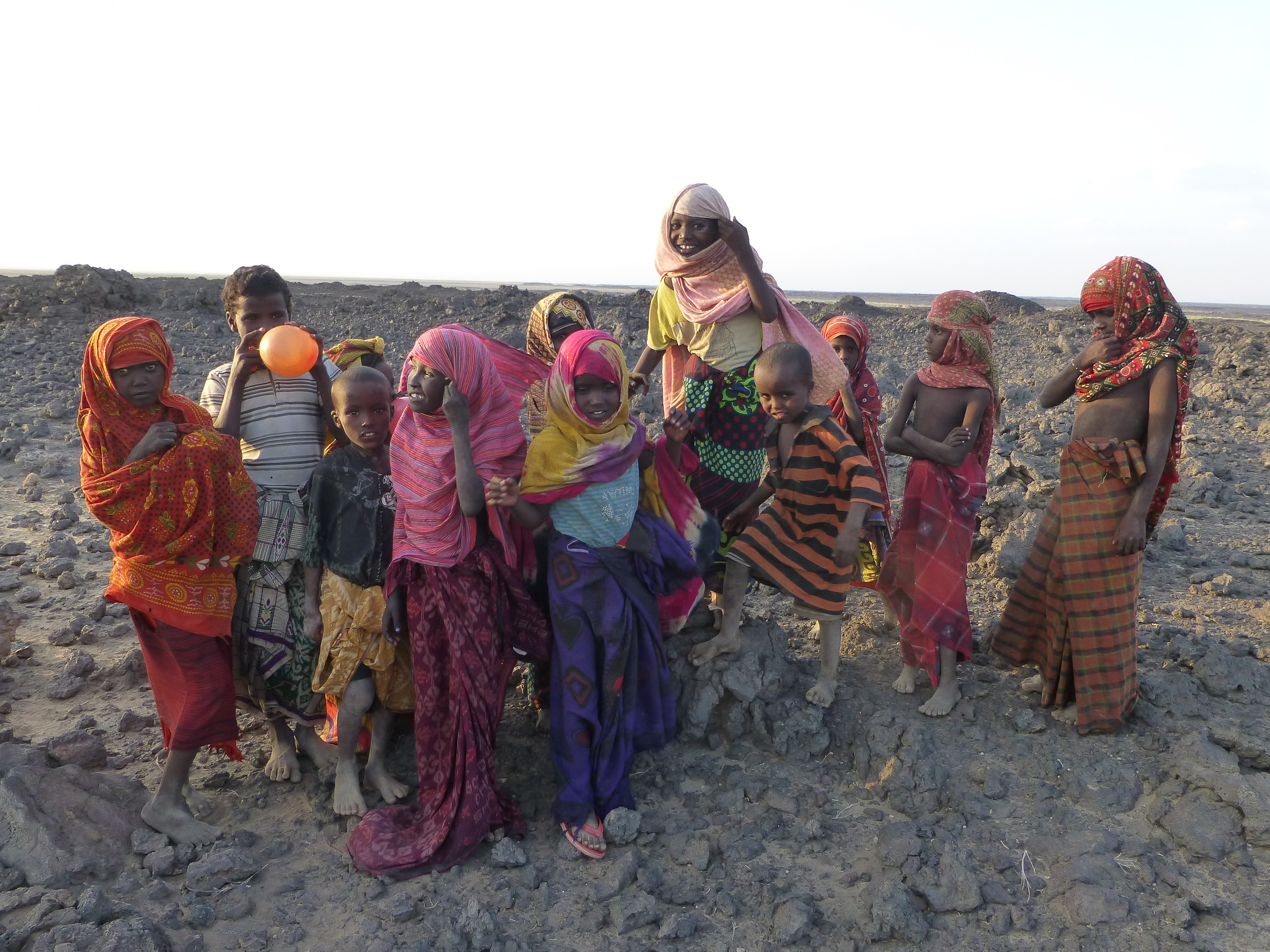
The Odali \ Afar people live in Afar Region.

Based on the 2007 Census conducted by the Central Statistical Agency of Ethiopia (CSA), this Zone has a total population of 350,111, of whom 195,404 are men and 154,707 women. While 26,217 or 7.49% are urban inhabitants, a further 38,249 or 10.93% were pastoralists. Two largest ethnic groups reported in Kilbet Rasu were the Afar (96.04%) and Tigrayans (3.29%); all other ethnic groups made up 0.67% of the population. Afar is spoken as a first language by 96%, and Tigrinya by 3.31%; the remaining 0.69% spoke all other primary languages reported. 96.54% of the population said they were Muslim, and 3.4% were Orthodox Christians.

The 1996 national census reported a total population for this Zone of 218,721, of whom 121,598 were men and 97,123 women; 4,990 or 2.3% of its population were urban dwellers at the time. The major ethnic groupings in 1996 were 97.73% Afar and 2.16% Tigrean. Of the school-age school-age children, 2.31 (3.25% male and 1.10% female) were currently attending school, which is lower than the Regional average; 4.16% of the total population over the age of 10 (6.26% male and 1.5% female) are reported to be literate.
