= Afar Region =

Regional state in northeastern Ethiopia

Coordinates: 11°49′N 41°25′E

Afar Region ዓፋር ክልል Qafar Rakaakaya
- Regional state
- Flag Seal

- Map of Ethiopia showing Afar Region
- Country: Ethiopia
- Established: 1992
- Capital: Semera

Government
  - Chief Administrator: Awol Arba

Area
  - Total: 72,053 km^{2} (27,820 sq mi)
  - Rank: 4th

Population (2025)
  - Total: 2,525,000
  - Rank: 8th
  - Density: 35.04/km^{2} (90.76/sq mi)
- Demonym: Afars
- ISO 3166 code: ET-AF
- HDI (2021): 0.440 low · 11th of 11

The Afar Region (/ˈɑːfɑːr/; Afar: Qafar Rakaakayak; Amharic: ዓፋር ክልል), formerly known as Region 2, is a regional state in northeastern Ethiopia and the homeland of the Afar people. Its capital is the planned city of Semera, which lies on the paved Awash–Assab highway. It is bordered by Eritrea to the north and Djibouti to the northeast; it also shares regional borders with the Tigray, Amhara, Oromo and Somali regions.

The Afar Triangle, the northern part of which is the Danakil Depression, is part of the Great Rift Valley of Ethiopia, and is located in the north of the region. It has the lowest point in Ethiopia and one of the lowest in Africa. The southern part of the region consists of the valley of the Awash River, which empties into a string of lakes along the Djibouti–Ethiopia border. Other notable landmarks include the Awash National Park.

Afar Region is a developing region of Ethiopia with a high rate of fertility.

== Demographics ==
Based on the 2024 projections by the Central Statistical Agency of Ethiopia (CSA), the Afar Regional State has a population of 2,120,000, consisting of 1,149,000 men and 971,000 women; urban inhabitants number 504,000 of the population, a further 1,616,000 were pastoralists.

Based on the 2007 Census conducted by the Central Statistical Agency of Ethiopia (CSA), the Afar Regional State has a population of 1,290,273, consisting of 575117 men and 715,156 women; urban inhabitants number 249,535 or 13.32% of the population, a further 556,123 or 29.43% were pastoralists. With an estimated area of 96,707 square kilometers, this region has an estimated density of 14.38 people per square kilometer. For the entire region 297,255 households were counted, which results in an average for the Region of 5.6 persons to a household, with urban households having on average 4 and rural households 6 people.

Ethnicity of Afar region
Ethnic Group	2007 Census	1994 Census
Afar	90.03%	91.8%
Somali	5.22%	4.5%
Argobba	1.55%	0.9%
Tigrayan	1.15%	0.8%
Amhara	0.61%	0.8%
Welayta	0.59%	0.5%
Hadiya	0.18%	0.2%

Religion of Afar region
Religion	2007 Census	1994 Census
Muslim	96%	95.6%
Christian	4.7%	4.4%
Orthodox	3.86%	3.9%
P'ent'ay	0%	0%
Catholics	0.09%	0.1%

Religion in Afar Region (2007)
1. Muslim (95.2%)
2. Ethiopian Orthodox (3.90%)
3. P'ent'ay (0.60%)
4. Traditional faiths (0.10%)
5. Catholic (0.10%)
6. Other (0.10%)

In the previous census, conducted in 1994, the region's population was reported to be 1,106,383 of which 626,839 were men and 479,544 women; urban inhabitants were 85,879 or 7.76% of the population.

Afar is predominantly (89.96%) spoken in the region and is the working language of the state. Other languages with a significant number of speakers in the state include Amharic (6.83%), Tigrayans (1.06%), Argobba (0.79%), Wolaitta (0.43%), and Oromifa (0.4%).

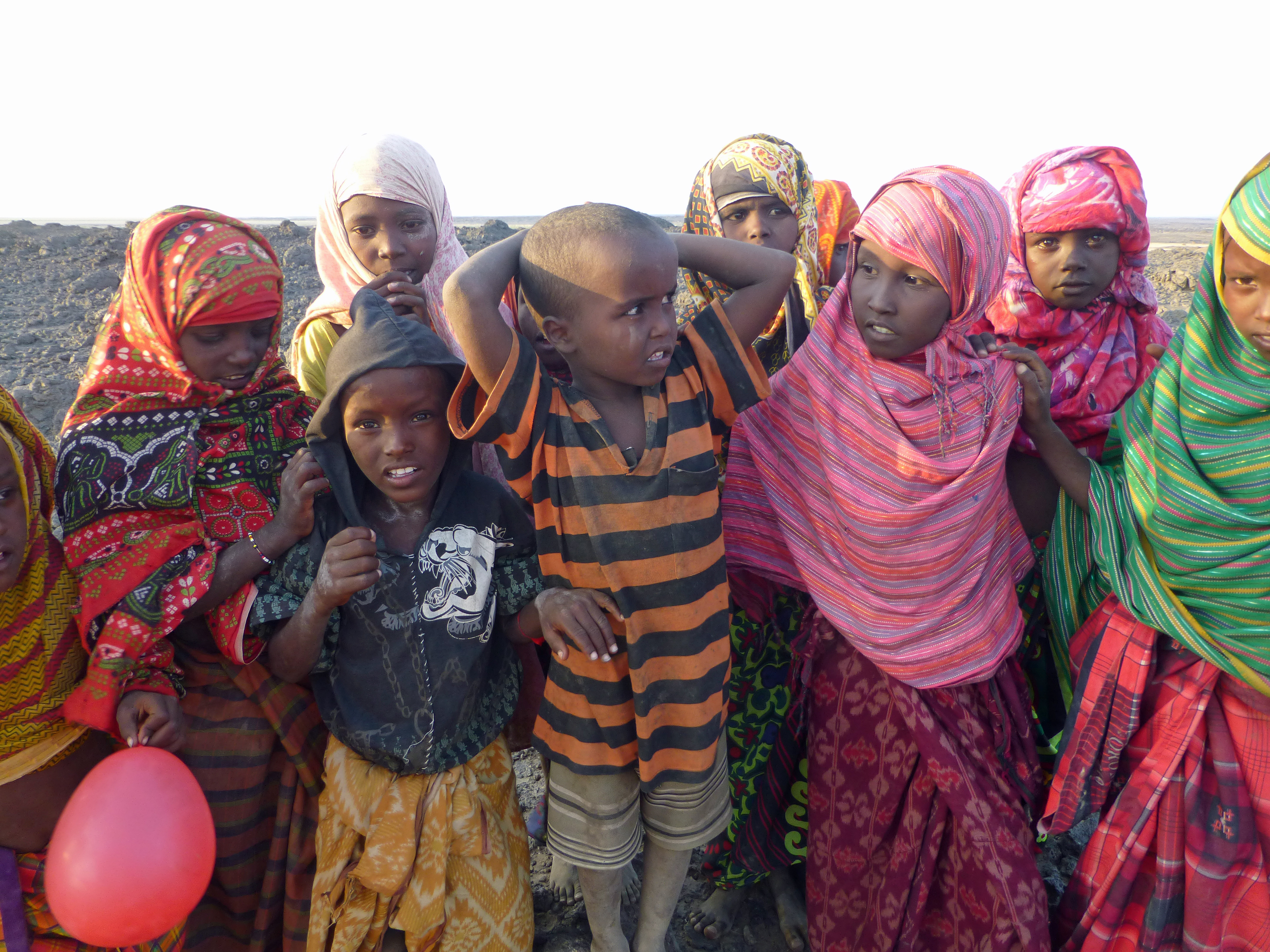
The Afar, or Odali, are the most populous culture in Afar Region.

According to the CSA, as of 2004, 48.57% of the total population had access to safe drinking water, of whom 26.89% were rural inhabitants and 78.11% were urban. Values for other reported common indicators of the standard of living for the Afar Regional State as of 2005 include the following: 67.3% of the inhabitants fall into the lowest wealth quintile; adult literacy for men is 27% and for women 15.6%; and the regional infant mortality rate is 61 infant deaths per 1,000 live births, which is less than the nationwide average of 77; at least half of these deaths occurred in the infants' first month of life. On 20 April 2007, the regional government announced that it had increased health coverage from 34% to 40%, the result of construction of 64 new health clinics, increasing the total for the region to 111.

== Land features ==
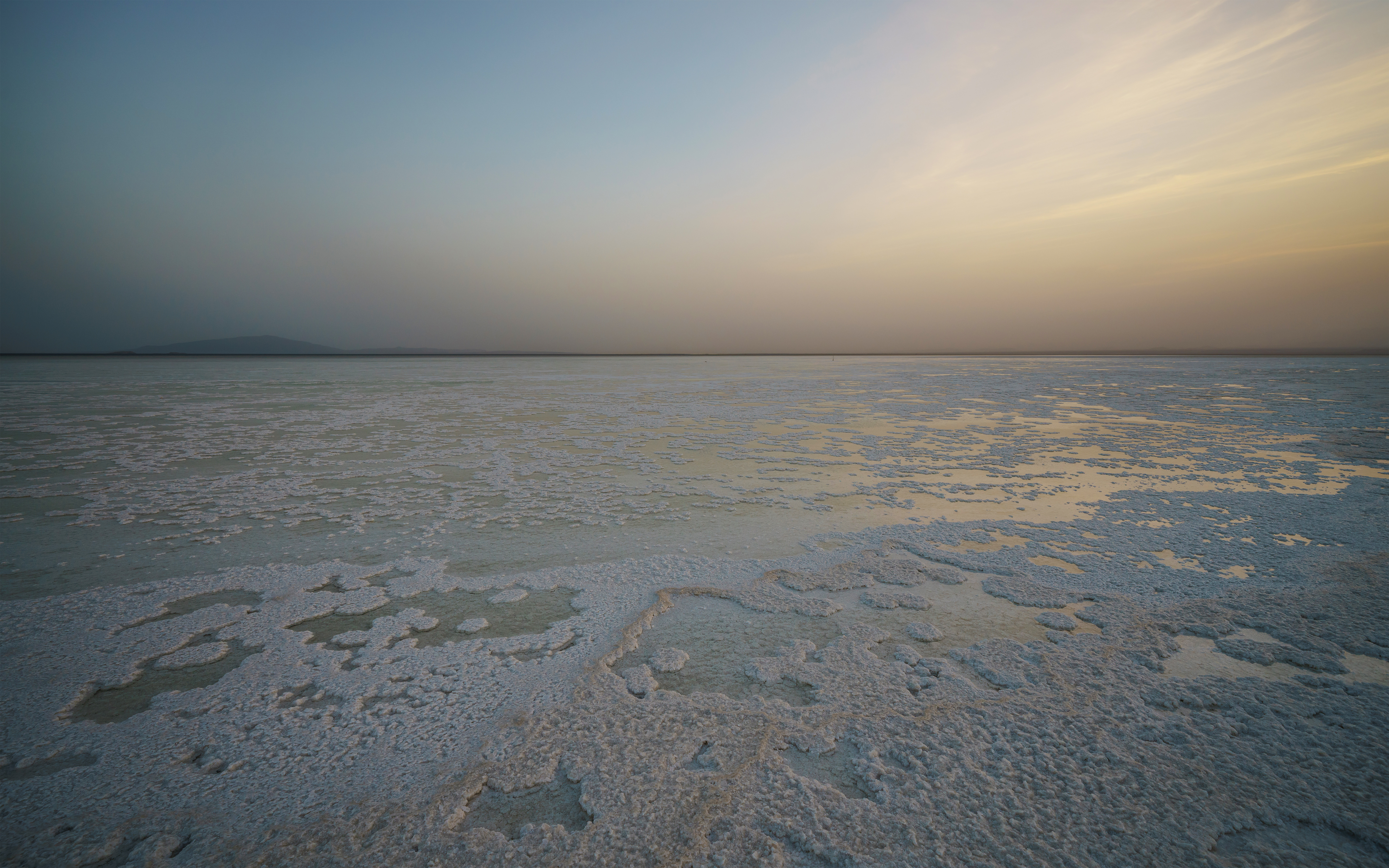
Lake Karum is very saline and is in the Afar Region of Ethiopia.

Afar Depression, Erta Ale active volcano, Awash National Park, Yangudi Rassa National Park, Hadar and Aramis areas, are the major tourist attraction area of the region. The hot springs, Afar culture and cultural games are other attraction areas.

In 2005, a giant rift was formed in just a few days. The rift opened when the Dabbahu Volcano, situated in the north of the region, erupted. The crack forming is thought to be part of the process in which the Arabian Plate, the Nubian Plate, and the Somali Plate, are moving apart. This new crack, 500 metres (1,640 ft) long, and 60 metres (197 ft) deep, opened when the lava from the erupting volcano flowed underground and cooled forming a 60 kilometres (37 mi) long, 8 metres (26 ft) wide dike within days.

== Environment ==
The Afar Depression, a plate tectonic triple junction, is found in the Afar Regional State. This geologic feature is one of Earth's great active volcanic areas. Due to this volcanic activity the floor of the depression is composed of lava, mostly basalt.

The continuous process of volcanism results in the occurrence of major minerals, including potash, sulfur, salt, bentonite and gypsum. In addition to these minerals, there are also promising geothermal energy sources and hot springs in different areas of the region. Most of the region's mineral potential are found in Dallol, Berhale and Afdera woredas of Zone Two. Elidar, Dubti and Millee in Zone One, and Gewane in Zone Three, also have some mineral possibilities.

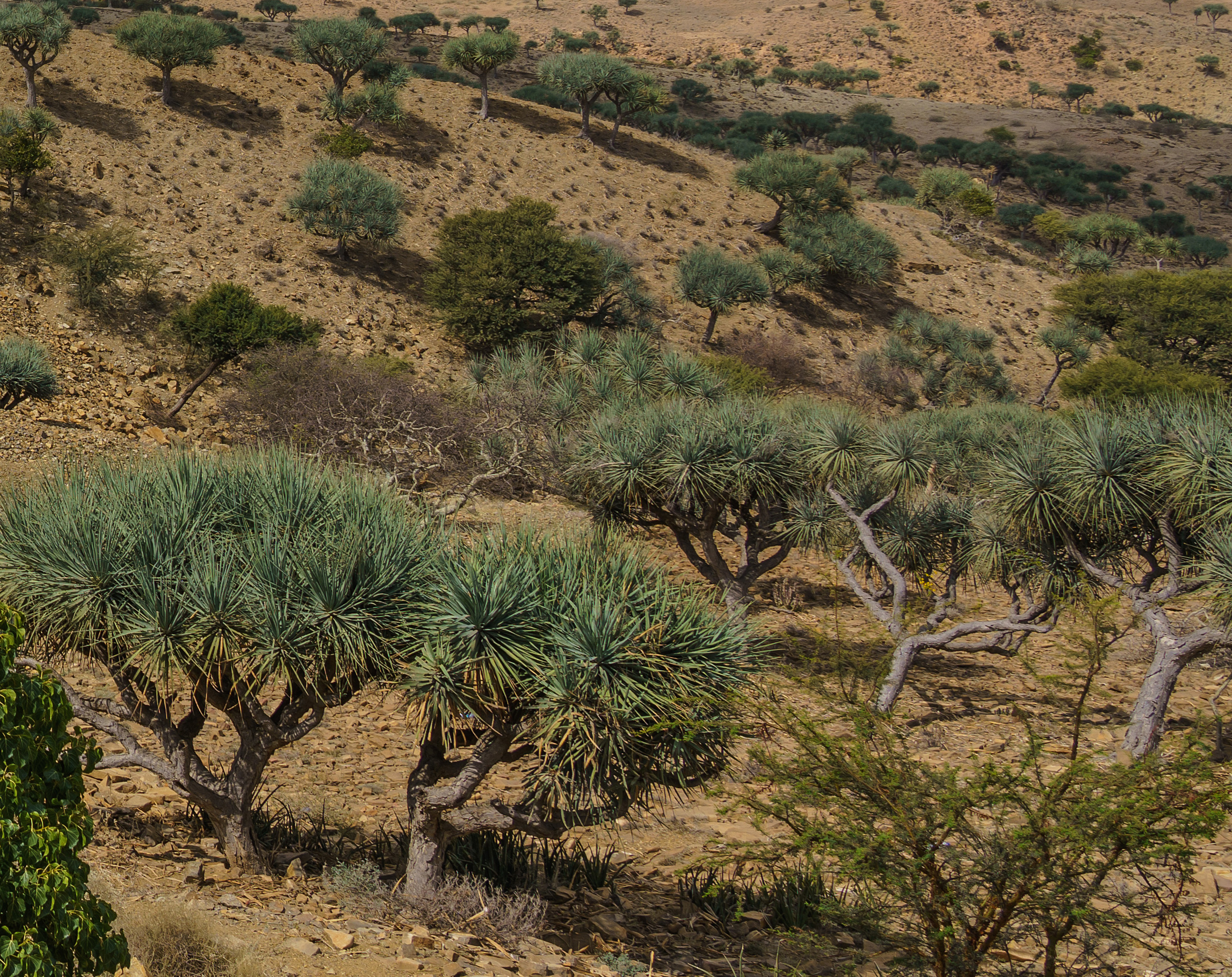
The Afar Region as a whole is sparsely vegetated, with plants like Dracaena ombet growing in the area.

Afar is home to peculiar wildlife, which notably include the African wild ass, Grevy's zebra, wild fox, wild cat, cheetah, and ostrich. These wild animals are found in the region's national parks. Because the region's tourism development is still in a poor state there are only two lodges in Awash National Park. It has many volcanoes, like Erta Ale.

== Agriculture ==
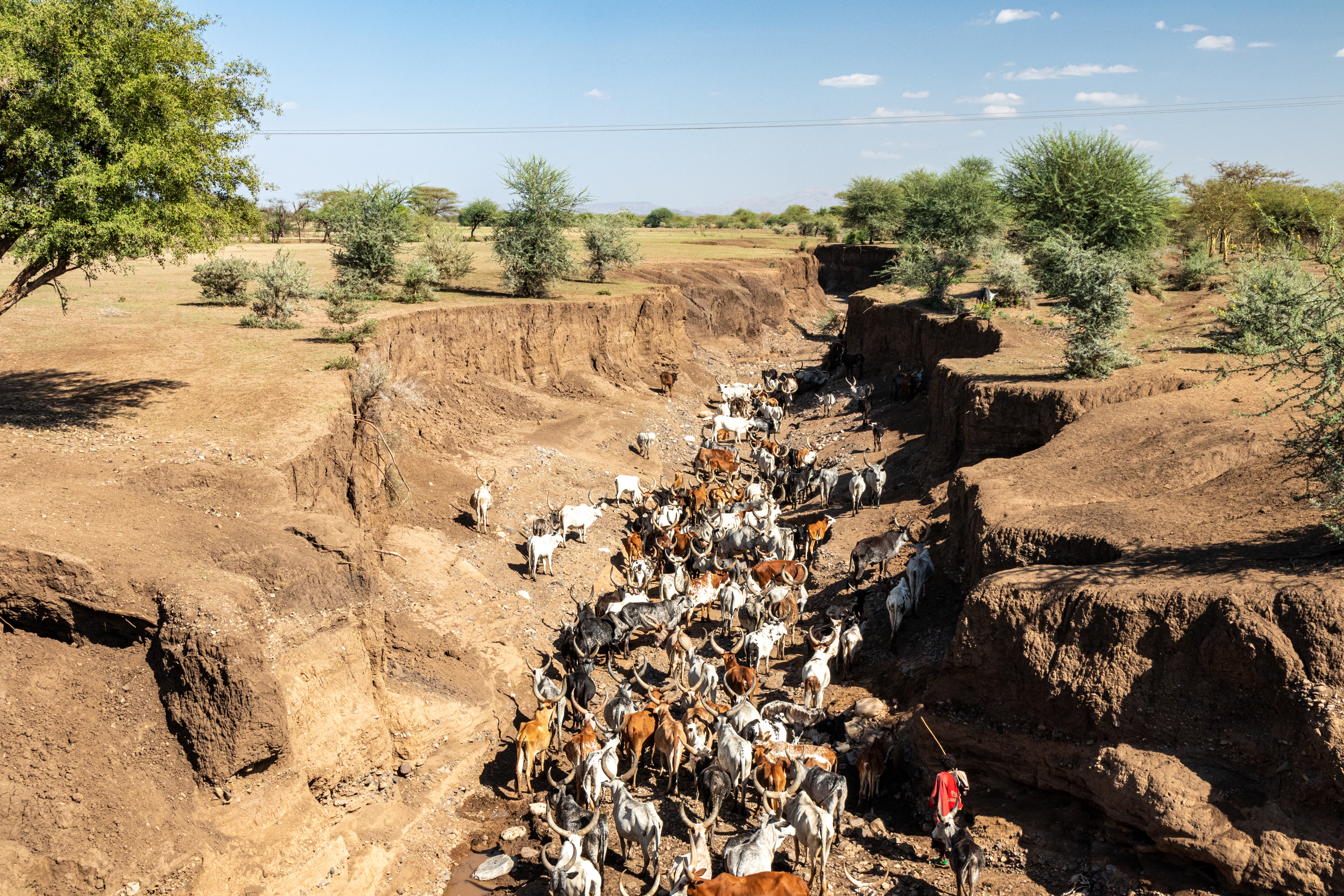
Cattle herd in riverbed of Afar Region

The CSA estimated in 2005 that farmers in the Afar Regional State had a total of 327,370 cattle (representing 0.84% of Ethiopia's total cattle), 196,390 sheep (1.13%), 483,780 goats (3.73%), 200 mules (0.14%), 12,270 asses (0.49%), 99,830 camels (21.85%), 38,320 poultry of all species (0.12%), and 810 beehives (less than 0.1%). The CSA estimated on the basis of a survey performed in December 2003 that nomadic inhabitants had 1,990,850 cattle (an 83.8% share of those animals in the region that year), 2,303,250 sheep (90.6%), 3,960,510 goats (90%), 759,750 camels (85.9%), 175,180 asses (92.5%), 2960 mules (88.6%), and 900 horses (100%).

== Regional instability ==
As of 2012, the area has been increasingly unstable, as tensions between Ethiopia and Eritrea remain high after the Eritrean–Ethiopian War of 1998 to 2000. On 18 January 2012, five foreign tourists were murdered while on holiday in the region. The Ethiopian government has accused Eritrean gunmen of being responsible for the attack. Many governments around the world advise against traveling to the Afar region, citing increasing security concerns.

Additionally, this region is also a hub for Afar–Somali clashes, due to many kebeles being put into the Afar region by the government. These include key towns like Gadamaytu, Undufo and Adaytu where battles between the Afar region and Somali region militaries happen. These conflicts have had many losses, and have led to the south-eastern parts of the region being an unstable zone.

== Fossil finds ==
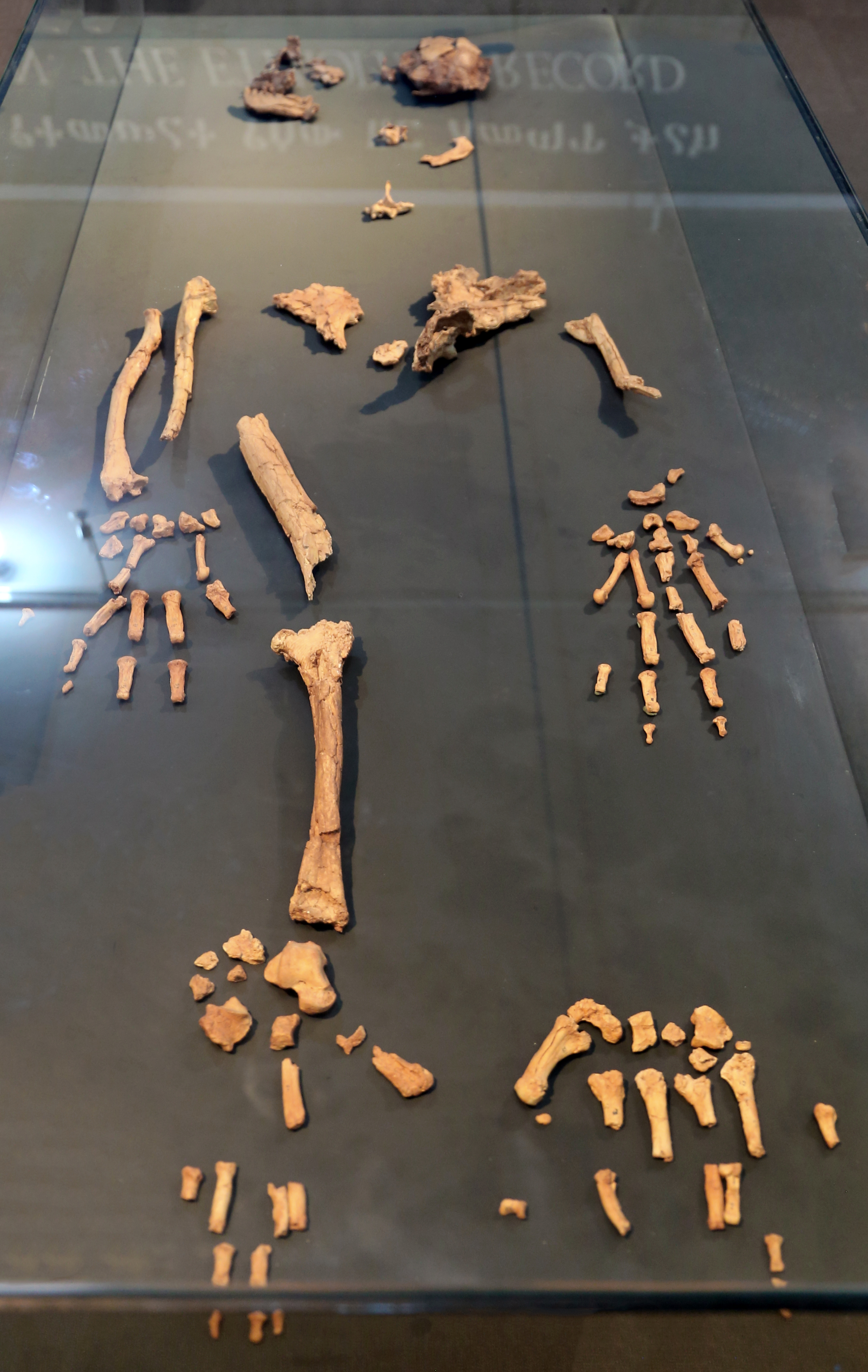
"Ardi", a 4.4 million year old hominid

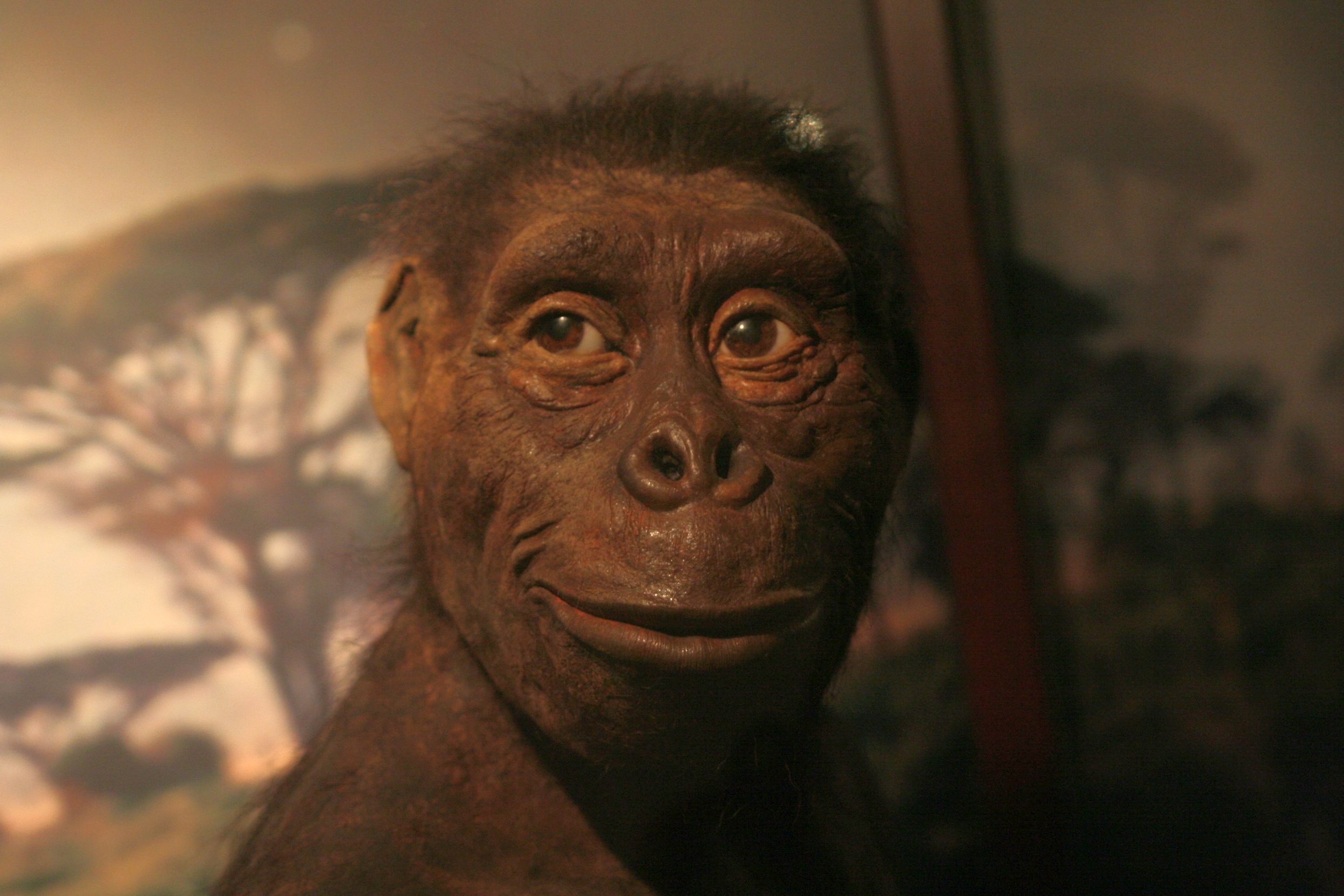
"Lucy"

Hadar, a community in Afar, was the site of the discovery in 1973–1974 of "Lucy", the Australopithecus afarensis skeletal remains, by Donald Johanson of the Cleveland Museum of Natural History. On 5 March 2005, another skeleton, estimated to be 3.8 million years old and said to be the world's oldest bipedal hominid skeleton, was found in the region. Yohannes Haile-Selassie led digs there each year from 2004 to 2007.

On 24 March 2006, it was reported that a "significantly complete" cranium had been found at Gawis in the Gona area. The cranium appears as an intermediate form between Homo erectus and Homo sapiens.

On 1 October 2009, scientists reported that they had found a skeleton, which dates to around 4.4 million years ago. Named Ardi, it is a form of the species Ardipithecus ramidus. The specimen is a distant cousin of the Australopithecus afarensis, Lucy's species.

In June 2010, the oldest direct evidence of stone tool manufacture was found in the Afar region and attributed to Australopithecus afarensis.

In 2013, a graduate student from the Arizona State University discovered a hominid jawbone in the Ledi-Geraru region of Afar. Scientists estimated that the fossil dates to around 2.8 million years ago, which is 400,000 years before the next oldest hominid fossil remains.

In 2015, a hominin jawbone and teeth was discovered in the Afar region. Scientists believe that the bones belonged to a previously undiscovered ancestor. The new species was named Australopithecus deyiremeda, meaning "close relative" in the native Afar language. The species lived around 3.5–3.3 million years ago, about the same time period as other hominins such as Australopithecus afarensis.

== List of Chief Administrators of the Afar Region ==
- Habib Alimirah (ALF): 1991? – 1995
- Hanfare Alimirah (ALF): September 1995 – March 1996
- Ismaqil Qali Siro (APDO/ANDP): March 1996 – September 2015
- Awol Arba Unde (acting): September 2015 – November 2015
- Seyoum Awol (ANDP): 16 November 2015 – 16 December 2018
- Awol Arba Unde (ANDP): 17 December 2018 – present

== Administrative zones ==
Like other regions in Ethiopia, Afar Region is subdivided into administrative zones, in case of Afar, into six zones (and one special woreda, an administrative subdivision which is administering under Gabi Rasu (South Zone)/(Zone 3).

- Awsi Rasu
- Kilbati Rasu
- Gabi Rasu
- Fanti Rasu
- Hari Rasu
- Mahi Rasu

== Towns ==
There are 47 towns in the Afar Region.

Town	Population 2007	Zone
Abala	10,301	Kilbatti Rasu
Adkuwa	1,757	Kilbatti Rasu
Afambo	822	Awsi Rasu
Afdera	3,578	Kilbatti Rasu
Alele Sulula	1,237	Fanti Rasu
Alelo	1,838	Fanti Rasu
Andido	546	Gabi Rasu
Asayta	16,052	Awsi Rasu
Awash	14,880	Gabi Rasu
Awash Arba	5,043	Gabi Rasu
Awash Sheleko	5,629	Gabi Rasu
Berahile	6,098	Kilbatti Rasu
Berta	350	Gabi Rasu
Bure	1,227	Awsi Rasu
Chiefera	9,132	Awsi Rasu
Dalifagi	4,979	Hari Rasu
Date Bahri	1,562	Awsi Rasu
Derayitu	1,651	Fanti Rasu
Dichoto	2,327	Awsi Rasu
Dobi	1,596	Awsi Rasu
Dubti	14,715	Awsi Rasu
Dulecha	1,190	Gabi Rasu
Elidar	1,639	Awsi Rasu
Eliwuha	5,390	Awsi Rasu
Gachine	2,166	Gabi Rasu
Galafi	580	Awsi Rasu
Gebdora	790	Fanti Rasu
Gewane	5,986	Gabi Rasu
Hadeleala	2,119	Hari Rasu
Keliwan	3,925	Fanti Rasu
Kifil Sost	1,330	Gabi Rasu
Konaba	3,031	Kilbatti Rasu
Kumame	935	Hari Rasu
Lakora	749	Kilbatti Rasu
Lile	703	Kilbatti Rasu
Logiya	14,038	Awsi Rasu
Manda	1,654	Awsi Rasu
Melka Sedi	5,492	Gabi Rasu
Melka Werer	7,817	Gabi Rasu
Mile	8,818	Awsi Rasu
Namelafen	1,950	Hari Rasu
Sa'ala	558	Awsi Rasu
Sabure	1,969	Gabi Rasu
Samera	2,625	Awsi Rasu
Serkam	1,930	Gabi Rasu
Wedarage	2,280	Hari Rasu
Wuha Limat	151	Awsi Rasu

== See also ==
- List of districts in the Afar region
- Regions of Ethiopia
