= Dams and reservoirs in Ethiopia =

Ethiopia is called the water tower of Africa due to its combination of mountainous areas with a comparatively large share of water resources in Africa. Only a fraction of this potential has been harnessed so far, 1% at the beginning of the 21st century. In order to become the powerhouse of Africa, Ethiopia is actively exploiting its water resources by building dams, reservoirs, irrigation and diversion canals and hydropower stations. The benefits of the dams are not only limited to hydropower. Many dams are multi-purpose dams that are also designed to provide water for irrigation, drinking water and flood control. However, hydropower is expected to be the main benefit of the dams.

== List of dams and reservoirs ==
Reservoir	Coordinates	1st use	2nd use	3rd use	Commissioned	River	Drainage basin	Total reservoir size [km^{3}]	Dam + height [m]	Irrigation area [km^{2}]	Remarks
Aba Samuel	8.788°N 38.706°E	hydropower	flood control		1932	Akaki	Afar Triangle	0.035	22		siltation
Alwero	7.872°N 34.499°E	irrigation			1995	Alwero	Nile	0.075	yes		
Amerti	9.789°N 37.269°E	hydropower	irrigation		2011	Fincha	Nile	0.04	38	127	
Angereb	12.613°N 37.486°E	drinking water	irrigation		1986	Lesser Angereb	Nile	0.005	yes		siltation
Arjo Didessa	8.520°N 36.669°E	irrigation	flood control		2026	Didessa	Nile	2.3	47 / 17 / 10	800	3 dams in total
Chomen Lake	9.561°N 37.413°E	hydropower	drinking water	irrigation	1973	Fincha	Nile	0.65	20		
Dire	9.148°N 38.934°E	drinking water			1999	Dire	Afar Triangle	0.019	yes		
Geba	8.211°N 36.073°E	irrigation	hydropower		U/C	Gebba	Nile	1.4	46; 70	4,800	
Gefersa	9.064°N 38.642°E	drinking water			1955	Akaki	Afar Triangle	0.007	yes		
Genale Dawa III	5.51°N 39.718°E	hydropower	flood control		2017	Ganale	Jubba	2.6	110		
Genale Dawa VI	5.68°N 40.93°E	hydropower	irrigation		U/C	Ganale	Jubba	0.18	39	270	
GERD	11.214°N 35.089°E	hydropower	flood control	fishing	2025	Blue Nile	Nile	74	145		irrigation in Sudan
Gidabo	6.438°N 38.168°E	irrigation	flood control	fishing	2018	Gidabo	Rift Valley	0.063	21.3	270	
Gilgel Gibe I	7.831°N 37.322°E	hydropower	flood control	siltation sink	2004	Gilgel Gibe	Turkana Basin	0.92	40		severe siltation
Gilgel Gibe III	6.844°N 37.301°E	hydropower	flood control	fishing	2015	Omo	Turkana Basin	14.7	246		
Kessem	9.150°N 39.883°E	irrigation	drinking water		2015	Kessem	Afar Triangle	0.5	90	200	
Koka Lake	8.468°N 39.156°E	hydropower	flood control	fishing	1960	Awash	Afar Triangle	1.9	47		severe siltation
Koysha	6.584°N 36.565°E	hydropower	fishing		U/C	Omo	Turkana Basin	6	180		
Legedadi _{az}	9.068°N 38.962°E	drinking water			1967	Sendafa	Afar Triangle	0.044	yes		siltation
Megech	12.505°N 37.462°E	irrigation	drinking water		U/C	Magech	Nile	1.8	76	170	
Melka Wakena	7.225°N 39.462°E	hydropower	drinking water		1989	Shebelle	Shebelle	0.75	42		siltation
Midmar Lake	14.204°N 38.911°E	drinking water	irrigation		1996	Wari	Nile	0.01	yes		
Neshe	9.789°N 37.269°E	hydropower	irrigation		2011	Fincha	Nile	0.15	38	127	
Omo Kuraz	6.302°N 36.053°E	irrigation			U/C	Omo	Turkana Basin	?	22.4	1,000	
Rib	12.031°N 38.008°E	irrigation	flood control	drinking water	2017	Rib	Nile	0.234	74	200	
Tekeze	13.348°N 38.742°E	hydropower	flood control	fishing	2010	Tekeze	Nile	9.3	188		siltation
Tendaho	11.690°N 40.955°E	irrigation	drinking water	flood control	2014	Awash	Afar Triangle	1.9	53	600	
Wedecha-Belebla	8.938°N 39.007°E	irrigation			1996		Afar Triangle	0.001	yes	3	
Zarema May-Day	13.738°N 37.800°E	irrigation	fishing		U/C	Zarema	Nile	3.6	135	500	

List with an emphasis on construction-related information.

Name	Commissioning	Basin	Contractor	Financing	Cost	Remarks
Koka	1960	Awash River				
Fincha	1973	Fincha (Blue Nile)				
Gilgel Gibe I	2004	Gilgel Gibe River	Salini (bid)	World Bank	$331m	
Tekezé	2009	Tekeze (Atbara)	Sinohydro Corporation (bid)	Chinese	$365m	
Gilgel Gibe III	2015	Omo River	Salini (no bid)	Ethiopian government and Industrial and Commercial Bank of China	Euro 1.55bn	faces stiff environmental criticism
Amerti & Neshe	2012	Fincha (Blue Nile)	China Gezhouba Group Co. (CGGC)	Exim Bank of China	$276m	
Tendaho	2014	Awash River	EWWCE		?	
Genale Dawa III	2017	between Oromo and Somali state	Chinese CGGC	Chinese	$408m	
GERD	2025	Blue Nile River	Salini	Government	Euro 4.8 billion	awarded without competitive bid, conflict with Egypt over water usage rights
Koysha	construction started 2016	Gibe River	Salini	Government	Euro 2.5 billion	secured a grant from an Italian credit firm to fund the project 2016.

Weighing the benefits and costs of large dams is far from easy. The following sections describe the impacts of the dams in more detail as objectively as possible, in order to provide a basis for such an assessment by the reader. They have to be compared with the planned use, see above.

== Issues ==
The construction of large dams entails many tangible and intangible costs. The financial cost itself is already substantial. Resettlement adds to the social costs of the dams. Sedimentation from unchecked erosion in the upper watershed of rivers reduces the lifespan of reservoirs. Environmental costs are imposed on communities living downstream of the dams in Ethiopia. And neighboring countries, in particularly Egypt, see their historical water rights affected and threaten to take action against the dams. The almost exclusive reliance on hydropower makes electricity generation vulnerable to droughts, which may be exacerbated by climate change. Earthquakes can also endanger the dams and associated tunnels. There were a total of 16 recorded earthquakes of magnitude 6.5 and higher in Ethiopia's seismic active areas in the 20th century. Last but not least, the dams are built in an environment of poor governance: Most contracts have been awarded without competitive bidding, raising the suspicion of corruption. The above concerns have hampered access to financing from international financial institutions, slowing down the dam building program.

=== Financial costs ===
The financial costs of large dams in Ethiopia that have been completed after 2009 and were scheduled to be completed until 2014 is estimated at about US$11 billion, or about one third of Ethiopia's annual GDP. This does not include the cost to build transmission lines and to expand the distribution grid.

Given very low electricity tariffs in Ethiopia, the dams are not likely to generate a large financial rate of return, except if generation is subsidized by the government which itself is cash-strapped. Since many dams will be financed through loans, the heavy investment program – to the extent it is not being financed directly by the government outside the balance sheet of the national power utility EEPCo – could jeopardize the financial health of EEPCo. If the utility should become bankrupt, loan guarantees from the Ethiopian government would be called, thus imposing a potentially high financial cost on the government in addition to the investment subsidies from the government for the construction of the dams. Furthermore, the Central Bank of Ethiopia has issued bonds to finance the construction of the Grand Ethiopian Renaissance Dam, the largest of all dams in Ethiopia. These subsidies have a high opportunity cost, since the scarce government funds are not available for other investments in education, health, agriculture or forestry.

=== Delays and technical challenges ===
Large dam projects are prone to delays. The dams built in Ethiopia are no exception to the rule and all have been delayed by at least one year. A complex geology has been one of the reasons for the delays, leading to landslides and tunnel collapses. The Gibe II dam has been affected by such problems even after its completion, when a tunnel collapsed and put the hydropower plant out of service for several months. The grand Ethiopian renaissance dam was delayed as well, because of upgrading the power from 5250 watt to 6000 watt, budget problems and dispute with government of Egypt.

=== Resettlement ===
There has been no estimate of the overall number of people that would have to be resettled to make room for dams and reservoirs in Ethiopia. Since most dams are to be built in narrow valleys, the areas to be inundated are not as large as, for example, in the case of Lake Nasser in Egypt. Lake Nasser covers an area of more than 5,000 km2 and displaced more than 60,000 people. Resettlement at Gibe has been implemented satisfactorily according to the World Bank, in compliance with the institutions’ resettlement policies. However, the NGO International Rivers conducted a survey of resettled families finding that many of the 5,000 resettled people complain about the living conditions at the resettlement sites.

=== Siltation ===
Ethiopia's rivers carry a high silt content, due to heavy erosion which is accelerated by deforestation and inappropriate agricultural practices on steep mountain slopes. The reservoir of one of Ethiopia's oldest large dams, the Awash dam commissioned in 1966, is close to reaching the end of its useful life due to siltation. While most of the newly constructed dams are much larger than the Awash dam and thus have a longer lifetime, they will also ultimately silt up. Estimates of the lifetime of the dams are not available. There have been few efforts to manage the watersheds upstream of the new dams through terracing or reforestation.

=== Droughts ===
Hydropower generation is vulnerable to droughts. The first large hydropower plant in Ethiopia, the Tekeze dam, was out of production for most of its first year after commissioning because of drought. The distribution of dams over two different river basins reduces somewhat the risk of drought, which nevertheless remains substantial. The Ethiopian government has awarded contracts for wind parks in 2010. However, their size is small compared to the hydropower plants and more than 95% of the future installed capacity in Ethiopia is from hydropower, despite a large potential for wind, solar and geothermal power.

=== Transboundary impacts ===
Almost all of the dams planned by Ethiopia are either located in the Nile River basin or on the Omo River. Both rivers are shared with Ethiopia's neighbors and for none of them an international water sharing agreement exists. Ethiopia participates in the Nile Basin Initiative, a forum for dialogue with the other Nile riparians.

While hydropower does not consume water, the filling (impoundment) of reservoirs reduces the water flow once. In addition, evaporation from the reservoir surfaces constitutes a permanent loss of water from the river. Irrigation also consumes water that is not available any more for downstream uses.

The Blue Nile and the Atbara both drain to the main Nile River. Ethiopia has no agreement with Egypt or Sudan about the sharing of the river's water. Egypt says that its historic water rights would be violated by dams in Ethiopia and that its water security would be affected. Egypt and Sudan concluded a water sharing treaty in 1959. The agreement does not consider the water rights of other Nile riparian states. It has never been recognized by Ethiopia. The three countries did, however, sign the Declaration of Principles in 2015 which makes no reference to historical treaties and encourages cooperation and equitable use of Nile waters. It is not known exactly to what extent dams in Ethiopia would reduce the flow of water to Sudan and Ethiopia. Assuming an evaporation rate of 1 meter per year, an irrigated area of 200,000 hectares and a combined reservoir area of 1,000 km2, the flow of the Nile could be reduced by 3 billion cubic meters per year, equivalent to about 5 percent of the current allocation of Egypt under the 1959 agreement.

The Omo River flows to Lake Turkana in Kenya. Kenya has not expressed concerns about downstream impacts on Lake Turkana, although NGOs have done so.

=== Governance ===
Contracts to build the first dams in Ethiopia constructed under the government of Meles Zenawi, who came to power in 1991, have been awarded after competitive bidding. This is the case of the Gilgel Gibe I dam built by the Italian firm Salini under World Bank financing and the Tekeze dam built by the Chinese firm CWHEC with Chinese financing. Both contracts were awarded in the 1990s. However, soon afterwards the Ethiopian government changed its policy and decided to award contracts directly without competitive bidding. Since then, all construction contracts for dams and associated infrastructure have been awarded directly, giving rise to the suspicion of corruption. Three large contracts have been awarded directly to one firm, Salini Costruttori of Italy. Five more large contracts have been awarded to two Chinese firms.

The NGO International Rivers reports that “conversations with civil society groups in Ethiopia indicate that questioning the government’s energy sector plans is highly risky, and there are legitimate concerns of government persecution. Because of this political climate, no groups are actively pursuing the issues surrounding hydropower dams, nor publicly raising concerns about the risks. In this situation, extremely limited and inadequate public consultation has been organized” during the implementation of major dams.

== See also ==
- Energy in Ethiopia
- Water politics in the Nile Basin
- Water supply and sanitation in Ethiopia
