= Gilgel Gibe III Dam =

Dam in South Ethiopia Regional State, Ethiopia

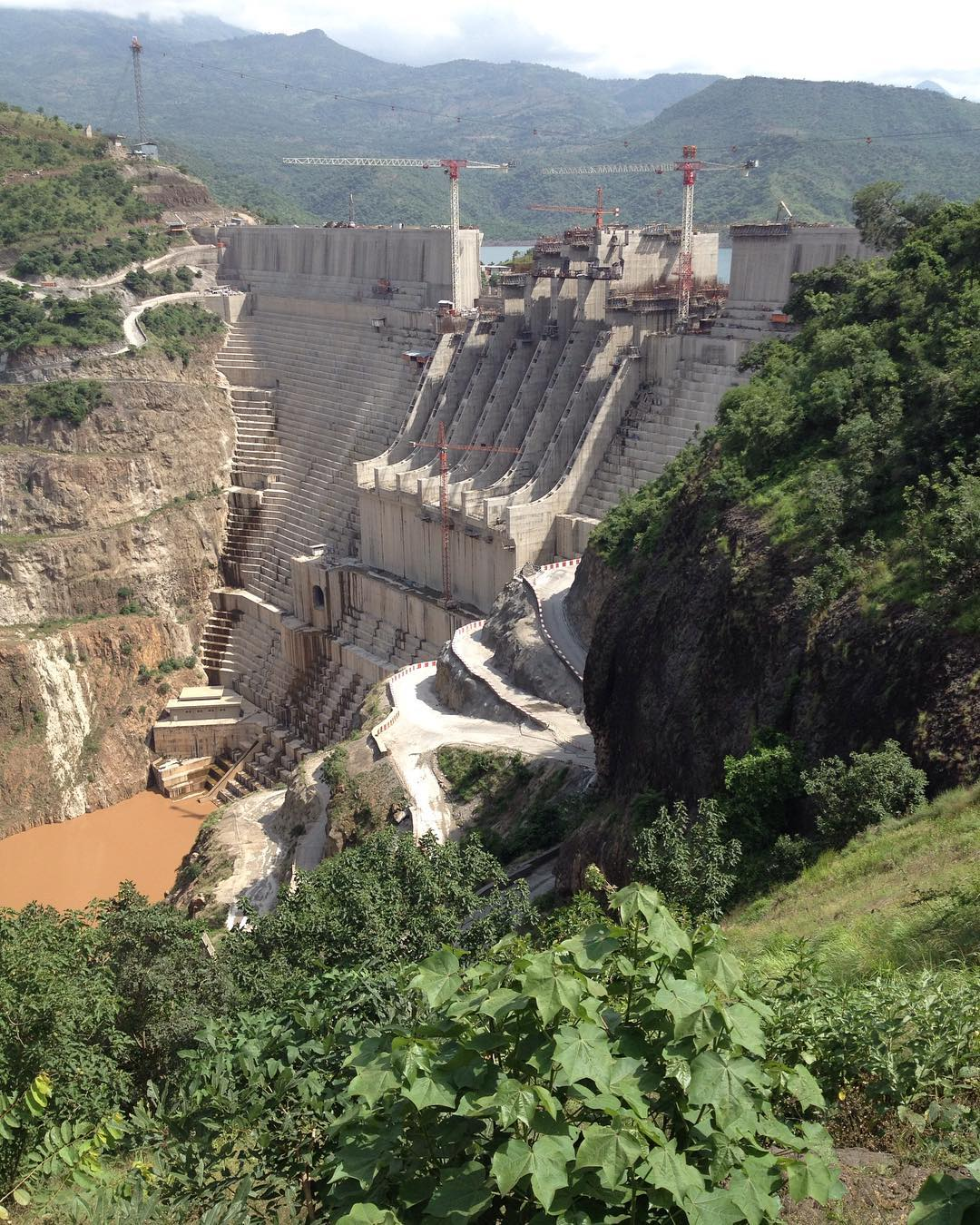

- Location within Ethiopia
- Country: Ethiopia
- Location: between Wolayita Zone and Dawro Zone, Southern Nations, Nationalities, and Peoples' Region
- Coordinates: 6°50′50″N 37°18′5″E
- Purpose: Power
- Status: Operational; power station undergoing commissioning
- Construction began: 2006
- Opening date: October 2015; 11 years ago
- Construction cost: US$1.8 billion
- Owner: Ethiopian Electric Power

Dam and spillways
- Type of dam: Gravity, roller compacted concrete
- Impounds: Omo River
- Height: 246 m (807 ft)
- Length: 610 m (2,000 ft)
- Spillways: 1
- Spillway type: floodgate
- Spillway capacity: 18,000 m^{3}/s (640,000 cu ft/s)

Reservoir
- Creates: Gilgel Gibe III Reservoir
- Total capacity: 14.7 km^{3} (11,900,000 acre⋅ft)
- Active capacity: 11.75 km^{3} (9,530,000 acre⋅ft)
- Inactive capacity: 2.95 km^{3} (2,390,000 acre⋅ft)
- Catchment area: 34,150 km^{2} (13,190 mi^{2})
- Surface area: 210 km^{2} (81 mi^{2})
- Normal elevation: 893 m (2,930 ft)

Power Station
- Commission date: 2015-2016
- Type: Conventional
- Turbines: 10 x 187 MW Francis-type
- Installed capacity: 1,870 MW
- Annual generation: 6,500 GWh Est.

The Gilgel Gibe III Dam is a 246 m high roller-compacted concrete dam with an associated hydroelectric power plant on the Omo River in Ethiopia. It is located about 62 km (39 mi) west of Sodo in the South Ethiopia Regional State. At the time of its full commissioning the dam was the third largest hydroelectric plant in Africa with a power output of about 1,870 Megawatt (MW), thus more than doubling Ethiopia's total installed capacity from its 2007 level of 814 MW. The Gibe III dam is part of the Gibe cascade, a series of dams including the existing Gibe I dam (184 MW) and Gibe II power station (420 MW) as well as the planned Gibe IV (1,472 MW) and Gibe V (560 MW) dams. The existing dams are owned and operated by the state-owned Ethiopian Electric Power, which is also the client for the Gibe III Dam.

The US$1.8 billion project began in 2006, electricity generation started in October 2015. The remaining generators were operational by 2016. The project has experienced serious delays; in May 2012, full commissioning had been scheduled for June 2013. The dam was inaugurated by Prime Minister Hailemariam Desalegn on 17 December 2016.

Local and international environmental groups forecast major negative environmental and social impacts of the dam and criticized the project's environmental and social impact assessment as insufficient. Because of this and accusations that the entire approval process for the project was suspect, funding for the full construction cost was not secured, as the African Development Bank delayed a decision about a loan pending a review of the dam's environmental impact by its compliance review and mediation unit. This dates back to August 2009 when they accepted a call from NGOs for such a review. In August 2010 Ethiopian prime minister Meles Zenawi vowed to complete the dam "at any cost", saying the dam's critics "don’t want to see Africa developed; they want us to remain undeveloped and backward to serve their tourists as a museum."

== Design ==
The Gilgel Gibe III Dam is 610 m-long (2,000 ft) and 246 m (807 ft) high roller-compacted concrete dam. It withholds a reservoir capacity of 14.7 km^{3} (3.5 mi^{3}) and a surface area of 210 km^{2} (81 mi^{2}), collected from a catchment area of 34,150 km^{2} (13,190 mi^{2}). The reservoir's live (active or "useful") storage is 11.75 km^{3} (2.82 mi^{3}) and dead storage of 2.95 km^{3} (0.71 mi^{3}). The normal operating level of the reservoir is 892 m (2,927 ft) above sea level with a maximum of 893 m (2,930 ft) and a minimum of 800 m (2,600 ft). The dam's spillway is 108 m (354 ft) long and floodgate-controlled with a maximum discharge capacity of 18,000 m^{3}/s (640,000 cu ft/s). Water above 873 m (2,864 ft) above sea level can be discharged through its gates. Feeding the dam's power house are two penstocks that each branch into five separate tunnels for each individual turbine. The power house contains ten 187 MW generators supported by Francis turbines for a total installed capacity of 1,870 MW.

The initial design of the dam foresaw a rock-fill dam. However, due to difficulties with obtaining proper and sufficient insurance coverage for the rock-fill dam, the design was changed to roller-compacted concrete.

== Benefits ==
The main benefit of the dam is electricity generation that is both renewable and dispatchable. It was forecast to supply about half of its power to Ethiopia and export the other half to Kenya (500 MW), Sudan (200 MW) and Djibouti (200 MW). However, there were long delays in making Power Purchase Agreements. Only Kenya signed a Memorandum of Understanding to purchase electricity from the dam. Financing for a transmission line to Kenya was approved by the World Bank in July 2012.

Access to the electricity grid in Ethiopia currently is very low. Less than 2% of Ethiopia's rural population, which accounts for 85% of the total population, have access to the grid. With the support of the World Bank the government is carrying out an ambitious project to expand rural electricity access. In 2003, low generation capacity combined with a severe drought caused power cuts lasting 15 hours twice a week for a period of six months, costing an estimated $200 million in economic output. In 2008 and 2009, Ethiopia again experienced power cuts and brownouts. According to the International Rivers Network the power cuts were caused by drought, because almost all electricity generation in Ethiopia is hydroelectric. According to the same source, despite an increase in access to the electric grid, electricity consumption is likely to remain low for the foreseeable future due to the prevailing level of poverty. Even without the Gibe III hydro plant, according to one source, Ethiopia had a surplus installed capacity of 400 megawatts. Under Ethiopia's current development plans it is said the country will be more than 95% dependent on hydroelectric power. Ethiopia has predicted that electricity exports will generate around $407 million revenue per year, exceeding the value of the country's next most valuable export, coffee.

A secondary benefit of the project is flood protection. In 2006, a flood claimed the lives of at least 360 people and thousands of livestock in the lower Omo River basin. A further benefit is the reduction in the impact of droughts, including through large state-owned irrigated sugar plantations.

== Controversy ==
The project is controversial because of its environmental and social impact, the magnitude of which in itself is a subject of controversy; because of the award of the construction contract without competitive bidding; and because of an alleged lack of transparency in project affairs. For example, the environmental and social impact assessment was not published until two years after construction began. The assessment suggested that the project would cause minimal problems environmentally and socially. However, critics consider it to be flawed both in terms of thoroughness and objectivity. Among these critics is the African Resources Working Group who released statements saying that "The quantitative [and qualitative] data included in virtually all major sections of the report were clearly selected for their consistence with the predetermined objective of validating the completion of the Gibe III hydro-dam" and that despite claims made by the government to the contrary, the dam would "produce a broad range of negative effects, some of which would be catastrophic." Another prominent critic of the dam is the Kenyan paleoanthropologist Richard Leakey who said that "the project is fatally flawed in terms of its logic, in terms of its thoroughness, in terms of its conclusions".

In June 2011 UNESCO's World Heritage Committee, in its 35th session held in Paris, France, called for the construction of the dam to be halted, to submit all assessments of the dam and requested Ethiopia and Kenya to invite a World Heritage Centre/IUCN monitoring mission to review the dam's impact on Lake Turkana, a World Heritage Site.

== Environmental and social impact ==
According to the Ethiopian authorities, once the dam has been built the total amount of water flowing into the lake will not change. The only difference would be a more stable flow over the year - more during the dry season, and less during the wet. Ethiopian prime minister Meles Zenawi said in a BBC interview: "The overall environmental impact of the project is highly beneficial. It increases the amount of water in the river system, it completely regulates flooding, which was a major problem, it improves the livelihood of people downstream because they will have irrigation projects, and it does not in any way negatively affect the Turkana Lake. This is what our studies show."

According to critics, the dam will be potentially devastating to the indigenous population. The dam will stop the seasonal flood, which will impact the lower reach of the Omo River and Lake Turkana as well as the people who rely on these ecosystems for their livelihoods. According to Terri Hathaway, director of International Rivers' Africa programme, Gibe III is "the most destructive dam under construction in Africa." The project would condemn "half a million of the region's most vulnerable people to hunger and conflict."

=== Impact on the livelihoods of the inhabitants of the lower Omo River Valley ===
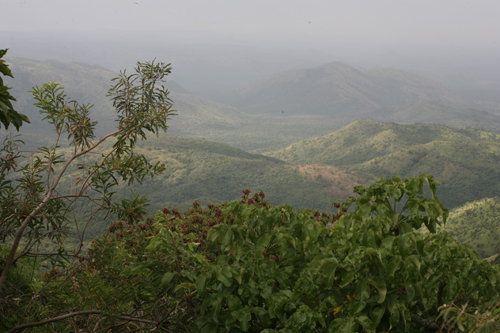
Omo River Valley in 2010

It is estimated that more than 200,000 people rely on the Omo River below the dam for some form of subsistence such as flood recession agriculture, and many of these ethnic groups live in chronic hunger. Critics state that the Gibe III dam may worsen their situation. Indigenous people rely on recessional cultivation of food along the riverbanks, as well as livestock herding, for survival. The Gibe III dam and the associated decrease in water levels and seasonality of flows in the Omo River threaten the continuation of the only two options for survival in this arid environment—there are no alternatives. The people living in the project area are part of the Southern Nations of Ethiopia, a highly diverse group of people. Ethnic groups affected by the dam include eight distinct indigenous communities: the Mursi, Bodi (Mekan), Muguji (Kwegu), Kara (Karo), Hamer, Bashada, Nyangatom and Daasanach.

Stephen Corry, Director of the indigenous rights organization Survival International said, "The Gibe III dam will be a disaster of cataclysmic proportions for the tribes of the Omo valley. Their land and livelihoods will be destroyed, yet few have any idea what lies ahead. The government has violated Ethiopia’s constitution and international law in the procurement process. No respectable outside body should be funding this atrocious project." Other sources note that, when interviewed, people in many villages have never even heard of the Gibe III dam, and many of them did not even know what a dam was. This is an indication of the failure of consultations and informed consent for the indigenous populations. Survival, together with the Campaign for the Reform of the World Bank, Counter Balance coalition, Friends of Lake Turkana and International Rivers have launched a petition to stop the dam.

Dam proponents argue that artificial floods are planned to be released from the reservoir. Furthermore, irrigation projects are envisaged to improve the livelihoods of the downstream population. As it became known to a wider public in November 2011 through a report by the Oakland Institute, there are indeed massive plans for cotton and sugarcane plantations on 445,000 ha in the lower Omo Valley. The sugarcane plantations could be financed with aid from India, which is heavily engaged in developing Ethiopian sugar production. The investors in the plantations are mostly Ethiopian state-owned companies.

=== Reports about human rights violations ===
There are also reports about human rights violations by the Ethiopian army against locals who oppose the sugar plantations in the lower Omo Valley that would be irrigated with water from the dam's reservoir. According to the reports, "villagers are expected to voice immediate support, otherwise beatings (including the use of tasers), abuse, and general intimidation occurs", (...) "instilling a sense of fear regarding any opposition to sugar plantation plans."

=== Impact on the ecosystems of the lower Omo River Valley ===
The decreased water flow of the Omo River resulting from the Gibe III dam will have significant impacts on the ecosystems surrounding the river. The Omo River Basin is home to the only pristine riparian forest remaining in the drylands of sub-Saharan Africa. The survival of this forest is dependent upon the seasonal flooding of the Omo River, which will cease with construction of the dam. This may cause 290 km^{2} of forest to "dry out" from lack of water. The decreased water flow will also negatively impact, if not eliminate, all economic activities associated with the Omo River such as farming, fishing, and tourism. The water level of the Omo River is crucial for recharging groundwater supplies in the Omo basin. If the water level of the river drops once the Gibe III dam is built, then it will no longer be able to refill underground water supplies, leaving much of the basin bereft of groundwater, which negatively impacts people and ecosystems. As the water level of the Omo River drops, the erosion of its riverbanks will increase, causing increased sediment flows in the river, loss of soil for crop cultivation along the riverbanks, and loss of riparian habitats.

A December 2012 study stated Ethiopia's Gibe III dam would cause humanitarian catastrophe and major cross-border armed conflict.

Construction of one of the world's tallest dams on the Omo River in southern Ethiopia will lead to mass starvation among a half million indigenous people in an already famine-prone region, sparking major armed conflict in the three-nation border region over its disappearing natural resources, according to a new report from the African Resources Working Group (ARWG).

"Humanitarian Catastrophe and Regional Armed Conflict Brewing in the Transborder Region of Ethiopia, Kenya, and South Sudan: The Proposed Gibe III Dam in Ethiopia" analyzes the full scale of impacts of the dam and charges that no environmental or social review of the full cross-border impact area has been carried out by the Ethiopian government or international development banks involved in the project, including the World Bank. It is authored by a member of the ARWG and long-term researcher in the region, Claudia J. Carr, an associate professor at the University of California, Berkeley. The 250-page report is based on substantial field-based research involving the participation of local residents throughout much of the cross-border region.

The Gibe III dam is already under construction by Ethiopia along its Omo River, with general recognition that it will cause a major decrease in river flow downstream and a serious reduction of inflow to Kenya's Lake Turkana, which receives 90 per cent of its waters from the river. According to the ARWG report, these changes will destroy the survival means of at least 200,000 pastoralists, flood-dependent agriculturalists and fishers along the Omo River 300,000 pastoralists and fishers around the shores of Lake Turkana - plunging the region's ethnic groups into cross-border violent conflict reaching well into South Sudan, as starvation confronts all of them.

The report offers a devastating look a deeply flawed development process fueled by the special interests of global finance and African governments. In the process, it identifies major overlooked or otherwise minimized risks, not the least of which is a U.S. Geological Survey estimation of a high risk for a magnitude 7 or 8 earthquake in the Gibe III dam region.

Professor Carr in her new book further examines how development processes driven by international finance, African governments and the global consulting industry can lead to such disastrous outcomes for the vast number of people affected by such development.

=== Impact on Lake Turkana ===
The magnitude of the impact that the dam and possible irrigation projects induced by the dam will have on the water level of Lake Turkana is controversial. A hydrological study conducted for the African Development Bank in November 2010 concluded that the filling of the dam will reduce the lake's water level by two metres, if no irrigation will be undertaken. Irrigation would cause a further drop in the lake level.

Friends of Lake Turkana, a Kenyan organization representing indigenous groups in northwestern Kenya whose livelihoods are linked to Lake Turkana, had previously estimated that the dam could reduce the level of Lake Turkana by up to 10 meter affecting up to 300,000 people. This could cause the brackish water to increase in salinity to where it may no longer be drinkable by the indigenous groups around the lake. Currently, the salinity of the water is about 2332 mg/L, and it is estimated that a 10-meter decrease in the water level of Lake Turkana could cause the salinity to rise to 3.397 g/L. Raising salinity could also drastically reduce the number of fish in the lake, which the people around Lake Turkana depend on for sustenance and their livelihoods. According to critics, this "will condemn the lake to a not-so-slow death."

According to dam proponents, the impact on Lake Turkana will be limited to the temporary reduction in flows during the filling of the reservoir. Various sources state that the filling could take between one and three wet seasons. The total storage volume of the reservoir of Gibe III dam will be between 11.75 and 14 billion cubic metres, depending on sources. According to the company that builds the dam, this would reduce the water level in the lake by "less than 50 cm per year for three years" and that salinity "will not change in any way".

According to the International Lake Environment Committee, 90% of Lake Turkana's water is delivered by the Omo River on which the Dam would be built. With no outlet, Lake Turkana loses 2.3 meters of water every year to evaporation, and its level is sensitive to climatic and seasonal fluctuations. For purposes of comparison, the historic level of Lake Turkana declined from a high of 20 m above today's level in the 1890s to the same level as today in the 1940s and 1950s. It then increased again gradually by 7 metres to reach a peak around 1980, and subsequently decreased again.

The Environmental and Social Impact Assessment (ESIA) summary of the project did not assess the impact of the dam on the water level and water quality of Lake Turkana. The director of Kenya's Water Services Regulatory Board, John Nyaoro, argued that the dam would have no negative impact on Lake Turkana.

=== Other impacts ===
It was predicted that there is about a 50-75% leakage of waters from the reservoir due to multiple fractures in the basalt at the planned reservoir site. Due to the loss of water in reservoir, the dam would not be able to produce as much electricity and less hydro power would be available to export to other nearby countries. Also, the dam and reservoir are vulnerable to seismic activity due to earthquakes and massive landslides in the Gibe III project region. Earthquakes can cause even larger fractures to the dam and are susceptible to more water leakage as well as decreasing the economic inputs. Moreover, the landslides would fill up the reservoir and less water can be stored. This would also mean that less hydro power will be produced.

=== Environmental and social impact assessment ===
Controversy arose also due to the environmental and social impact assessment and preceding environmental impact study (EIS) were not done until two years after beginning construction on the dam. The Ethiopian Environmental Protection Authority requires that an environmental impact assessment be done for any project "likely to entail significant adverse environmental impacts" and that "the EIS must be submitted before commencing any construction or any other implementation of the project."

==== Official environmental and social impact assessment ====
An Environmental and Social Impact Assessment (ESIA) has been carried out by Centro Elettrotecnico Sperimentale Italiano (CESI) and Agriconsulting of Italy, in association with MDI Consulting Engineers from Ethiopia. According to Anthony Mitchell, an engineer who submitted an independent feasibility study of the dam to the African Development Bank, CESI's owners include vendors who can benefit from the project and this conflict of interest is not disclosed in the impact statement. As part of the assessment, according to the Project Company, public consultations were carried out with "officials and institutions, people affected by the project and non-governmental organizations". According to critics, these consultations have been minimal. Most importantly, the assessment was only completed in July 2008, nearly two years after construction began, in violation of Ethiopian law and in contrast to global good practice of environmental assessments. Also, an independent environmental advisory panel has been established only as late as July 2009, apparently in a belated effort to appease criticism of the project.

==== Alternative environmental impact statement ====
The Africa Resources Working Group (ARWG), a collaborative of eight consultants from around the world, conducted an independent environmental impact statement of their own for the Gibe III dam. The alternative impact statement was performed because of the alleged corruption and inaccuracy of the official impact assessment. The ARWG criticizes many of the statements made in the official Gibe III ESIA. Regarding the flow of water into Lake Turkana, they state that the Gibe III dam will result in a 57-60% decrease of river flow volume. The ARWG also notes that it is not necessarily the volume of water that is important to the Omo River and Turkana ecosystems, but that the seasonality and timing of the water flow is crucial, because certain biota are adapted to feeding, reproducing, growing, etc. in response to seasonal changes in water flow. Artificially releasing water from the Gibe III dam into the Omo River will not be sufficient to meet the needs of these biota. Additionally, the ARWG states that there is "no precedent of successful and sustained implementation" of an artificial flood simulation program in sub-Saharan Africa, so it is not guaranteed that such a program will be maintained at the Gibe III dam.

== Award of construction contract ==
The contract for the construction of the dam was awarded in 2006 to Salini Costruttori of Italy. The engineering design was awarded to Studio Pietrangeli and supervision of ELC-COB (ELC Electroconsult, Italy - Coyne et Bellier, France) as representative of the Ethiopian Electric Power Corporation. The contract to Salini Construttori was awarded after direct negotiation rather than allowing bidding on the contract from other qualified companies. Public international financial institutions require competitive bidding of construction contracts, making it difficult for the Ethiopian government to get a loan from them. The bypassing of the standard process was defended by general manager of the Ethiopian Electric Power Corporation, Mihert Debeba, as skipping a set of "luxurious preconditions" that Ethiopia could not meet, one which would completely halt any development of hydroelectric power.In 2010, a construction contract was signed with a Chinese hydropower company Dongfang Electric Machinery Corporation, a Chinese state-owned company, who completed the work.

== Costs and financing ==
The financial costs of the dam and hydroelectric power plant were estimated to be 1.55 billion Euro. The cost of a transmission line from the power plant to the nearby Wolayta Sodo Substation was estimated at 35 million Euro. These costs do not include the costs of constructing or upgrading power transmission lines to Addis Abeba and onwards to Djibouti to the Northeast of the dam, to Sudan in the West and to Kenya in the South, all located at a distance between 500 and 1000 km from the dam. The cost estimate does not include the costs of extending the electricity distribution network to effectively increase access to electricity. As of 2009, electricity access in the prospective beneficiary countries was still low at 16% in Kenya and 36% in Sudan.

According to the official website of Gibe III, most of the construction cost of the dam itself was financed by the Ethiopian government with its own funds. However, part of the project is financed through a corporate bond called "Millennium Bond" issued by the Ethiopian Electric Power Corporation (EEPCO) and marketed with the Ethiopian diaspora. The Ethiopian government also requested financing of US$250 million from the Italian government for civil works. In 2008, JPMorgan Chase and the Italian export credit agency SACE refused to provide financing.

In May 2010 EEPCo and Dongfang Electric Machinery Corporation, a Chinese state-owned company, signed a memorandum of understanding to provide electrical and mechanical equipment for the project. The agreement is backed by a loan from the Industrial and Commercial Bank of China reportedly covering 85% of the US$495 million cost. International environmental groups have criticized the loan as "hypocritical" and a violation of ICBC's commitment to China's Green Credit Policy. Previously the European Investment Bank (EIB) had been considering financing of the dam's electrical and mechanical equipment with a loan of US$341 million. It has financed economic, financial and technical studies for the dam. In July 2010 the EIB stopped financing environmental and social studies for the dam, stating that "alternative financing" had been found. The African Development Bank had also been considering a US$250 million loan for the electro-mechanical equipment of the plant. The World Bank also had considered funding the project. In 2008 the World Bank decided not to pursue a full feasibility study for the dam, because of the absence of competitive bidding for the prime contractor.

The Exim Bank of China financed the transmission line to the Addis Ababa. The contract was awarded to the Chinese Company Tebian Electric Apparatus Stock Co., Ltd. (TBEA) on July 24, 2009.

In July 2012 the World Bank approved a US$684 million loan for an Eastern Electricity Highway Project that will finance a 500 Kilovolt High Voltage Direct Current transmission line between the Wolayta/Sodo substation in Ethiopia and the Suswa substation in Kenya. Environmental groups have criticized the loan as funding for the Gilgel Gibe III Dam through the backdoor.

== Gilgel Gibe IV dam ==
A $1.9 billion deal between China's Sino Hydro Corporation and the Ethiopian Electric Power Authority to construct the Gibe IV and Halele Werabesa hydroelectric dams was reported by The Shanghai Daily on 15 July 2009. Both dams are "expected to be completed in five years", and would have a combined capacity of over 2,000 megawatts.

== See also ==
- Energy in Ethiopia
- Dams and reservoirs in Ethiopia
- List of power stations in Ethiopia
- Water in Ethiopia
- Water conflict between Ethiopia and Kenya
- The "white oil" of Ethiopia
- Africa Resources Working Group Commentary on Gibe III Dam
- The dam that divides Ethiopians March 2009 BBC News report
