= Tekezé Dam =

Tekeze Dam
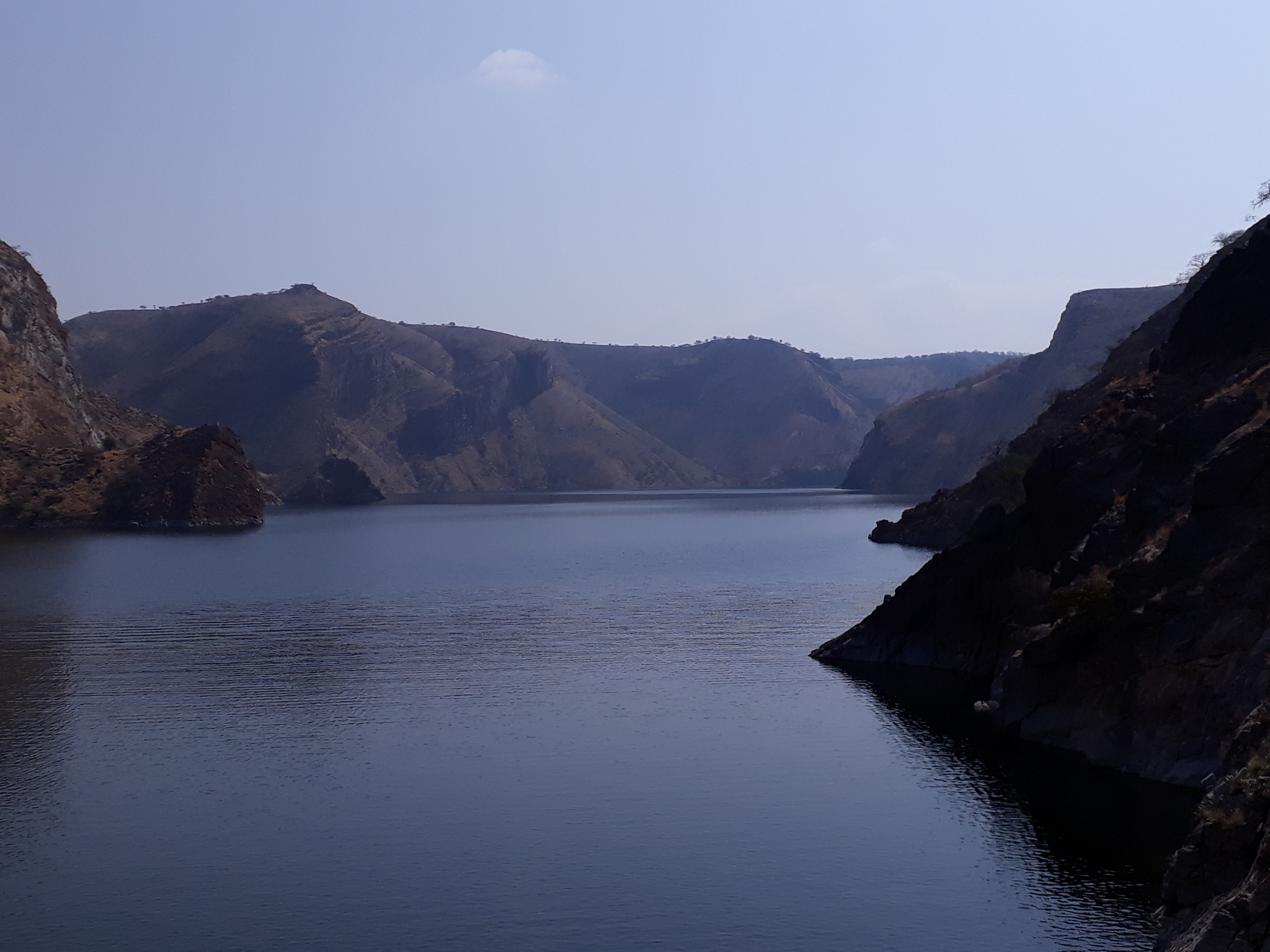
- Tekeze Reservoir, seen from the dam

- Location within Ethiopia
- Official name: Tekeze Dam
- Country: Ethiopia
- Location: Tigray Region, Ethiopia
- Coordinates: 13°20′49″N 38°44′37″E
- Status: Operational
- Construction began: 1999
- Opening date: February 2009
- Construction cost: $360 million
- Owner: Ethiopian Electric Power

Dam and spillways
- Type of dam: Arch dam
- Impounds: Tekeze River
- Height: 607 ft (185 m)
- Length: 2,329 ft (710 m)

Reservoir
- Total capacity: 9.293 km^{3} (7,534,000 acre⋅ft)

Power Station
- Turbines: 4 x 75 MW (101,000 hp)
- Installed capacity: 300 MW (400,000 hp)

Tekezé Dam is a double-curvature arch dam located between Amhara and Tigray regions of Ethiopia. It is situated on the Tekezé River, a tributary of the Nile that flows through one of the deepest canyons in the world.

== Overview ==
CWGS was contracted to build the Tekezé Dam. The hydroelectric project was completed in February 2009. Its final cost was $360 million, which was $136 million over budget. The dam was Ethiopia's largest public works project. The dam helped to reduce power shortages as Ethiopia's power demand increases.

At the time of its completion, the 188 metres (617 ft) Tekezé Dam was Africa's largest double-curvature arch dam. The resulting reservoir is 105 km^{2} large and it has a capacity of 9.3 billion m^{3} of water.

== Tekeze Power Station ==
The powerhouse contains four 75 MW (101,000 hp) turbines, generating 300 MW (400,000 hp) of electricity. A 105 kilometres (65 mi) transmission line connects it to the national grid at Mekelle.

== See also ==
- Energy in Ethiopia
- List of power stations in Ethiopia
- Water politics in the Nile Basin
