= Melka Wakena Hydroelectric Power Station =

Hydroelectric power plant in southern Ethiopia

Melka Wakena Power Station
- Country: Ethiopia
- Location: Ethiopia
- Coordinates: 7°10′22″N 39°26′10″E
- Status: Operational
- Owner: Ethiopian Electric Power

Thermal power station
- Primary fuel: Hydropower

Power generation
- Nameplate capacity: 153 MW (205,000 hp)

The Melka Wakena Power Station is a hydroelectric power plant of the Wabe Shebelle River in Ethiopia. Located in Oromia, the station has a power generating capacity of 153 megawatts (205,000 hp), enough to power over 100,300 homes. The Melka Wakena Power Station was built in 1988 over an active archeological site.

== See also ==
- Energy in Ethiopia
