= Fincha Hydroelectric Power Station =

Hydroelectric power station in Ethiopia

Fincha Power Station
- Country: Ethiopia
- Location: Ethiopia
- Coordinates: 9.5583°N 37.3660°E
- Status: Operational
- Owner: Ethiopian Electric Power

Thermal power station
- Primary fuel: Hydropower

Power generation
- Nameplate capacity: 100 MW (130,000 hp)

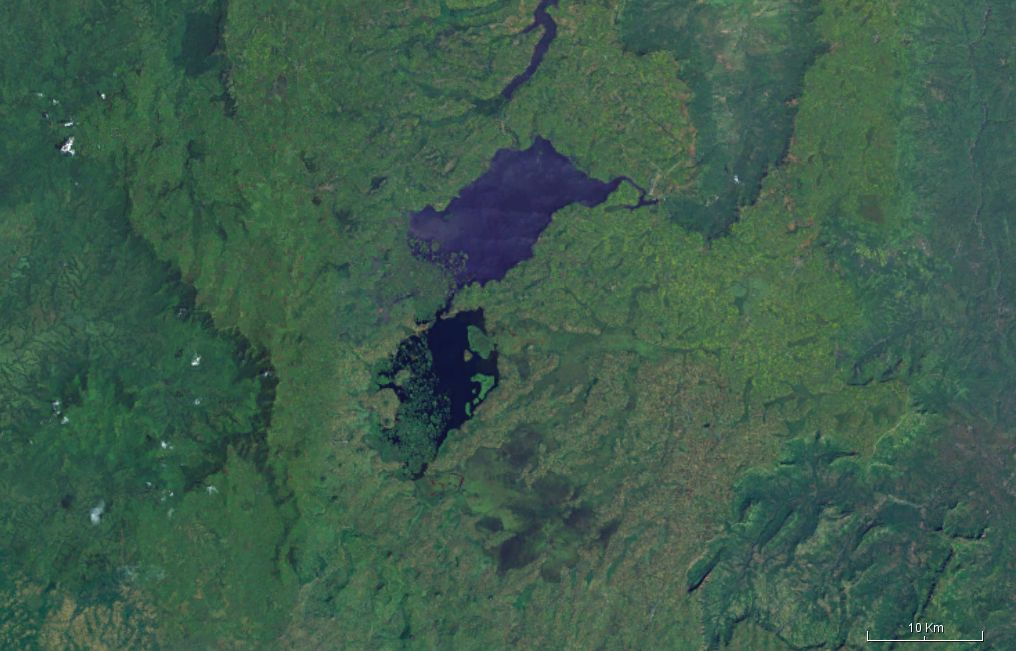
Fincha Amerti Neshe Hydro Power Plant

The Fincha Power Station is a hydroelectric power plant fed through Chomen Lake and discharging into the Fincha River in Ethiopia near the town of Fincha in western Oromia. It has a power generating capacity of 100 megawatts (130,000 hp), enough wattage to power over 66,900 homes.

== See also ==
- Energy in Ethiopia
