= Glenn Switkes =

American environmentalist and filmmaker

Glenn Ross Switkes (1951 – December 21, 2009) was an American environmentalist and film-maker.

== Film career ==
Switkes studied history at Columbia University and filmmaking at the University of California, Berkeley. While finishing his degree in filmmaking, Glenn co-produced with Randy Hayes and Toby McLeod the award-winning Four Corners: A National Sacrifice Area? about the effect of mining on the people and land of the southwestern United States. After visiting the Amazon, he and his first wife Monti Aguirre made a documentary film: Amazonia: Voices of the Rainforest.

== Environmental activism career ==
After completing Amazonia: Voices of the Rainforest, Switkes joined Rainforest Action Network as its Western Amazon oil campaigner. In 1994 he joined International Rivers and moved to Brazil with his second wife, Selma Barros de Oliveira.

== Personal life ==
Glenn Switkes was born in New York City to working class parents and had one brother, Daniel. With his second wife, Selma, he had one son, Gabriel (Gabo). He was a lifelong fan of the New York Yankees and the music of the Grateful Dead and Bob Dylan.

== Death ==
Switkes was diagnosed with lung cancer in December 2009 and died 10 days later. At the time he was serving as Amazon Program Director of the Berkeley, California–based International Rivers (formerly known as International Rivers Network, or IRN).
