= Tendaho Dam =

Dam in Afar, Ethiopia

Tendaho Irrigation Dam
- Location within Ethiopia
- Country: Ethiopia
- Location: Afar, Northern Ethiopia
- Coordinates: 11.6913°N 40.9546°E
- Status: Operational
- Construction began: 2005
- Opening date: 2014
- Owner: Ethiopia

Dam and spillways
- Type of dam: Embankment, earth-fill
- Impounds: Awash River
- Height: 53 m (174 ft)
- Length: 412 m (1,352 ft)

Reservoir
- Total capacity: .186 km^{3} (150,793 acre⋅ft)

Power Station
- Operator: Ethiopian Construction Works Corporation

Tendaho Dam is an earth-filled dam in the eastern Afar Region of Ethiopia. It is situated on the Awash River, and its reservoir also receives the output of the Mille River. The dam is a project of the Ethiopian Water Works Construction Enterprise (EWWCE). Project planning began in 2005, with construction occurring from 2010 to 2014. The dam is aimed at providing irrigation primarily for the Tendaho Sugar Factory sugar cane plantation., as well as drinking water for the region. Out of the 60,000 hectares of land planned to be irrigated, 10,000 would be allotted for social services and the community, and the remaining 50,000 hectares for cultivating sugar cane for the sugar factory.

The nearest towns are Logiya, situated just north of the dam, and Semera, which has an airstrip (Semera Airport) and a university.
