= Energy in Ethiopia =

Energy in Ethiopia includes energy and electricity production, consumption, transport, exportation, and importation in the country of Ethiopia.

Ethiopia's energy sector is crucial for its development, with wood being a primary energy source, leading to deforestation challenges. The country aims to address economic development and poverty by transitioning to alternative sources, particularly electricity.

== Overview ==
The following table provides some of the most relevant energy sector numbers for Ethiopia, a developing country. The primary energy sector is by far the most important one in Ethiopia, with mainly wood used for cooking. That together with the population growth in Ethiopia results in issues like deforestation. Ethiopia aims at economic development and removal of poverty and to replace the use of wood by alternatives. This makes the secondary energy sector (with electricity) most relevant for these efforts. Almost all recent developments are taking place in the secondary energy sector, with the construction of mainly hydropower plants and power transmission lines being most visible.

Energy in Ethiopia
		Primary energy (PE)				Secondary energy (SE)			
	Population	TPES	PE per person	PE production	PE from imports	SE from imports	Electricity generation (EG)	EG/TPES*100	CO_{2}-emission
	Million	TWh	MWh	TWh	TWh	TWh	TWh	%	Mt
2004	74.5	418	5.6	400	0	16.4	2.54	0.61	4.8
2007	80.9	456	5.6	435	0	23.3	3.55	0.78	5.39
2010	87.6	496	5.7	473	0.2	26.0	4.98	1.00	5.96
2013	94.6	546	5.8	515	2.1	34.0	8.72	1.60	8.50
2014	97.0	563	5.8	529	2.3	37.3	9.62	1.71	9.13
Change 2004–2013	27%	31%	3.5%	29%	—	107%	243%	180%	77%
Mtoe (as provided by the IEA) = 11.63 TWh; TPES (Total Primary Energy Supply) includes energy losses; PE production is the produced PE without losses; PE imports does not necessarily mean that their energy is released (imports can also be converted into engineering materials or into energy carriers).

- PE: Ethiopia did not export PE in the years shown.
- PE: all PE imports were bituminous materials (natural asphalt used as engineering material for the construction of roads).
- SE: Ethiopia did export electricity, a single-digit percentage of the generated electricity, the annual amount is not shown in the table.
- SE: SE imports are refined oil products only.
- SE: In 2014, SE imports were mainly gasoline (2.7 TWh), kerosene (8,7 TWh) and diesel (20.1 TWh).

== Primary energy sector ==
Primary energy is produced through the consumption of natural resources, renewable and nonrenewable.

=== Primary energy use ===
All imported primary energy sources are natural asphalt. That material is exclusively used for roads construction but is not used to produce primary energy (heat/enthalpy).

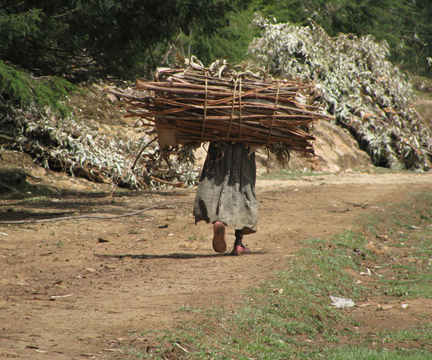
Wood collection for cooking

Therefore, Ethiopia produces its primary energy exclusively from inland resources. These inland resources are almost entirely traditional renewables from biomass and biofuels (like wood) and wastes. A common type of renewable biofuel is wood for heating or cooking in households, a type of resource, that is increasingly overused and overconsumed due to the Ethiopian population growth. Current natural reproduction of wood does not cover the annual use of 37 million tonnes of wood, 50% of the Ethiopian wood reserves of 1,120 million tonnes are exploited. Consequently, deforestation is a common problem in Ethiopia with all of its negative implications. Due to the population growth, energy demand is increasing, which is increasingly (due to the stressed primary energy sources) covered by secondary energy imports, see the table.

Nevertheless, the use of primary energy is also increasing. In part this is due to a more efficient use of agricultural wastes. Ethiopia has agricultural wastes "reserves" of 38 million tonnes per annum, but in 2011 only 6 million tonnes of them were used. This changes now. Such wastes can be used in households or in industrial processes, for example in thermal processing.

Beyond the renewables, Ethiopia also has resources of nonrenewable primary energies (oil, natural gas, coal), but it does not exploit them. It also does not export them.

=== Energy reserves ===
==== Solid and liquid fuels ====
Ethiopia currently relies much on its reserves of wood for energy generation, see the table. Ethiopia in 2013 had 1,120 million tonnes of exploitable wood reserves.

Ethiopia also has liquid and solid hydrocarbon reserves (fossil fuels): oil by 253 million tonnes of oil shales and more than 300 million tonnes of coal. There are no plans in Ethiopia to exploit them and to use them for energy generation. The last time there were plans, in 2006, a 100 MW coal power plant (the Yayu coal power plant) with a nearby coal mine was under consideration. Due to severe environmental concerns all plans were stopped and cancelled in September 2006. The expected environmental destruction was considered to be way too severe.

==== Coal ====
While coal reserves in Ethiopia are estimated to be at 300 million tons nationally. 2020/2021 production reached 500,000 tons. Additionally, the country spends $200 million annually to import 670,000 tons, mainly from South Africa. Cement, textile, marble and ceramic factories are among the largest users of coal. There are ongoing plans to improve the coal calorific value and to increase production, aiming at substituting this import with the locally mined product.

==== Natural gas ====
Natural gas makes up the most exploitable form of hydrocarbon reserves: a total of 4.1 trillion cubic feet (1.2×10^{11} m^{3}) of natural gas reserves were found in two gas field in Ethiopia's Ogaden basin, the Calub and Hilala gas fields. All the gas will be exported to China, production wells are under construction in 2017. The two gas fields should be in production by 2019. Initial plans are to pump out 4 billion m^{3} per year.

=== Transport of primary energy sources ===
==== Road transport ====
The currently used biomass / biofuels for primary energy production in most cases do not need to be transported over more than local distances. This can be done by simple roads. The reason is simple: Ethiopia was (and still is to some extent) a subsistence economy, where the vast majority of goods is produced and consumed locally within a few kilometers around the home of people.

==== Pipelines ====
A pipeline will be built to transport natural gas from the Calub and Hilala gas fields to a LNG terminal in the Port of Djibouti. This pipeline will be around 800 km in length and should be in operation by 2020. It will be a pipeline for 4 billion m^{3} per year. There are also low-priority plans to connect the triangle Kenya, South Sudan and Ethiopia through crude oil pipelines as part of the Kenyan LAPSSET-corridor.

== Secondary energy sector ==
=== Overview ===
Secondary energy is produced by the consumption of secondary energy sources, more often called energy carriers. It is official policy worldwide and also in Ethiopia to replace primary energy through secondary energy and energy carriers are the vehicles to store this secondary energy. By doing so, the need to use primary energy for energy production in daily life will be replaced by the need to use energy carriers for energy production. This will relieve some pressure from the sources of primary energy in Ethiopia (wood, forests) and will also prevent the country from using its own domestic and nonrenewable primary energy such as coal and oil shales.

Energy carriers are obtained through a man-made conversion process from primary energy sources. Most suitable for the production of energy carriers are abundant and renewable primary energy sources (like sun, water, wind, etc.) while the use of precious and limited nonrenewable sources like oil is usually avoided as much as possible. A direct use of such abundant renewable primary energy sources (sun, water, etc...) is often not possible in technical processes, so it is more feasible to produce energy carriers to store and to transport energy that can later be consumed as secondary energy.

The three main energy carriers in Ethiopia are refined oil products (diesel, gasoline, kerosene), electricity (from solar radiation, water, wind, heat) and bioethanol (from sugarcane). Bioethanol wasn't produced in substantial quantities until very recently, it makes up 0.4 TWh annually (2017). Electricity is about to replace diesel as the main energy carrier in Ethiopia – but taken all refined oil products altogether (38.5 TWh in 2014), electricity (22.5 TWh in 2016) will still take a few years before it will surpass oil products as main energy carrier. Both the amount of imported refined oil products and the produced electricity are increasing—but the growth rate for electricity is much higher than that for refined oil products. See the table. For a developing country it is usually the other way round.

=== Refined oil products ===
Diesel fuel is the main refined oil product in Ethiopia. It has a share of 20.1 TWh on the total of 37.3 TWh for refined oil products. Diesel is used for thermal power plants (oil power plant) and for private and public diesel generators in parts of the country, where electrical power from the national grid is an issue. Diesel fuel is the main fuel for trucking. As Ethiopia is leaving the state of a subsistence economy, the demand for the transportation of goods is quickly increasing. In 2017, there is no operational railway in Ethiopia, so the transportation of goods needs trucks and roads. Gasoline, to be used in cars, is only 13% (2.7 TWh) of the value for diesel.

More important than gasoline but not as important as diesel is kerosene with 8.8 TWh. 3.1 TWh of kerosene is used for lighting, as electricity is not everywhere in Ethiopia. The remaining 5.7 TWh of kerosene is used for jet flights by Ethiopian Airlines, the state carrier of Ethiopia. Ethiopian Airlines is maybe the most successful state owned enterprise in Ethiopia, the largest and most successful airline Africas and also the airline with the largest cargo fleet in Africa in 2017. It is the cargo, that is of particular interest for Ethiopia. In recent years, flowers and horticulture products – which require air transport – quickly became one of the main export products of Ethiopia, to Europe and to China in particular.

=== Bioethanol ===
Bioethanol is produced in currently ~6 sugar factories in Ethiopia (planned are 12 with bioethanol production facilities in 2020), where sugarcane is converted into sugar and the remaining sugar molasses into bioethanol. The ethanol fuel energy balance from sugarcane molasses can be considered to be favorable. In addition, by using the output from existing cogeneration modules as part of the sugar production processes in Ethiopia, the bioethanol production does not require extra energy, which makes the bioethanol production even more favorable.

In 2017, the annual bioethanol production capacity was at 103,000 m^{3}. Together with planned capacities, the total production capacity in 2020 would amount to almost 300,000m^{3} per annum. Compared to the bioethanol world production in 2016, the existing bioethanol production makes up only 0.1% of the worldwide bioethanol production. For a poor and developing country like Ethiopia this is still a significant and valuable amount. Ethiopia itself uses its bioethanol to blend gasoline (ethanol is much cheaper than gasoline) and for cooking stoves. The produced amount of bioethanol is considered as energy carrier worth 400 GWh of secondary energy per annum. This is sufficient to blend all the imported motor gasoline to become gasohol/E10, which is mandatory in Ethiopia.

After blending the gasoline, around 60–70 % of the ethanol is left over, this fuel goes into modern cook stoves as is provided to Ethiopia through Project Gaia. These cook stoves are burning fuel more efficiently, do not require wood as fuel and are thought to help protecting the forests of Ethiopia and to prevent deforestation.

=== Electricity ===
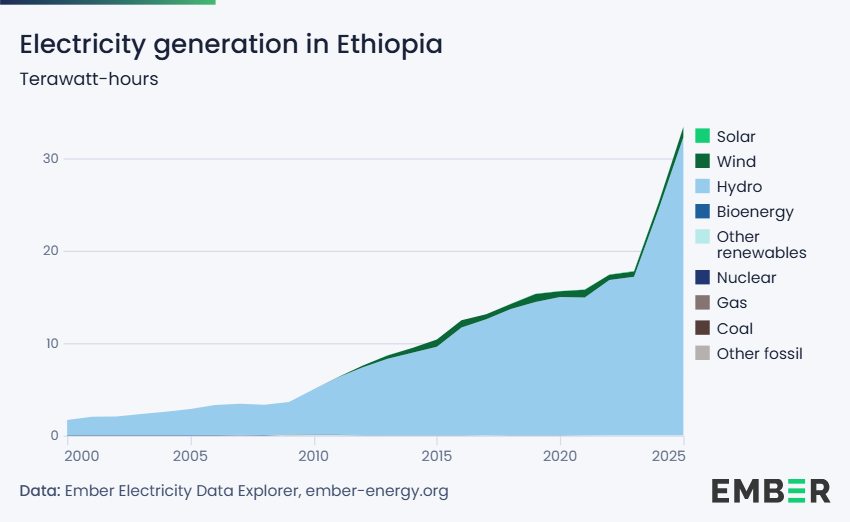
Electricity generation in Ethiopia in terawatt-hours

==== Electricity production potential ====
The country focuses on the production of electricity from a mix of cheap and clean renewable primary energy sources like hydropower or wind power. Ethiopia has a total identified economically feasible potential of 45 GW of hydropower and 1,350 GW of wind power. The identified economically feasible potential from photovoltaics amounts to 5.2 GW while that from geothermal energies amounts to ~7 GW. Ethiopia plans to exploit these resources.

Assuming an average capacity factor of 0.4, that would mean a total electricity production potential of around 4,900 TWh, about 9 times the total primary energy the country did consume in 2014. The country could replace most of its primary energy use through the use of electricity. More than that, the country could become a major exporter of electricity. It is an expressed wish of the Ethiopian government to become an exporter of renewable energies in the future.

In 2014, the country had an annual electricity production of 9,5 TWh. With this, Ethiopia was at position 101 and with an installed electricity generation capacity of 2.4 GW at the position 104 worldwide according to the CIA. In July 2017, the so-called nameplatepower capacity, the overall installed power capacity, was up to 4,267.5 MW. 97.4% of that were from renewable primary energies like water and wind, with electricity from hydropower plants dominating with 89.7% and wind power with 7.6%. The completion of Gilgel Gibe III in 2015/16 added another 1870 MW capacity to the country's power production, more than doubling the country's production capacity from the year before.

In 2010, electricity production made up only ~1 % of Ethiopia's primary energy. Between 2010 and 2016, the production of electricity went up from around ~5 TWh to around ~22 TWh (around 4% of the primary energy value). This was due to an ambitious program to build wind farms and hydropower plants to produce electricity. By looking at the table above, the annual production of energy carriers (electricity) within Ethiopia is growing faster than the growing need for primary energy. But the need for primary energy is still increasing in Ethiopia, even on a per person base. So, while energy carriers are increasingly produced, the general availability of them is not given to an extent that would allow the reduction of the use of primary energy. Also, imports of refined oil products are increasing, which cannot be avoided for a developing country (the transport of goods becomes much more important than for a subsistence economy).

Transport of electricity is done through electricity containers, such as power transmission lines and batteries. Especially the availability of a network of power transmission lines, a power grid, defines the amount of availability of electricity as the major source for secondary energy. Of course also in the case of Ethiopia. This is given through the degree of electrification. A higher electrification means an increasing demand for electricity.

In Ethiopia, the total demand for electrical power is increasing by ~30 % annually. There is a race between available power generation capacities and the electrification and availability of electricity. In 2016 and 2017, while plenty of electricity was available through the addition of the new Gilgel Gibe III power plant to the national power grid, substations and power transmission lines were running out of capacity, with frequent outages and shortages which resulted in a wave of additions of substations and power transmission lines.

==== Electricity generation ====
In contrast to the primary energy sector, many sources of energy for the secondary energy sector are present both as renewable energies and in an abundant form. In total, Ethiopia has very good conditions for generating electricity through hydropower, wind power and geothermal power, all of them characterized by a very low CO_{2}-emission. The levelized cost of electricity in recent years became somewhat favorable for these clean ways to generate electricity.

Constructing power stations is of high priority in Ethiopian politics. The country is permanently increasing its number of power stations with an increasing number in operation and under construction. The number of power stations in the planning stage is even larger. Ethiopia fully focuses on renewable energies, mainly from hydropower and wind power, to increase its installed electricity production capacity.

===== Hydropower =====
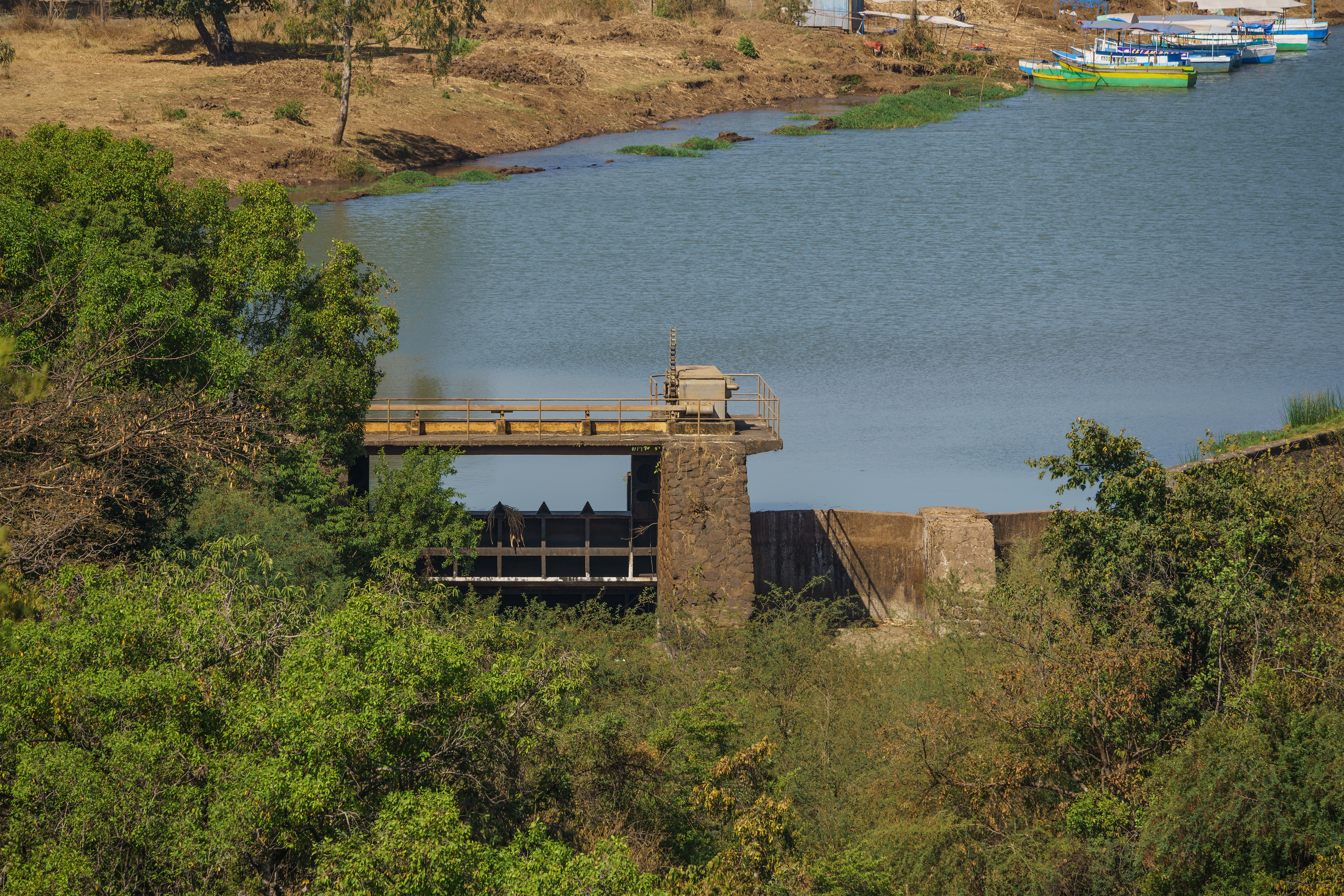
Hydroelectric power plant near the Blue Nile Falls

The levelized cost of electricity is often considered to be lowest for hydropower if compared to other possible types of electricity generation. In addition, hydropower is by far the most favorable way of producing electricity when looking at the energy returned on energy invested. This makes hydropower a favorable source of energy.

On the other hand, Ethiopia is often affected by droughts. Ethiopia is one of the most-drought prone countries in the world. Hydropower projects (dams) help set up irrigation projects in certain parts of Ethiopia while buffering the impact of droughts. It is official policy to fully utilize hydropower in Ethiopia in combination with irrigation, so the double-positive effect of getting both cheap energy and sufficient water explains the focus on hydropower projects.

Ethiopia in 2013 assumed a total economically feasible potential of 45 GW of hydropower. For a decent capacity factor of 0.4, one could expect an electrical energy generation of 158 TWh per annum in case of full exploitation of the feasible potential, which fits the expected numbers put forward by the Ethiopian Ministry of Water and Energy. 8.5% of the 45 GW of assumed hydrowoper potential of Ethiopia was exploited in 2017, the additional irrigation area gained through these hydropower installations is unknown outside Ethiopia.

Only 28% of the installed power is located in river basins (Atbara, Blue Nile, Sobat River) discharging into the River Nile, while the same basins contribute 64% to the economically feasible hydropower potential of 45 GW. One of the reasons for this imbalance is water politics in the Nile Basin. Ethiopia delivers roughly 81% of water volume to the Nile through the river basins of the Blue Nile, Sobat River and Atbara. In 1959, Egypt and Sudan signed a bilateral treaty, the 1959 Nile Waters Agreement, which gave both countries exclusive maritime rights over the Nile waters. Ever since, Egypt under international law vetoed almost all projects in Ethiopia that sought to utilize the local Nile tributaries. This had the effect of discouraging external financing of hydropower and irrigation projects in western Ethiopia, thereby impeding water resource-based economic development projects. External financing for hydropower projects in other Ethiopian river basins was easier to get.

One example for this discouraging effect is the Chemoga Yeda-project, that, according to Ethiopian voices, was considered to affect less than 1% of the water system of the Blue Nile. This project in 2011 had secured external financing and was considered under construction already, when it received an Egyptian veto under international law. The project lost its financing. In 2015, another attempt was started to finance the project, the outcome has not been reported to the media. In 2011, another project was started in the Blue Nile basin, the Grand Ethiopian Renaissance Dam (GERD). This project was also vetoed by Egypt, but Ethiopia this time made it a national project and started the project without external financing (except from the Ethiopian Diaspora). GERD will add 6.45 GW of installed power but comes without irrigation. Nonetheless, in 2013 Egypt issued harsh statements just short of war threatening, seeing the River Nile as its sole lifeline in danger. The Blue Nile River supplies 85% of the water entering Egypt.

The large Gilgel Gibe III hydroelectric project, after commissioning in 2016, more than doubled Ethiopias installed electricity generation capabilities and is one of the largest hydropower projects in Africa. It lies outside the River Nile basin and did not face vetoes by Egypt. Some scientists said that the project could reduce the flow of the Omo River, kill ecosystems, and reduce the water level of Lake Turkana. Critics warned that the people along the banks of the Omo River could be heavily affected and Lake Turkana, the terminus of the Omo River and its endorheic basin would become a saline lake and finally dry up. The risk of earthquakes at the dam site (magnitudes of up to 8) was also highlighted. The dam became fully operational in 2017, and it needs to be seen whether or not the predictions become reality.

===== Wind power =====
The Ethiopian government increasingly focuses on wind power. In contrast to hydropower projects, which re-allocate water resources to some extent, only locals feel negatively impacted by wind farms to some extent. The levelized cost of electricity from wind power worldwide is falling and is now (2017) roughly that of hydropower. It is expected to fall further due to maturing technologies, increasing wind power popularity and more suitable sites where wind power plants can be installed when compared to hydropower. By taking these developments into account, the Ethiopian Ministry of Water and Energy revised its numbers on an economically feasible wind power potential within only a few years from 10 GW to 1,350 GW.

Wind power is ideally suited to complement hydro power. Oversimplified is wind power available in Ethiopia in times of water shortages, while abundant water is present when no wind is blowing. During the Ethiopian dry seasons, steady trade winds are blowing all over the country while it is dry. During the summer wet season, the wet monsoon dominates in Western Ethiopia with plenty of water available, while winds are rather weak over most of Ethiopia.

Almost 80% of the identified favorable sites for wind power development are within the Somali Region of Ethiopia, most of it which would require long transmission lines to the Ethiopian cities. The remaining ~300 GW are more evenly distributed across Ethiopia (1,000 TWh per annum for a capacity factor of 0.4). This potential is still much bigger than that from hydropower.

===== Solar energy =====
Predicted by Swanson's law, the levelized costs for photovoltaics have plunged to levels just above that of hydropower and wind power. Ethiopia aims to diversify its electricity generation capabilities by investing into an energy mix, of which photovoltaics will be a part.

There are excellent conditions to use solar energy in Ethiopia, in particular in Tigray Region and on the eastern and western rims of the Ethiopian Highlands (roughly 2% of Ethiopia's area). These areas have an annual solar irradiation of 2,200 kWh/(m^{2}•annum) or more; with around 20% cell efficiency this results in a solar energy generation potential of ~450 GWh/(km^{2}•annum). A solar-cell-covered area of 1,000 km^{2} (390 sq mi) (around 0.1% of Ethiopia's area) could generate 450 TWh annually. As of 2017 Ethiopia seeks the installation of 5.2 GW from photovoltaic power stations. With a capacity factor of 20%, an annual power generation of 9.1 TWh might be expected from the sum of all proposed photovoltaics power stations. 300 MW of photovoltaic installations are planned to be developed by 2020. The 100 MW Metehara PV power station was tendered in 2017.

Solar thermal energy does not play any role in Ethiopia's energy mix considerations. The expected levelized costs of solar thermal installations is quite high. A possible exception is to make use of cogeneration, like the use of solar pond technologies for salt ponds at sites like Dallol, where in 2017 a potash project is under development.

===== Geothermal energy =====
Possibly exploitable are around 1,000 GW–7,000 GW from geothermal energy, as the East African Rift runs through Ethiopia with a number of hot spots for energy generation from geothermal energy. It is planned to develop 570 MW of geothermal energy at two different sites within the Great Rift Valley, Ethiopia. Given a capacity factor of 0.8 that would make 4 TWh annually.

In exploiting geothermal energies, Ethiopia is piloting a way that was previously unknown to this country in the energy sector (which is otherwise entirely owned by the state): foreign direct investments with a full private ownership of power plants for 25 years with a power purchase agreement in place with a guaranteed price of US ¢7.53/kWh for the enterprise developing the Corbetti thermal site. This site alone is expected to generate 500 MW of the planned 570 MW.

===== Cogeneration =====
By using cogeneration, up to ten sugar plants with attached thermal power plants are planned or under construction in 2017, using bagasse as fuel. Expected is an installed capacity of between 200 and 300 MW. Two thirds would be used for sugar production while the remaining third could be delivered to the national grid. If one assumes a decent capacity factor of 0.8 (typical value for thermal power plants), there might be indeed some excess electricity added to the national grid. The generated energy will not add much to the national grid but it will prevent the sugar factories from becoming net consumers of electricity.

===== Other thermal power stations =====
Besides the cogeneration facilities, a single waste-to-energy project (renewable energy) is running in Ethiopia. Also a number of diesel power plants exist (nonrenewable fuel) to make electric power available, when no generation capacities from renewable and abundant energy sources are available for some reason.

=== Transport of energy carriers ===
Electricity, refined oil products and bioethanol transport and distribution.

==== Power transmission lines and electrification ====
In communities without power and without power transmission lines, is there no electrification? In Ethiopia that is not entirely true. The Ethiopian government bought around 40,000 Home Solar Systems (SHS) and some larger Institutional Solar Systems in China starting around 2014 with a battery storage and a maximum output power of about 50 W per panel under optimum solar irradiation conditions. These systems were distributed to remote rural communities to power school rooms, offices of authorities and households. The SHS operate at a rated voltage of 12 V DC, with a rated current of up to 5 A. LED lamps for lighting come with the SHS. The SHS can provide power for low power DC appliances such as lights, radios for about three to five hours a day. Until 2020, around 150.000 SHS should be bought.

This distribution of SHS was deemed necessary, as only 56% of Ethiopias population had access to the electric grid in 2017. Most of the 35% rural population of Ethiopia is not connected to the grid. Also affected by off-grid conditions in 2017 is a substantial part of the urban population.

That does not necessarily mean, that the urban population with nominal access to the electric grid was better off. Due to a quickly increasing demand of electric power of ~30 % per annum it came to a lot of power outages in 2016 and 2017, there was a lack of grid stability. In particular most of the existing substations were running above their nominal capacity, while the capacity of standard voltage transmission lines (the last mile) was exceeded, too. Urban households were experiencing frequent outages lasting over days. Companies on the other hand were affected by energy rationing. To work around these outages, shortages and the rationing, some companies started to build their own substations to become independent from the public ones after which they enjoyed a more stable access to the grid with a higher allowed energy consumption. As a consequence of the shortages, Ethiopia in 2017 and 2018 invested a lot in new substations and standard voltage transmission lines with the promise, that at least the main urban centers and industrial parks would see a more stable electricity supply in 2018.

The least concern is given for the backbone of the electric grid. Ethiopia steadily invests in high voltage transmission lines (130 kV ac, 230 kV ac; 400 kV ac). For large energy exports to the wider East African area, Ethiopia and Kenya are now building a 500 kV HVDC line over 1045 km length, that is expected to carry 2 GW. In the long term, Ethiopia eyes HVDC lines to Egypt and to Europe.

==== Roads and rail ====
There is a strongly growing need for refined oil imports (diesel, gasoline and kerosene) to the Ethiopian metropolitan areas (SE imports, see the table above). This demand was covered in 2016 and 2017 by ~500 tank trucks daily leaving the Port of Djibouti towards Ethiopia. Plans to substitute the truck transport by 110 tank waggons on the newly built Addis Ababa–Djibouti Railway didn't arrive in reality in 2017. Also transported by road is bioethanol. The bioethanol production plants have road access but are usually located in remote areas so that tank trucks need to be used.

==== Pipelines ====
A multi-fuel pipeline is currently (2017) being built until 2019 over 500 km–600 km from Djibouti to Central Ethiopia (Awash), where a storage facility exists. This multi-fuel Horn of Africa Pipeline (HOAP) will transport all sorts of refined oil products.

== See also ==
- List of power stations in Ethiopia
- Deforestation in Ethiopia
- Renewable energy in Ethiopia
- Dams and reservoirs in Ethiopia
- Project Gaia
- Ogaden Basin
