= International Rivers =

US-based nonprofit organization

- Founded: 1985
- Type: Non-Profit
- Purpose: People-Water-Life
- Location: Oakland, California, United States
- Region served: Worldwide
- Method: Advocacy, Education, Research
- Key people: Isabella Winkler and Josh Klemm, Interim Co-Executive Directors; Melina Selverston, Chair, and Astrid Puentes Riaño, Vice Chair of the Board of Directors
- Revenue: US$1,893,514 (2016)
- Website: www.internationalrivers.org

International Rivers is a nonprofit, nongovernmental, environmental, and human rights organization. Founded in 1985 by social and environmental activists, International Rivers works with policy and financial analysts, scientists, journalists, development specialists, and volunteers to combat the adverse effects of dams and their legacies that it has identified in over 60 countries.

The organization has staff in South Africa, Thailand, Brazil, China, India, and the United States, who have expertise in a range of issues and who use research, education, and advocacy to achieve the organization's mission.

== Overview ==
The organization's stated aims are to protect rivers and defend the rights of communities that depend on them. It actively works against the development model associated with dams, which it believes to be unsustainable, and promotes alternative solutions for meeting water, energy, and flood-management needs. International Rivers is dedicated to giving dam-affected people the tools to participate in the development of local lands in Africa, Asia, and Latin America.

By facilitating international grassroots organizing and informed participation, the organization seeks to change the terms of the debate over river development. The group works with its numerous partners to advocate for social reparations, ecological restoration, and the decommissioning of existing dams. International Rivers works to clarify what it describes as the traditionally top-down decision-making of large infrastructure projects. It also takes a stance against the industry's representation of hydropower as it relates to climate change: The organization maintains that reservoirs often produce greenhouse gas emissions that further impact the environment.

== Programs ==
International Rivers has undertaken a two-pronged approach to analyzing and promoting viable water and energy solutions. Combining its efforts to change global policy by campaigning on specific key projects, the organization simultaneously addresses the root causes and localized consequences of dam development. The organization's campaigns throughout Africa, China, Latin America, South Asia, and Southeast Asia focus on the intersection of dams and climate change, reforming the policies and practices of international financial institutions, and promoting water and energy solutions that recognize human rights and environmental sustainability.

== Contributions ==
Among its accomplishments, International Rivers contributed to the formation of the World Commission on Dams (WCD). The commission was a global, multi-stakeholder body initiated in 1997 by the World Bank and the World Conservation Union in response to growing opposition to dams. During its two-year lifetime, the WCD conducted what is said to be the most exhaustive study of dams completed to date, evaluating over 1,000 dams in 79 countries. In its published final report, the WCD concluded that although "dams have made an important and significant contribution to human development, and benefits derived from them have been considerable ... in too many cases an unacceptable and often unnecessary price has been paid to secure those benefits, especially in social and environmental terms, by people displaced, by communities downstream, by taxpayers, and by the natural environment."

Since the organization's inception, worldwide construction of dams has decreased by half, and universal recognition of the consequences of hydropower continues to increase.

The organization publishes a journal, World Rivers Review, focused on addressing the state of various dam projects, ecosystems, and people. It also publishes an annual report on a variety of dam-related subjects.

== See also ==
- International Water Centre
- Environmental impacts of dams
- Glenn Switkes
