= Water politics in the Nile Basin =

Political interactions between nations

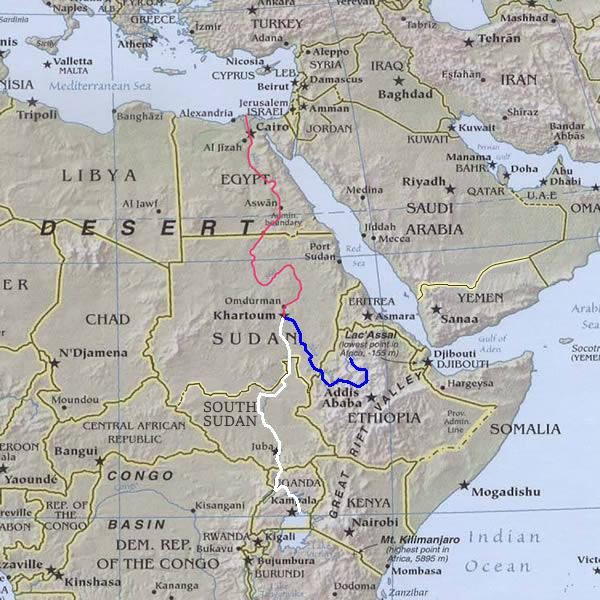
The Nile, its tributaries, and the countries of the region

As a water body that crosses numerous international political borders, the Nile River is subject to multiple disputes about water rights. Traditionally it is seen as the world's longest river flowing 6,700 kilometres (4,200 mi) through ten countries in northeastern Africa – Rwanda, Burundi, Democratic Republic of the Congo (DRC), Tanzania, Kenya, Uganda, Ethiopia, South Sudan, Sudan and Egypt with varying climates.

In terms of basin area of the Nile, Sudan has the largest size (1,900,000 km^{2} (730,000 mi^{2})) whereas, of the four major tributaries to the Nile, three originate from Ethiopia – the Blue Nile, Sobat and Atbara. The modern history of hydropolitics in the Nile Basin is very complex and has had wide ramifications both for regional and global developments.

== Geography ==
The following table demonstrates the water availability in each country within the Nile basin, and researchers' estimates of decrease in water availability to these countries, due largely to an increase in the countries' populations.

| Country | Population 1995 (millions) | Population 2025 (millions) | GNP per capita 1996 (US $) | Population below the poverty line (1US$/day) (PPP) (%) | Per capita water availability 1990 (m³) | Per capita water availability 2025 (m³) |
|---|---|---|---|---|---|---|
| Burundi | 6.4 | 13.5 | 170 | | 655 | 269 |
| DRC | 43.9 | 104.6 | 160 | | 359,803 | 139,309 |
| Egypt | 62.9 | 111.7 | 1,090 | 32.5 | 1,123 | 492 |
| Ethiopia | 55.1 | 126.9 | 100 | 33.8 | 2,207 | 842 |
| Kenya | 28.8 | 63.4 | 320 | 50.2 | 636 | 235 |
| Rwanda | 8 | 15.8 | 190 | 45.7 | 897 | 306 |
| Sudan | 28.1 | 58.4 | | | 4,792 | 1,993 |
| Tanzania | 29.7 | 68.9 | 170 | 16.4 | 2,924 | 1,025 |
| Uganda | 21.3 | 50.6 | 300 | 50 | 3,759 | 1,437 |

Sudan also has hydraulic potential and has created four dams in the last century. This has resulted in the development so far of 18,000 km^{2} (6,900 mi^{2}) of irrigated land, making Sudan the second most extensive user of the Nile, after Egypt.

While Egypt is highly dependent on the Nile, there are factors that may lead to conflict over the distribution of the Nile's water supply. For example, Egypt has such an agriculturally dependent economy. Further, Egypt is already dependent on virtual water imports, a strategy which may lead that country to attempt future water conflicts. Ethiopia's tributaries supply about 86 percent of the waters of the Nile. Over the years, the involved states have put agreements and treaties into place so that conflict can be controlled.

=== Egypt and the Nile ===
Egyptian civilization has sustained itself utilizing water management and agriculture for some 5,000 years in the Nile River valley. The Egyptians practiced basin irrigation, a form of water management adapted to the natural rise and fall of the Nile River. Since around 3000 BCE, the Egyptians constructed earthen banks to form flood basins of various sizes that were regulated by sluices to floodwater into the basin where it would sit until the soil was saturated, the water was then drained, and crops planted. This method of agriculture did not deplete the soil of nutrients or cause salinization problems experienced by modern agricultural methods.

=== Treaties affecting Nile water use ===
==== April 15, 1891 – Article III of the Anglo-Italian Protocol ====
Article III states that "the Italian government engages not to construct on the Atbara River, in view of irrigation, any work which might sensibly modify its flow into the Nile". The language used in this article was too vague to provide clear property rights or rights to the use of water.

==== May 15, 1902 – Article III of the Treaty between Great Britain and Ethiopia ====
Article three of the treaty between Great Britain and Ethiopia has become one of the most contested agreements over the use of the Nile waters. The aim of this treaty was to establish the border between Ethiopia and the Sudan. One of its articles, number III, related to the use of Nile water. The English version, as reviewed by Britain and later by the Sudan, read: "His Majesty the Emperor Menilik II, King of Kings of Ethiopia, engages himself towards the Government of His Britannic Majesty not to construct or allow to be constructed any work across the Blue Nile, Lake Tana, or the Sobat, which would arrest the flow of their waters except in agreement with His Britannic Majesty’s Government and the Government of Sudan." The Amharic version, however, gave a different meaning and understanding to Ethiopia and "was never ratified by this country."

==== May 9, 1906 – Article III of the Agreement between Britain and Congo ====
Article III of the Agreement between Britain and the Government of the Independent State of the Congo states "The Government of the independent state of the Congo undertakes not to construct, or allow to be constructed, any work over or near the Semliki or Isango river which would diminish the volume of water entering Lake Albert except in agreement with the Sudanese Government".

==== December 13, 1906 – Article 4(a) of the Tripartite Treaty ====
Article 4(a) of the Tripartite Treaty (Britain-France-Italy) states “To act together... to safeguard; ... the interests of Great Britain and Egypt in the Nile Basin, more especially as regards the regulation of the waters of that river and its tributaries (due consideration being paid to local interests) without prejudice to Italian interests". This treaty, in effect, denied Ethiopia its sovereign right over the use of its own water. Ethiopia has rejected the treaty their military and political power was not sufficient to regain its use of the Nile water.

==== 1925 Exchange of notes between Britain and Italy ====
The notes concerning Lake Tana state: "...Italy recognizes the prior hydraulic rights of Egypt and the Sudan... not to construct on the head waters of the Blue Nile and the White Nile (the Sobat) and their tributaries and effluents any work which might sensibly modify their flow into the main river." Ethiopia opposed the agreement and notified both parties of its objections:

"To the Italian government: The fact that you have come to an agreement, and the fact that you have thought it necessary to give us a joint notification of that agreement, make it clear that your intention is to exert pressure, and this in our view, at once raises a previous question. This question which calls for preliminary examination, must therefore be laid before the League of Nations."

"To the British government: The British Government has already entered into negotiations with the Ethiopian Government in regard to its proposal, and we had imagined that, whether that proposal was carried into effect or not, the negotiations would have been concluded with us; we would never have suspected that the British Government would come to an agreement with another Government regarding our Lake."

When an explanation was required from the British and the Italian governments by the League of Nations, they denied challenging Ethiopia’s sovereignty over Lake Tana.

==== May 7, 1929 – The Agreement between Egypt and Anglo-Egyptian Sudan ====
This agreement included:

- Egypt and Sudan utilize 48 and 4 billion cubic meters of the Nile flow per year, respectively;
- The flow of the Nile during January 20 to July 15 (dry season) would be reserved for Egypt;
- Egypt reserves the right to monitor the Nile flow in the upstream countries;
- Egypt assumed the right to undertake Nile river related projects without the consent of upper riparian states.
- Egypt assumed the right to veto any construction projects that would affect her interests adversely.

==== 1959 Nile Waters Agreement ====
The Agreement for the Full Utilization of the Nile Waters between Sudan and Egypt established full control utilization of the Nile waters. This agreement included:

- The long standing dispute over the Nile’s average annual flow was resolved, with the volume set at roughly 84 billion cubic meters as measured at the Aswan High Dam in Egypt.
- The agreement provided for the full average annual flow of the Nile to be divided between Sudan and Egypt, assigning 18.5 billion cubic meters to Sudan and 55.5 billion cubic meters to Egypt.
- Annual losses from evaporation and other factors were set at approximately 10 billion cubic meters, with this amount subtracted from the Nile’s total yield before allocations were made to Egypt and Sudan.
- Sudan, in coordination with Egypt, agreed to undertake projects aimed at increasing the Nile’s flow by reducing evaporation losses in the Sudd wetlands along the White Nile in southern Sudan. The costs and benefits of these projects were to be shared equally. Any claims by other Nile riparian states regarding the river’s waters were to be addressed jointly by Sudan and Egypt.
- If the claim were accepted and water from the Nile were to be allocated to an additional riparian state, the agreed amount would be subtracted equally from the shares assigned to Sudan and Egypt, based on volumes measured at Aswan.
- Egypt was authorized to build the Aswan High Dam, capable of storing the Nile River’s full annual flow.
- Sudan was permitted to build the Roseries Dam on the Blue Nile and to pursue additional irrigation and hydroelectric projects in order to make full use of its allocated share of Nile waters.
- A Permanent Joint Technical Commission was envisaged to facilitate technical cooperation between the two countries.

=== Nile Basin Initiative ===
The Nile Basin Initiative (NBI) is a partnership among the Nile Riparian states that “seeks to develop the river in a cooperative manner, share substantial socioeconomic benefits, and promote regional peace and security”. It was formally launched in February 1999 by the water ministers of nine countries that share the river – Egypt, Sudan, Ethiopia, Uganda, Kenya, Tanzania, Burundi, Rwanda and the Democratic Republic of Congo with Eritrea as an observer.

=== International law context ===
- 1966: The Helsinki Rules on the Uses of the Waters of International Rivers – Adopted by the International Law Association at the 52nd conference held in Helsinki in August 1966, the rules govern use of waters of an international drainage basin except as may be provided otherwise by convention, agreement or binding custom among the basin States.
- 1995: Protocol on Shared Watercourse Systems in the Southern African Development Community (SADC) region was signed at Johannesburg, 28 August 1995.
- 1997: Convention on the Law of Non-Navigational Uses of International Watercourses.

=== Effects of treaties and policies on Nile basin water use ===
During the colonial period, Britain effectively controlled the Nile through its military presence in Africa. Since Sudanese independence, Sudan has renegotiated with Egypt over the use of the Nile waters. The 1959 agreement between Sudan and Egypt allocated the entire average annual flow of the Nile to be shared among the Sudan and Egypt at 18.5 and 55.5 billion cubic meters respectively, but ignored the rights to water of the remaining eight Nile countries. Ethiopia contributes 80% of the total Nile flow, but by the 1959 agreement is entitled to none of its resources. However, the agreement between Egypt and Sudan is not binding on Ethiopia as it was never a party to it. Since the early 1990s, Ethiopia has successfully countered Egyptian and Sudanese resistance to water development projects in Ethiopia to increase irrigation and hydroelectric potential. Since May 2010, Ethiopia and the other upper riparian states have launched the Nile Basin Cooperative Framework Agreement in a bid to ensure an equitable utilization between all the riparian states of the Nile.

=== Prospects of cooperation in the Nile Basin ===
Egypt continues to be the primary user of Nile water. According to Swain and Fadel, political instability and poverty in the other nine riparian countries has limited their ability to move toward socioeconomic development of the Nile. According to Lemma, the greatest question facing the Nile riparian states is: Will the Nile Basin Initiative help them overcome the unjust and unequal distribution of Nile water resources?

== Other issues in hydropolitics ==
=== Pollution of the Nile River ===
While most of the river’s water quality is within acceptable levels, there are several hot spots mostly found in the irrigation canals and drainages. Sources of pollutants are from agricultural, industrial, and household waste. There are 36 industries that discharge their pollution sources directly into the Nile, and 41 into irrigation canals. These types of industries are: chemical, electrical, engineering, fertilizers, food, metal, mining, oil and soap, pulp and paper, refractory, textile and wood. There are over 90 agricultural drains that discharge into the Nile that also include industrial wastewater. The water exceeds the European Community Standards of fecal contamination and there is a high salinization and saline intrusion in the delta. Salinization happens when there’s a buildup of salts in the soil. The soil cannot retain water which prevents anything from growing. Saline intrusion is when the ground is saturated with saltwater. The northeast Nile Delta region has a high incident rate of pancreatic cancer that is believed to be from high levels of heavy metals and organchlorine pesticides found in the soil and water. Exposure to cadmium is most commonly known through smoking, though it is believed that in this region, the exposure is from contact through the heavy metals and pesticides found in the soil and water. Schistosomiasis (a disease caused by parasitic worms) has been found in irrigation canals along with benthic cyanobacteria forming mats.

=== Irrigation canals ===
Agriculture is the largest consumer of water in Egypt using about 85% of available water. Drainage water from the agricultural fields contains pollutants such as pesticide residues, toxic organic and inorganic pollutants, salts and treated and untreated domestic wastewater. In the East – Delta drains – Faraskour, Serw and Hadous, samples of the water contained high levels of hookworms and other intestinal helminth eggs. In villages where the only available water is from irrigation canals, the water is used for domestic purposes and dumped back into the drainages. In some areas, low water levels do not reach the waterways, so farmers build illegal waterwheels to get the water up the canals to irrigate their land. Lack of drainage canals and the enforcement by officials to address these problems contribute to pollution of land and water. Villagers drinking polluted water have been affected with kidney and liver diseases. Animal manure, dredged sediments from drains and sludge for fertilizer are leached and the contaminants are a major source of pollution. Agricultural drainage water reuse is used by farmers legally and illegally. Improper irrigation and lack of education on effective irrigation methods and crop production contributes to crop failure and polluting of canals. In areas where there is no formal operational structure for pumping water of individual diesel pumps, the tail-end users usually are not getting enough water to maintain crops.

=== Government and farmers ===
There are twenty-five agencies under seven ministries that are involved in maintaining water quality, but communications and data-sharing between agencies are underdeveloped. Water user associations, nongovernmental associations of farmers who organize an irrigation process of all agricultural land, maintain diesel pumps and deal with conflicts between farmers and water management. They have been around since 1988 but have lacked structure and the inclusion of women, who are seen as contributors to pollution of irrigation canals since they wash clothes, dishes and animals in drainages.

The lack of planning, corruption in governmental departments, the neglecting of concerns and disbursement of low-quality land to the poor, the improper education of safe handling methods and improper irrigation and crop management for men and women, all contribute to poor water quality. Money is a major factor in improving these areas, but in the case of erasing corruption and improving interdepartmental communication, stricter rules and enforcement can be done immediately. Increasing Water User Associations (WUAs) and establishing a communication chain between them and government departments are recommended. Appointing field supervisors for designated areas to oversee WUAs and educate farmers on irrigation methods (like drip irrigation that applies water to the root zone and can reduce water use by 30 to 60 percent), effective water distribution during crop cycle, crop rotation and soil management. Field supervisors can also monitor water levels, check on the maintenance of pumps and report on drainage structures.

The World Bank has financed the agricultural drainage program in Egypt since 1970. The program equips agricultural land with subsurface drains, which are made of plastic pipes produced in government-owned plants in the Nile Valley and Delta. Landholders pay for the installation of drains on a 20-year interest-free annual installments. Subsurface drainage has shown to improve soil conditions and crop yield. Educating farmers on using subsurface drainages is needed to prevent a disruption of water supply to all connected fields. Since the drainages cannot be seen on the surface, a farmer who closes a drain to keep more water in his field prevent water from reaching users beyond it.

== See also ==
- Water resources management in Egypt
- 2025 Egyptian–Ethiopian crisis
