= Ethiopian Electric Power =

Ethiopian hydroelectric industry

- Native name: የኢትዮጵያ ኤሌክትሪክ ኃይል
- Type: State-owned enterprise
- Industry: Electric generation
- Founded: 1956; 70 years ago
- Headquarters: Addis Ababa, Ethiopia
- Area served: Ethiopia, Djibouti
- Key people: Abraham Belay (CEO)
- Website: www.eep.gov.et

Ethiopian Electric Power (Amharic: የኢትዮጵያ ኤሌክትሪክ ኃይል) is an Ethiopian electrical power industry and state-owned electric producer. It is engaged in development, investment, construction, operation, and management of power plants, power generation and power transmission. The company is a main key in the Ethiopian energy sector.

Ethiopian Electric Power owns and operates the Ethiopian national power grid with all high voltage power transmission lines above 66 kV including all attached electrical substations and almost all power plants within the national power grid (with the exception of some co-generation power plants belonging to the state-owned Ethiopian Sugar Corporation). Ethiopian Electric power is almost the state monopoly in generating electric power for the national power grid, although Ethiopia also allows independent power producers to construct and to operate power plants for delivering power to the national grid since 2017.

Electric power distribution and the operation of power transmission lines of ≤66 kV within the national power grid is not part of the activities of Ethiopian Electric Power, that is done by the also state-owned sister company Ethiopian Electric Utility.

Small and isolated self-contained power generation systems and power plants not attached to the national power grid do also exist in Ethiopia with generation capacities of up to 5MW_{e}. These local power producers do not belong to Ethiopian Electric Power and can be privately owned or owned by regional authorities. The power transmission and power distribution from those self-contained power plants is not part of the business operations of Ethiopian Electric Power either.

== History ==
The company was formed in 1956 as the Ethiopian Electric Light & Power Authority (EELPA), which bundled all Ethiopian activities around electricity in a single organization. In 1996, EELPA was split into the Ethiopia Electric Authority (EEA), taking over all regulating activities and a company, Ethiopian Electric Power Corporation (EEPCo), bundling all activities from power generation to household delivery. In 2013, EEPCo was again split up into two companies, Ethiopian Electric Utility and Ethiopian Electric Power. Ethiopian Electric Power was formed by Council of Ministers Regulation No.302/2013.

The first (2013) CEO of Ethiopian Electric Power was Azeb Asnake, replaced in August 2018 by Abraham Belay. In 2016, Ethiopian Electric Power had more than 3500 employees.
