= Simegnew Bekele =

Ethiopian civil engineer (1964–2018)

Simegnew Bekele ስመኘው በቀለ
- Born: 13 September 1964; Maksegnit, Begemder, Ethiopian Empire
- Died: 26 July 2018 (aged 53); Meskel Square, Addis Ababa, Ethiopia
- Cause of death: Gunshot wounds
- Burial place: Holy Trinity Cathedral, Addis Ababa, Ethiopia
- Education: Addis Ababa University
- Occupation: Civil engineer
- Children: 3

Chief project manager of the Grand Ethiopian Renaissance Dam
- In office 2011 – 26 July 2018
- Preceded by: Post established
- Succeeded by: Kifle Horo

Simegnew Bekele Aynalem (Amharic: ስመኘው በቀለ አይናለም; 13 September 1964 – 26 July 2018) was an Ethiopian civil engineer who served as chief project manager of the Grand Ethiopian Renaissance Dam project as well as three other similar dam projects in Ethiopia. He was considered the "public face" of the dam project.

== Biography ==
Simegnew was born in 1964 in the small town of Maksegnit located in Begmeder Province. He completed a course at the Ethiopian Electric Power Corporation (EEPCo) technical training center in 1986. He taught at the institution for a while after graduating with a degree in Civil Engineering from Addis Ababa University in 1997. He served as deputy project manager for the Gilgel Gibe I and the project manager for the Gilgel Gibe II dams. In 2011 he was designated as head of the Ethiopian Renaissance Dam Project Office (GERDPO), since the start of its construction in 2011. In 2015 the Tigrai Online e-magazine named him as its person of the year.

== Death ==
On the morning of 26 July 2018, Simegnew was found shot dead in his Toyota Land Cruiser in Meskel Square, Addis Ababa. Speaking at a press conference, Ethiopian Federal Police Commissioner Zeynu Ummer said that he had been found with a Colt gun in his right hand and a bullet wound behind his left ear, however foul play has been suspected. Simegnew had been scheduled to give a press conference on the progress of the dam later that day, following comments by Prime Minister Abiy Ahmed that construction could take up to ten more years, far more than previous projections. He was the public face of the dam being built near the country's western border with Sudan that, when completed, would be Africa's largest.

Simegnew's death is the second of a high-profile company official at around that time. In May, gunmen ambushed and killed Deep Kamara, the country manager for Nigeria's Dangote Cement, alongside two others in the Oromia region outside Addis Ababa. Simegnew's death sparked protests in Addis Ababa, with marchers demanding justice for what they assumed was his assassination. Tens of thousands of people gathered in Meskel Square and along Menelik II Avenue to witness his funeral procession on 29 July. Prime Minister Abiy Ahmed reacted to the news, saying he was "saddened and utterly shocked" by the engineer's death. On 7 September, police investigation reports suggested that Simegnew committed suicide by self-inflicted gunshot wounds. Conspiracy theories relating to his death circulated by some skeptics who promote anti-governmental rhetoric, whether he was killed by government agent.

== See also ==
- Assassination of Girma Yeshitila
