= Addis Standard =

Ethiopian monthly social, economic and political news magazine

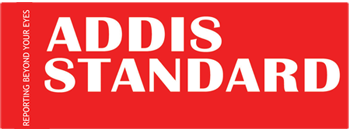
- Editor: Tsedale Lemma
- Frequency: Monthly
- Format: News magazine
- Publisher: JAKENN Publishing P.L.C.
- Founded: February 2011
- Company: Addis Standard Publications
- Country: Ethiopia
- Based in: Addis Ababa
- Language: Afaan Oromo, Amharic, English
- Website: addisstandard.com

Addis Standard is an Ethiopian monthly social, economic and political news magazine published and distributed by Jakenn Publishing Plc, and was established in February 2011 by Tsedale Lemma, who is also the editor-in-chief of the magazine as of January 2021. The magazine has an independent political stance, and is headquartered in Addis Ababa.

== Distribution ==
Addis Standard is distributed in Ghana, Burundi and South Sudan in addition to its native country, Ethiopia.

== Repression ==
Addis Standard discontinued its print edition in October 2016 in response to censorship, while continuing to publish online. It resumed a monthly print edition in 2018.

During the Tigray war, one of the Addis Standard editors involved in covering Tigray Region, Medihane Ekubamichael, was detained for a month. He was freed in early December 2020. In 2021 the media regulatory of the Ethiopian government had suspended Addis Standard, but later the suspension was withdrawn by the government.

On 24 February 2026, the Ethiopian Media Authority revoked the license of Addis Standard on charges of harming national interests. Two months later, on 15 April, managing editor Million Beyene was visited by unidentified individuals who took him to an undisclosed location. Jakenn Publishing contacted both city and federal law enforcement in an attempt to locate him, but both stated that Million was not in their custody, leaving his whereabouts unknown as of April 2026.

On 1 August 2026, security personnel raided the Addis Standard's offices and assaulted and detained its editor-in-chief, Yonas Kedir. He was released after 24 hours of interrogation.
