= Hagos =

Hagos is a personal name, following the Habesha name system, of Ethiopian and Eritrean origin. Notable people with the name include:

- Bahta Hagos (died 1894), a leader of Eritrean resistance to foreign domination
- Desta Hagos (born 1952), Ethiopian painter
- Mesfin Hagos (born 1947), Eritrean politician, Minister of Defence during the 1990s
- Yared Hagos (born 1983), Swedish ice hockey player
- Hagos Gebrhiwet (born 1994), Ethiopian long-distance runner
