= Tsedale Lemma =

Ethiopian journalist

- Born: 1976
- Occupation: Journalist

Tsedale Lemma is an Ethiopian journalist who founded Addis Standard, a highly influential Ethiopian newspaper, in 2011.

== Childhood and education ==
Tsedale Lemma was born in 1976 (age 49–50). She graduated with a Bachelor of Arts degree in print journalism from Addis Ababa University and a diploma in online journalism from Stockholm University.

== Career ==
=== Early journalism ===
Tsedale started working as a journalist in the year 2000, becoming a senior reporter in the Addis Tribune. Here articles were published in Europe and by Xinhua News Agency.

=== Israeli embassy ===
Following the 2005 Ethiopian general election violence, Tsedale shifted from journalism to working at the Israeli embassy in Addis Ababa. She was initially a public relations advisor and later a regional political affairs and media advisor to the ambassador.

=== Addis Standard ===
After leaving the Israeli embassy in 2010, Tsedale founded Addis Standard in February 2011 as a monthly magazine. Tsedale played a major role in Addis Standard becoming a highly influential publication in Ethiopia. As of January 2021, she remained the newspaper's editor-in-chief.

== Academic roles ==
Tsedale has been a member of the International Advisory Board of Bandung: Journal of the Global South since 2015, remaining on the board as of 2021.

== Points of view ==
=== Eritrea ===
In 2012, commenting on a limited Ethiopian military attack on targets in Eritrea during the low-intensity, long-term phase of the Eritrean–Ethiopian War, Tsedale described the Eritrean government as authoritarian, generally unliked in the region, and vulnerable, and saw the Ethiopian government to be in a strong position. She recommended "diplomatic precision rather than military muscle" as a strategy for removal of the Eritrean government.

=== Press freedom ===
In 2013, Tsedale criticised the Committee to Protect Journalists and "almost all exiled Ethiopian journalists" for oversimplifying the difficulties of independent media in Ethiopia, in a way that "humiliat[ed] and discredited" journalists continuing to carry out independent journalism in Ethiopia despite government repression. She criticised the Ethiopian government of the time for being satisfied with being less repressive towards the media than earlier governments, rather than significantly allowing media freedom. Tsedale criticised the glorification of the death of Meles Zenawi.

In January 2021, Tsedale described the Abiy Ahmed liberalisation of Ethiopia as having transformed the threats to the independent press from purely vertical (government repression) to a mix of vertical and horizontal pressure, where political, religious and civil society organisations and powerful individuals sought to influence the media. She stated that the return to repression of the media caused stress on those producing independent media. Tsedale criticised the world's media's attention to Abiy's 2019 Nobel Peace Prize, arguing that it was hysterical, naive and lacked historical and local perspective, such as the Addis Standard 12 December 2019 "morning after Oslo" editorial. She said that international media had started looking at Abiy's actions, instead of only his words, and that the government was responding by organising information campaigns on online social networks.

=== Women's rights ===
Tsedale promoted women's rights for the 8 March 2014 International Women's Day by moderating a United Nations supported debate at Addis Ababa University titled "Equality for Woman is Progress for All: Celebrating Ethiopian Women's Achievements in Ethiopia", among seven prominent women panelists, Aster Zaoude, Birtukan Gebregzi, Chachi Tadesse, Desta Hagos, Ingidaye Eshete, Selamawit Adugna and Zenaye Tadesse.

=== Abiy Ahmed ===
In an opinion piece published in The New York Times in early November 2020, at the beginning of the Tigray War, Tsedale complimented Ethiopian prime minister Abiy Ahmed for his initial democratisation of Ethiopia, stating, "Presenting himself as a reformer, the avalanche of changes promised by Mr. Abiy, who took over in April 2018, seemed to avert the worst of the country’s problems," but judged that afterwards, he "overreached", leading to the Tigray War. She expressed her worry that "Free speech, civil liberties and due process [could] fall afoul of the turn to militarism and repression" and stated that Abiy appeared "not inclined to de-escalate".

Journalist Abebe Gellaw responded, arguing that Tsedale should have criticised the Tigray People's Liberation Front (TPLF), for its three decades of "misrule, domination, exploitation, discrimination, gross human rights violations, and massive corruption". Abebe stated, "TPLF has been throwing every spanner at its disposal to undermine and reverse the reform and wreak havoc across Ethiopia in its futile bid to retake the power and privilege it has lost." Abebe claimed that Tsedale's opinion piece was deliberately misleading and based on "anger and frustration".
