= Ethiopian State Justice Bureaus =

Part of the executive branch in state government of Ethiopia

The Ethiopian State Justice Bureaus are part of the executive branch of the State government of Ethiopia and supervised by Ministry of Justice (MoJ) order and mandate.

== Description ==
They bureaus similar powers and function to MoJ. The Head of a State Justice Bureau has similar powers with the Federal Minister of Justice.

The Ethiopian judicial system consists of dual judicial system, state legislature, state council and state Police and Prison Commissions. In the FDRE Constitution, both MoJ and Justice Bureaus do not officiate authority over the federal and state courts respectively.

== See also ==
- Law enforcement in Ethiopia
