= Yared Zerihun =

Ethiopian politician

- ያሬድ ዘሪሁን

Commissioner General of the Ethiopian Federal Police
- In office 19 April 2018 – 25 June 2018
- Appointed by: Abiy Ahmed
- President: Mulatu Teshome
- Prime Minister: Abiy Ahmed
- Preceded by: Assefa Abiyo
- Succeeded by: Zeynu Ummer

Yared Zerihun (Amharic: ያሬድ ዘሪሁን) is an Ethiopian politician who served as Commissioner General of the Ethiopian Federal Police from April to June 2018.

== Career ==
He served as deputy chief of the National Intelligence and Security Service (NISS) until Prime Minister Abiy Ahmed reshuffled his cabinet.

On 19 April 2018, Yared was appointed Commissioner General of the Ethiopian Federal Police, replacing Assefa Abyou. In June 2018, he was removed due to a health issue.

On 14 November 2018, Yared was arrested by police amidst investigation of alleged corruption and human rights abuses during the EPRDF regime.
