= Grand Ethiopian Renaissance Dam =

Gravity dam on the Blue Nile River in Ethiopia

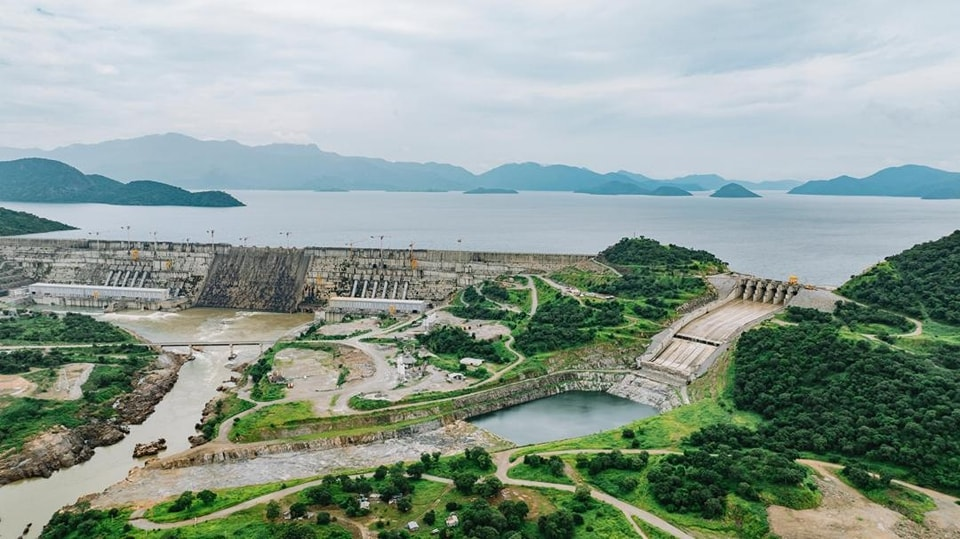
- The main dam after full filling in August 2024
- Interactive map of Grand Ethiopian Renaissance Dam
- Official name: Amharic: ታላቁ የኢትዮጵያ ሕዳሴ ግድብ; Tigrinya: ግድብ ሕዳሰ ኢትዮጵያ; Oromo: Hidha Guddicha Haaromsa Itoophiyaa
- Country: Ethiopia
- Location: Guba, Benishangul-Gumuz Region
- Coordinates: 11°12′55″N 35°05′35″E
- Purpose: Power
- Status: Operational
- Construction began: 2 April 2011; 15 years ago
- Opening date: 9 September 2025; 12 months ago
- Construction cost: More than US$5 billion
- Owner: Ethiopian Electric Power

Dam and spillways
- Type of dam: Gravity, roller-compacted concrete
- Impounds: Blue Nile River
- Height: 145 m (476 ft)
- Length: 1,780 m (5,840 ft)
- Elevation at crest: 655 m (2,149 ft)
- Dam volume: 10,400,000 m^{3} (13,600,000 cu yd)
- Spillways: 1 gated, 2 ungated
- Spillway type: 6 sector gates for the gated spillway
- Spillway capacity: 14,700 m^{3}/s (520,000 cu ft/s) for the gated spillway

Reservoir
- Creates: Nigat Lake
- Total capacity: 74×10^{9} m^{3} (60,000,000 acre⋅ft)
- Active capacity: 59.2×10^{9} m^{3} (48,000,000 acre⋅ft)
- Inactive capacity: 14.8×10^{9} m^{3} (12,000,000 acre⋅ft)
- Catchment area: 172,250 km^{2} (66,510 mi^{2})
- Surface area: 1,874 km^{2} (724 mi^{2})
- Maximum length: 246 km (153 mi)
- Maximum water depth: 140 m (460 ft)
- Normal elevation: 640 m (2,100 ft)

Power Station
- Operator: Ethiopian Electric Power
- Commission date: 20 February 2022–August 2024
- Turbines: 11 x 400 MW; 2 x 375 MW; Francis turbines
- Installed capacity: 5.15 GW
- Capacity factor: 28.6%
- Annual generation: 15.76 TWh (est., planned)
- Website www.hidasse.gov.et

The Grand Ethiopian Renaissance Dam (GERD or TaIHiGe; Amharic: ታላቁ የኢትዮጵያ ሕዳሴ ግድብ, romanized: Tālāqu ye-Ītyōppyā Hidāsē Gidib, Tigrinya: ግድብ ሕዳሰ ኢትዮጵያ, Oromo: Hidha Guddicha Haaromsa Itoophiyaa), formerly known as the Millennium Dam and sometimes referred to as the Hidase Dam (Amharic: ሕዳሴ ግድብ, romanized: Hidāsē Gidib, Oromo: Hidha Hidāsē), is a gravity dam on the Blue Nile River in Ethiopia. The dam is in the Metekel Zone of the Benishangul-Gumuz Region, close to the border with Sudan.

Constructed between 2011 and 2025, the dam's primary purpose is electricity production to relieve Ethiopia's acute energy shortage and to export electricity to neighbouring countries. With an installed capacity of 5.15 gigawatts, the dam is the largest hydroelectric power plant in Africa and among the 20 largest in the world.

The first phase of filling the reservoir began in July 2020 and in August 2020 the water level rose to an altitude of 540 metres (40 metres higher than the bottom of the river, which is at an altitude of 500 metres above sea level). The second phase of filling was completed on 19 July 2021, with water levels rising to an altitude of around 575 metres. The third filling was completed on 12 August 2022 to an altitude of 600 metres (2,000 ft). The fourth filling was completed on 10 September 2023 with water levels around 625 metres (2,051 ft). The fifth and last filling was completed in October 2024, with a final water level 640 metres (2,100 ft). The plant was formally inaugurated on 9 September 2025.

On 20 February 2022, the dam produced electricity for the first time, delivering 375 MW to the grid. A second 375 MW turbine was commissioned in August 2022. The third and fourth 400 MW turbines were commissioned in August 2024. The dam's official opening was 9 September 2025.

== Background ==
The name that the Blue Nile river takes in Ethiopia ("Abay") is derived from the Ge'ez word for 'great' to imply its being 'the river of rivers'. The word Abay still exists in Ethiopian major languages to refer to anything or anyone considered to be superior.

The site chosen for the Grand Ethiopian Renaissance Dam was identified by the United States Bureau of Reclamation in the course of the Blue Nile survey, which was conducted between 1956 and 1964 during the reign of Emperor Haile Selassie. However due to the coup d'état of 1974, Somalia's invasion of Ethiopia in 1977–78, and the 15-year-long Ethiopian Civil War, the project did not progress until the early 2000s. The Ethiopian Government surveyed the site in October 2009 and August 2010. In November 2010, a design for the dam was submitted.

On 31 March 2011, a day after the project was made public, a US$4.8 billion contract was awarded without competitive bidding to Italian company Salini Impregilo, and the dam's foundation stone was laid on 2 April 2011 by the Prime Minister Meles Zenawi. A rock-crushing plant was constructed, along with a small air strip for fast transportation. The expectation was for the first two power-generation turbines to become operational after 44 months of construction, or early 2015.

Egypt, located over 2,500 kilometres (1,600 mi) downstream of the site, opposes the dam, which it believes would reduce the amount of Nile water available to Egypt. Zenawi argued, based on an unnamed study, that the dam would not reduce water availability downstream and would also regulate water for irrigation. In May 2011, it was announced that Ethiopia would share blueprints for the dam with Egypt so that the downstream impact could be examined.

The dam was originally called "Project X". After its contract was announced, it was called the Millennium Dam. On 15 April 2011, the Council of Ministers renamed it Grand Ethiopian Renaissance Dam. Ethiopia has a potential for about 45 GW of hydropower. The dam is being funded by government bonds and private donations. It was slated for completion in July 2017.

The potential impacts of the dam have been the source of international controversy. Egypt depends on the Nile for about 90% of its water. The Government of Egypt demanded that Ethiopia cease construction on the dam as a precondition to negotiations, and some political leaders have discussed methods to sabotage it. Egypt planned a diplomatic initiative to undermine the dam's finance and construction provided by Norway and Italy. However, governments of other countries in the Nile Basin Initiative expressed support for the dam. This includes Sudan, the only other nation downstream of the Blue Nile, although Sudan's position towards the dam varied over time. In 2014, Sudan accused Egypt of inflaming the situation.

Ethiopia denies that the dam will have a negative impact on downstream water flows and contends that the dam will, in fact, increase water flows to Egypt by reducing evaporation on Lake Nasser. Ethiopia has accused Egypt of being unreasonable. In October 2019, Egypt stated that talks with Sudan and Ethiopia over the operation of a $4 billion hydropower dam that Ethiopia is building on the Nile have reached a deadlock. Beginning in November 2019, U.S. Secretary of the Treasury Steven T. Mnuchin began facilitating negotiations among the three countries.

== Cost and financing ==
The Grand Ethiopian Renaissance Dam (GERD) is estimated to cost close to 5 billion US dollars, about 7% of the 2016 Ethiopian gross national product. The lack of international financing for projects on the Blue Nile River has persistently been attributed to Egypt's campaign to keep control of Nile water sharing. Ethiopia was forced to finance the GERD with crowdsourcing through internal fundraising in the form of selling bonds and persuading employees to contribute a portion of their incomes. Contributions are made in the newly official website confirmed by the verified account of the Office of the Prime Minister of Ethiopia

Of the total cost, 1 billion US dollars for turbines and electrical equipment was funded by the Exim Bank of China.

== Design ==
The design changed several times between 2011 and 2019. This affected both the electrical and storage parameters.

Originally, in 2011, the hydropower plant was to receive 15 generating units with 350 MW nameplate capacity each, resulting in a total installed capacity of 5,250 MW with an expected power generation of 15,128 GWh per year. Its planned generation capacity was later increased to 6,000 MW, through 16 generating units with 375 MW nominal capacity each. The expected power generation was estimated at 15,692 GWh per year. In 2017, the design was again changed to add another 450 MW for a total of 6,450 MW, with a planned power generation of 16,153 GWh per year. That was achieved by upgrading 14 of the 16 generating units from 375 MW to 400 MW without changing the nominal capacity. According to a senior Ethiopian official, on 17 October 2019, the power generation capacity of the GERD is now 5,150 MW, with 13 turbines (2x 375 MW and 11x 400 MW) down from 16 turbines.

Not only did the electrical power parameters change over time, but so did the storage parameters. Originally, in 2011, the dam was planned to be 145 m (476 ft) tall with a volume of 10.1 million m³. The reservoir was planned to have a volume of 66 km^{3} (54,000,000 acre⋅ft) and a surface area of 1,680 km^{2} (650 mi^{2}) at full supply level. The rock-filled saddle dam beside the main dam was planned to have a height of 45 m (148 ft) meters, a length of 4,800 m (15,700 ft) and a volume of 15 million m³.

In 2013, an Independent Panel of Experts (IPoE) assessed the dam and its technological parameters. At that time, the reservoir sizes were changed already. The size of the reservoir at full supply level went up to 1,874 km^{2} (724 mi^{2}), an increase of 194 km^{2} (75 sq mi). The storage volume at full supply level had increased to 74 km^{3} (60,000,000 acre⋅ft), an increase of 7 km^{3} (1.7 cu mi). These numbers did not change after 2013. The storage volume of 74 km^{3} (60,000,000 acre⋅ft) represents nearly the entire 84 km^{3} (68,000,000 acre⋅ft) annual flow of the Nile.

After the IPoE made its recommendations, in 2013, the dam parameters were changed to account for higher flow volumes in case of extreme floods: a main dam height of 155 m (509 ft), an increase of 10 m (33 ft), with a length of 1,780 m (5,840 ft) (no change) and a dam volume of 10.2 million cubic metres (360×10^{6} cu ft), an increase of 100,000 m^{3} (3,500,000 cu ft). The outlet parameters did not change, only the crest of the main dam was raised. The rock saddle dam went up to a height of 50 m (160 ft), an increase of 5 metres (16 ft), with a length of 5,200 m (17,100 ft), an increase of 400 metres (1,300 ft). The volume of the rock saddle dam increased to 16.5 million cubic metres (580×10^{6} cu ft), an increase of 1.5 million cubic metres (53×10^{6} cu ft).

=== Two dams ===
Rendering of the main dam

The zero level of the main dam, the ground level, is at an elevation of about 500 m (1,600 ft) above sea level, corresponding roughly to the level of the river bed of the Blue Nile. Counting from the ground level, the main gravity dam is 145 m (476 ft) tall, 1,780 m (5,840 ft) long and composed of roller-compacted concrete. The crest of the dam is at an elevation of 655 m (2,149 ft) above sea level. The outlets of the two powerhouses are below the ground level, therefore the total height of the dam 175 m (574 ft) is slightly higher than the given height of the dam. The structural volume of the dam is 10,400,000 m^{3} (13,600,000 cu yd). The main dam is 14 km (9 mi) from the border with Sudan.

Supporting the main dam and reservoir is a curved 4.9 km (3 mi) long and 50 m (164 ft) high rock-filled saddle dam. The ground level of the saddle dam is at an elevation of about 600 m (2,000 ft) above sea level. The surface is concrete to keep the interior dry. The saddle dam is just 3.3–3.5 km (2–2 mi) away from the border with Sudan, much closer to the border than the main dam.

The reservoir behind both dams has a storage capacity of 74 km^{3} (18 cu mi) and a surface area of 1,874 km^{2} (724 sq mi) when at full supply level of 640 m (2,100 ft) above sea level. The full supply level is therefore 140 m (460 ft) above the ground level of the main dam. Hydropower generation occurs between reservoir levels of 590 m (1,940 ft), the so-called minimum operating level, and 640 m (2,100 ft), the full supply level. The live storage volume, usable for power generation between both levels is therefore 59.2 km^{3} (14.2 cu mi). The first 90 m (300 ft) of the height of the dam is a dead height for the reservoir, leading to a dead storage volume of the reservoir of 14.8 km^{3} (3.6 cu mi).

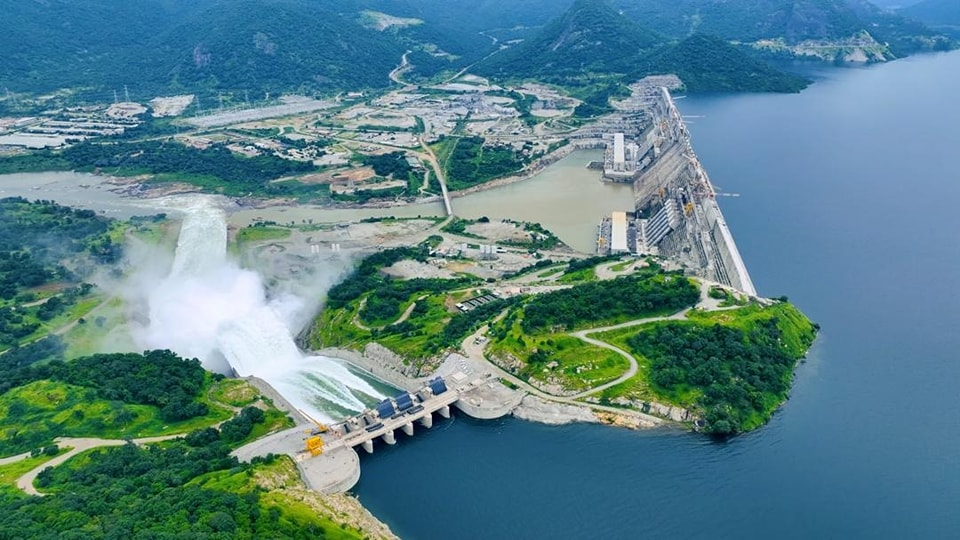
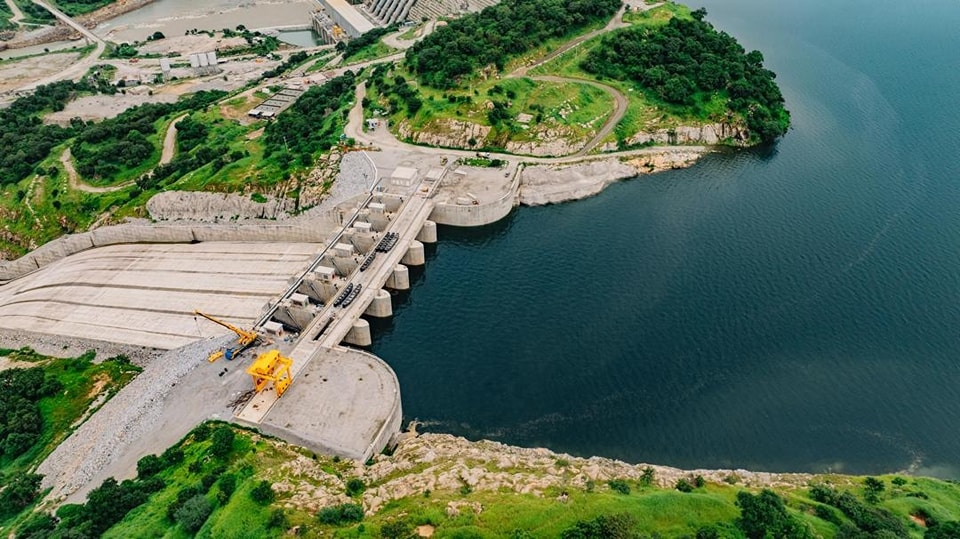
The main spillway, in 2024. Another spillway can be seen in upper photo, in the center of the main dam.

=== Three spillways ===
The project has three spillways, the primary used approximately 18,000 cubic meters of concrete. These spillways together are designed for up to 30,200 m^{3}/s (1,070,000 cu ft/s), the probable maximum flood event. All waters from the three spillways will discharge into the Blue Nile before the river enters Sudanese territory.

The main gated spillway is located to the left of the main dam and is controlled by six floodgates with a design discharge of 14,700 m^{3}/s (520,000 cu ft/s) in total. The spillway is 84 m (276 ft) wide at the outflow gates. The base level of the spillway sill is at 624.9 m (2,050 ft), well below the full supply level.

An ungated spillway, the auxiliary spillway, sits in the centre of the main dam with an open width of about 225 m (738 ft) and a design discharge of 2,800 m^{3}/s (99,000 cu ft/s). This spillway has a base-level at 640 m (2,100 ft), which is exactly the full supply level of the reservoir. The dam crest is 15 m (49 ft) higher on both sides of the spillway. This ungated spillway is only expected to be used when the reservoir is both full and the flow exceeds 14,700 m^{3}/s (520,000 cu ft/s), a flow value projected to be exceeded once every ten years.

A third spillway, an emergency spillway, is located to the right of the curved saddle dam, with a base level at 642 m (2,106 ft). This emergency spillway has an open distance about 1,200 m (3,900 ft) along its rim. This third spillway will discharge water if river flow exceeds 18,000 m^{3}/s (640,000 cu ft/s), corresponding to a flood event once every 1000 years.

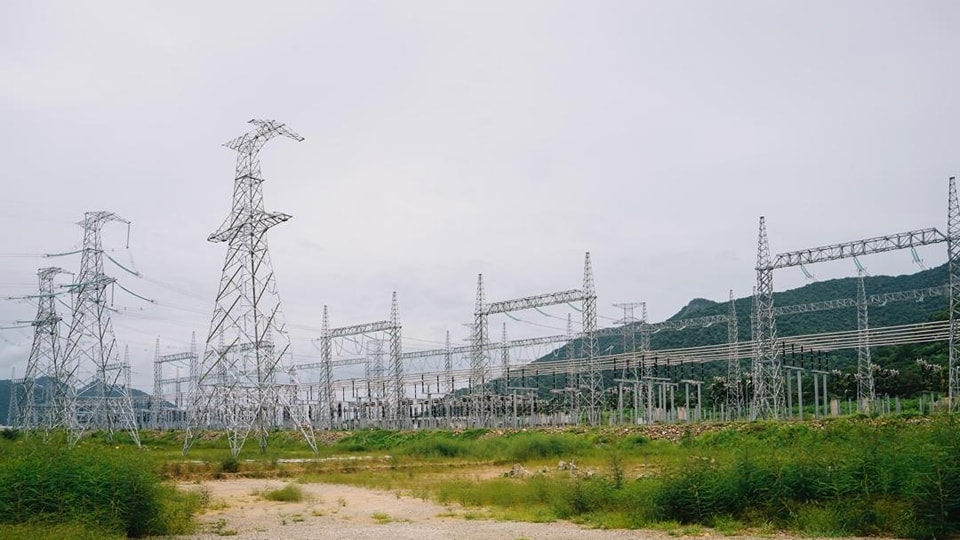
Electric power lines at the dam

=== Power generation and distribution ===
Flanking either side of the auxiliary ungated spillway at the centre of the dam are two power houses, that are equipped with 2 x 375 MW Francis turbine-generators and 11 x 400 MW turbines. The total installed capacity with all turbine-generators will be 5,150 MW. The average annual flow of the Blue Nile being available for power generation is expected to be 1,547 m^{3}/s (54,600 cu ft/s), which gives rise to an annual expectation for power generation of 16,153 GWh, corresponding to a plant load factor (or capacity factor) of 28.6%.

The Francis turbines inside the power houses are installed vertically, rising 7 m (23 ft) above the ground level. For the operation between the minimum operating level and the full supply level, the water head available to the turbines is between 83–133 m (272–436 ft). A switching station is located close to the main dam, where the generated power is delivered to the national grid. Four 500 kV main power transmission lines were completed in August 2017, all going to Holeta and then with several 400 kV lines to the metropolitan area of Addis Ababa. Two 400 kV lines run from the dam to the Beles Hydroelectric Power Plant. Also planned are 500 kV high-voltage direct current lines.

=== Early power generation ===
Two non-upgraded turbine-generators with 375 MW were the first to go into operation with 750 MW delivered to the national power grid, the first turbine was commissioned in February 2022 and the second one in August 2022. The two units sit within the 10 unit powerhouse to the right side of the dam. They are fed by two special intakes within the dam structure located at a height of 540 m (1,770 ft) above sea level. The power generation started at a water level of 560 m (1,840 ft), 30 m (98 ft) below the minimum operating level of the other 11 turbine-generators. At that level, the reservoir had been filled with roughly 5.5 km^{3} (1.3 cu mi) of water, corresponding to roughly 11% of the annual inflow of 48.8 km^{3} (11.7 cu mi). During the rainy season, this can happen within days to weeks. The first stage filling of the reservoir for early generation was completed on 20 July 2020.

=== Siltation, evaporation ===
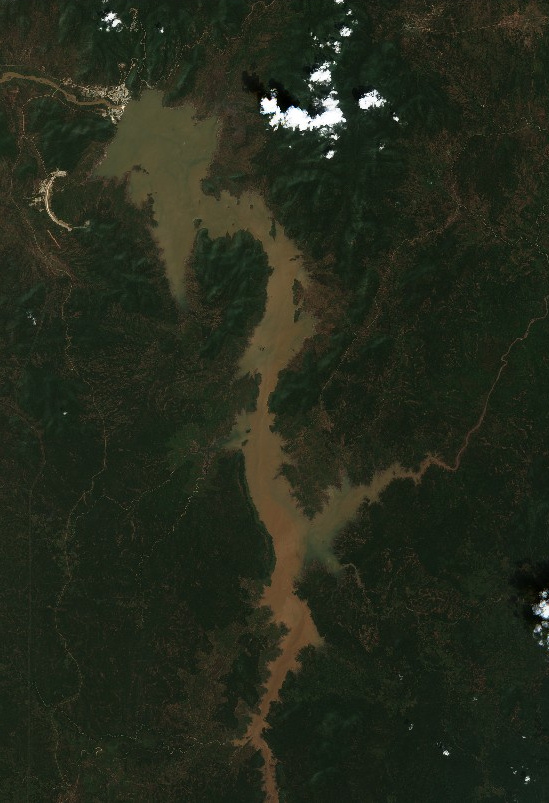
Satellite image of the reservoir on 26 October 2020

Two "bottom" outlets at 542 m (1,778 ft) above sea level or 42 m (138 ft) above the local river bed level are available for delivering water to Sudan and Egypt under special circumstances, in particular for irrigation purposes downstream, if the level of the reservoir falls below the minimum operating level of 590 m (1,940 ft) but also during the initial filling process of the reservoir.

The space below the "bottom" outlets is the primary buffer space for alluvium through siltation and sedimentation. For the Roseires Reservoir just downstream from the GERD site, the average siltation and sedimentation volume (without GERD in place) amounts to around 0.035 km^{3} (28,000 acre⋅ft) per year. Due to the large size of the GERD reservoir, its siltation and sedimentation volume is expected to be much higher, 0.21 km^{3} (170,000 acre⋅ft) per annum. The GERD reservoir will foreseeably remove any siltation threat from the Roseires reservoir.

The base of the GERD dam is at around 500 m (1,600 ft) above sea level. Water discharge from the dam will be released back into the Blue Nile which flows for only about 30 km (19 mi), before joining the Roseires reservoir, which – at maximum level – will be at 490 m (1,610 ft) above sea level. There is only a 10 m (33 ft) river elevation difference between both projects. The two reservoirs and accompanying hydropower projects could – if coordinated properly across the border between Ethiopia and Sudan – become a cascaded system for more efficient hydropower generation and enhanced irrigation (in Sudan in particular). Water from the 140 m (460 ft) column of the water storage of the GERD reservoir could be diverted through tunnels to facilitate new irrigation schemes in Sudan close to the border with South Sudan.

Evaporation of water from the reservoir is expected to be at 3% of the annual inflow volume of 48.8 km^{3} (11.7 cu mi), or 1.5 km^{3} (0.36 cu mi) annually. This was considered negligible by the IPoE. For comparison, Lake Nasser in Egypt loses between 10–16 km^{3} (2.4–3.8 cu mi) annually through evaporation.

== Construction ==
The main GERD contractor is the Italian company Webuild (formerly Salini Impregilo), which also served as primary contractor for the Gilgel Gibe II, Gilgel Gibe III and Tana Beles dams. Simegnew Bekele was the project manager of GERD from the start of construction in 2011 up to his death on 26 July 2018. In October that year, he was replaced by Kifle Horo. The dam required 10 million m³ of concrete, for which the government pledged to use only domestic production. In March 2012, Salini awarded the Italian firm Tratos Cavi SPA a contract to supply low and high voltage cable for the dam. Alstom provided the eight Francis turbines for the project's first phase, at a cost of €250 million. As of April 2013, nearly 32 percent of the project was complete, with site excavation and some concrete placement underway. One concrete batch plant was completed with another under construction. Diversion of the Blue Nile was completed on 28 May 2013 and marked by a ceremony the same day.

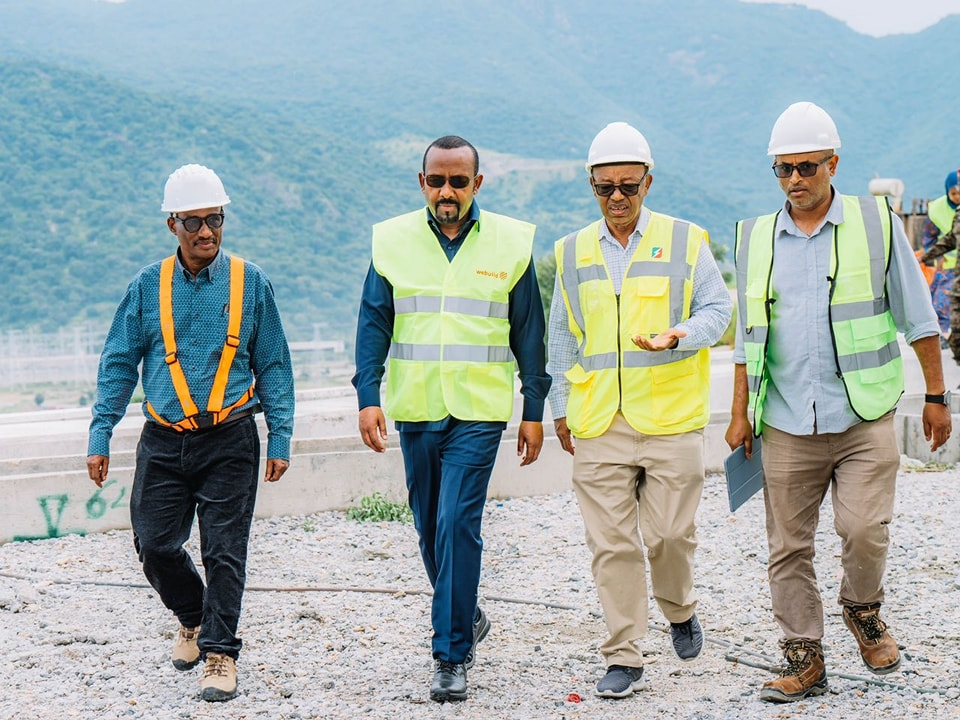
Ethiopian Prime Minister Abiy Ahmed with head engineers at the dam site

In October 2019, the work was approximately 70% complete. As of March 2020, the steelworks reached 35% complete, civil works were 87% complete while electro-mechanical works were 17% complete, to attain overall 71% construction completed according to Belachew Kasa, Project Deputy Director.

On 26 June 2020, Egypt, Sudan and Ethiopia agreed to delay filling the reservoir for a few weeks. A month later, on 21 July, Ethiopian prime minister, Abiy Ahmed, announced that the first phase of filling the reservoir had been completed. The early filling was attributed to heavy rains. In his statement, Abiy stated that "We have successfully completed the first dam filling without bothering and hurting anyone else. Now the dam is overflowing downstream". The target for the first year filling was 4.9 billion m³, while the dam has capacity to hold 74 billion m³ when completed.

The first phase of filling the reservoir began in July 2020, to a maximum depth of 70 metres (230 ft) utilising a temporary sill. Further construction work was necessary before the reservoir could be filled to a level required for electricity generation. Subsequently, it was reported that it would take between 4 and 7 years to fill with water, depending on hydrologic conditions during the filling period.

The second phase of filling of the GERD reservoir was completed on 19 July 2021, with estimates of reaching the level of 573 metres (1,880 ft) (a.m.s.l) and retaining no more than 4.5 km^{3} (1.1 cu mi) at this stage. At this time, the volume of water at the GERD reservoir approached nearly 4.12 billion m³, measured using images from the Sentinel-1A satellite.

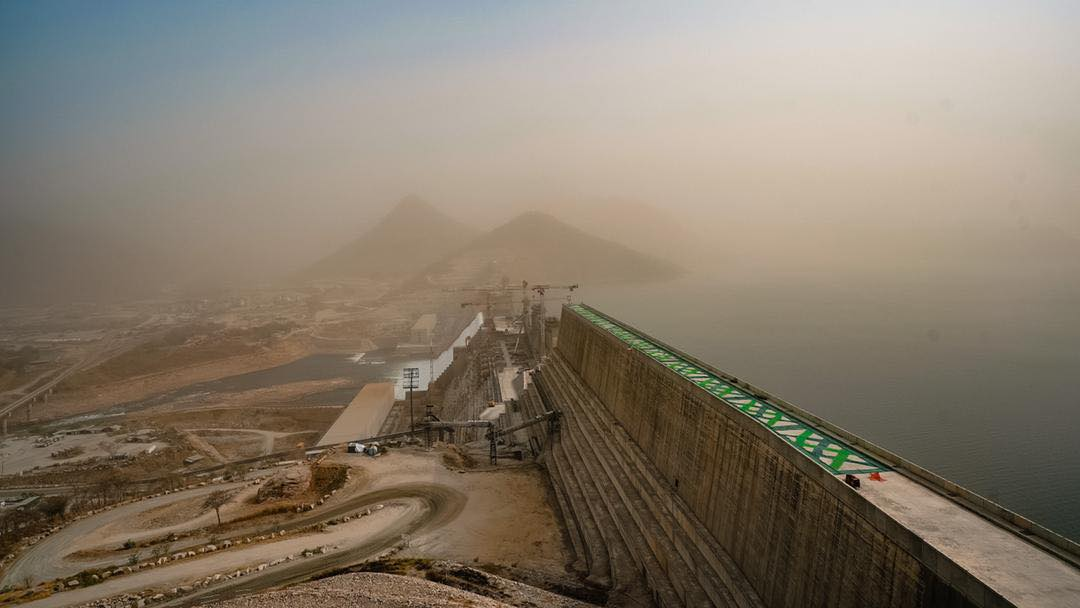
The Renaissance dam in 2022

In February 2021, Ethiopian Minister of Water and Irrigation, Seleshi Bekele, mentioned that the engineering completion reached 91%, while the total construction completion was 78.3%. In May 2021, Minister of Water and Irrigation Seleshi Bekele mentioned that 80% of dam construction was complete. The third filling of the GERD reservoir reached its conclusion on 12 August 2022, reaching a height of 600 metres (2,000 ft). As of April 2023, Ethiopia's Office of National Coordination announced that 90% of construction had been completed. Subsequently, the fourth filling was completed on 10 September 2023, with water levels reaching approximately 625 metres (2,051 ft).

In March 2024 preceding the 13th anniversary of the foundation stone laying for the Renaissance Dam project, construction reached 95% completion, which included the accomplishment of 98.9% of the civil works and 78% of the electro-mechanical work. In the meantime, the hydroelectric project boasted a capacity of 540 megawatts, facilitated by two turbines, with plans to eventually produce 5,150 megawatts. Furthermore, the dam held 42 billion m³ of water, a figure projected to rise to 74 billion m³ upon completion. Later that year, on 17 July, the fifth filling began with the goal of completion by September. The reservoir was set to hold 64 billion m³ of water, with its levels reaching approximately 640 metres (2,100 ft). In late October 2024, Prime Minister Abiy Ahmed announced in parliament that the construction of the dam had been completed. More turbines had come online since, the sixth turbine began generation in February 2025. By April 2025, the dam reached 98.66% completion, with six turbines operational. A ribbon-cutting ceremony to inaugurate the dam was held on 9 September 2025.

== Controversies ==
=== Engineering questions ===
In 2012, the International Panel of Experts was formed with experts from Egypt, Sudan, Ethiopia and other independent entities to discuss mainly engineering and partially impact related questions. This panel concluded at a number of engineering modifications, that were proposed to Ethiopia and the main contractor constructing the dam. One of the two main engineering questions, dealing with the size of flood events and the constructive response against them, was later addressed by the contractor. The emergency spillway located near the rock saddle dam saw an increase of the rim length from 300 m to 1,200 m to account even for the largest possible flood of the river.

The second main recommendation of the panel however found no immediate resolution. This second recommendation dealt with the structural integrity of the dam in context with the underlying rock basement as to avoid the danger of a sliding dam due to an unstable basement. It was argued by the panel that the original structural investigations considered only a generic rock mass without taking special conditions like faults and sliding planes in the rock basement (gneiss) into account. The panel noted that there was indeed an exposed sliding plane in the rock basement, with the potential to cause a sliding process downstream. The panel didn't argue that a catastrophic dam failure with a release of dozens of cubic kilometres of water would be possible, probable or even likely, but did argue that the safety factor with respect to avoiding such a catastrophic failure might be non-optimal in the case of the Grand Ethiopian Renaissance Dam. It was later revealed that the underlying basement of the dam was completely different from all expectations and did not fit the geological studies as the needed excavation works exposed the underlying gneiss. The engineering works then had to be adjusted, with digging and excavating deeper than originally planned, which took extra time and capacity and also required more concrete.

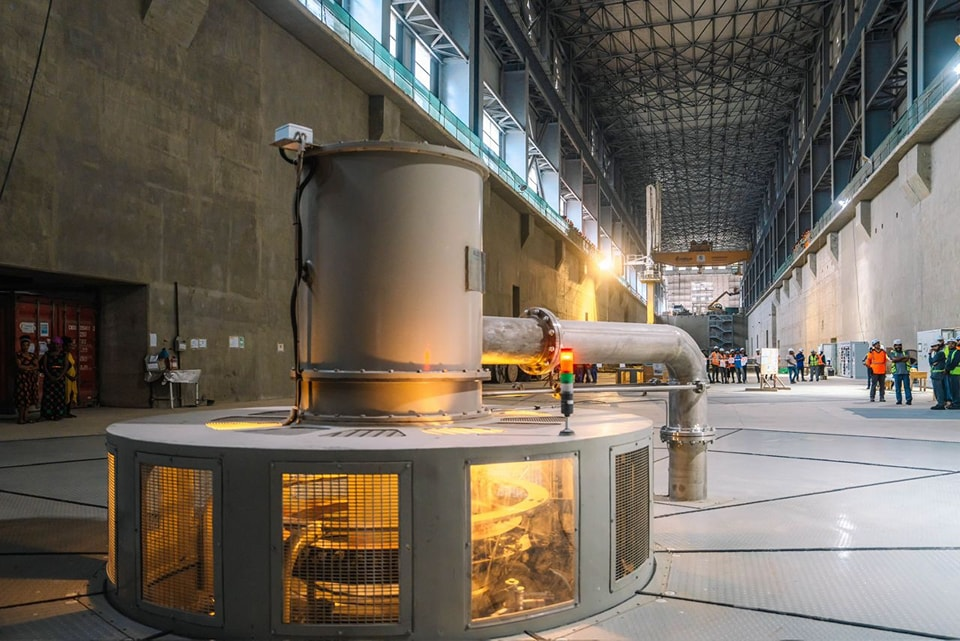
Turbines inside the dam complex

=== Alleged over-sizing ===
Originally, in 2011, the hydropower plant was to receive 15 generating units with 350 MW nameplate capacity each, resulting in a total installed capacity of 5,250 MW with an expected power generation of 15,128 GWh per annum. The capacity factor of the planned hydropower plant – the expected electricity production divided by the potential production if the power plant was utilised permanently at full capacity – was only 32.9% compared to 45–60% for other, smaller hydropower plants in Ethiopia. Critics concluded that a smaller dam would have been more cost-effective.

Soon after, in 2012, the hydropower plant was upgraded to receive 16 generating units with 375 MW nameplate capacity each, increasing the total installed capacity to 6,000 MW, with the expected power generation going up only slightly to 15,692 GWh per annum. Consequently, the capacity factor shrank to 29.9%. According to Asfaw Beyene, a professor of mechanical engineering at San Diego State University in California, the dam and its hydropower plant are massively oversized: "GERD’s available power output, based on the average of river flow throughout the year and the dam height, is about 2,000 megawatts, not 6,000. There is little doubt that the system has been designed for a peak flow rate that only happens during the two to three months of the rainy season. Targeting near peak or peak flow rate makes no economic sense."

In 2017, the total installed capacity was moved to 6,450 MW, without changing the number and nameplate capacity of the generating units (which then remained at 6,000 MW in total). This was thought to arrive from enhancements made to the generators. The expected power generation per annum went up to 16,153 GWh, the capacity factor shrank again and reached 28.6%. This time nobody publicly voiced concern. Such optimisation of the Francis turbines used at the dam site is indeed possible and is usually done by the provider of the turbines taking into account site-specific conditions.

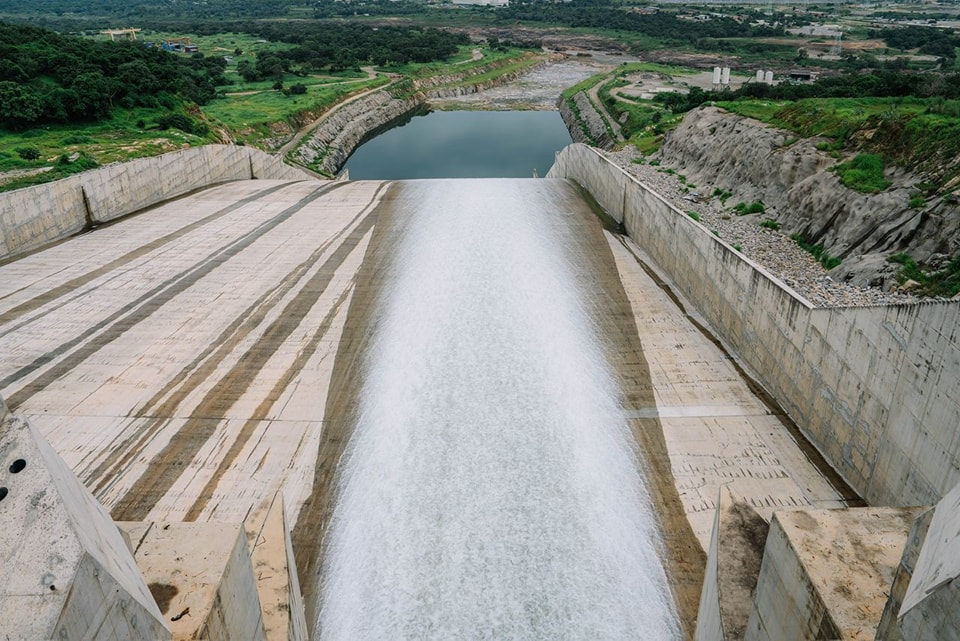
Water moving past the dam into Sudan later inevitably to the Mediterranean Sea

Considering the critics voiced about the alleged over-sizing of the possible power output, now of 6,450 MW. Ethiopia is relying heavily on hydropower, but the country is often affected by droughts (see e.g. 2011 East Africa drought). The water reservoirs used for power generation in Ethiopia have a limited size. For example, the Gilgel Gibe I reservoir, that feeds both the Gilgel Gibe I powerplant and the Gilgel Gibe II Power Station, has a capacity of 0.7 km^{3}. In times of drought, there is no water left to generate electrical power. This heavily affected Ethiopia in the drought years 2015/16 and it was only the Gilgel Gibe III powerplant, that in 2016 just started to run in trial service on a 14 km^{3} well-filled reservoir, that saved the economy of Ethiopia. The GERD reservoir, once it has been filled, has a total water volume of 74 km^{3}, 3 times the volume of Ethiopia's largest lake, Lake Tana. Filling it takes 5–15 years and even by using all generating units at maximum capacity will not drain it within a few months. The installed power of 6,450 MW in combination with the size of the reservoir will help to manage the side effects of the next severe drought, when other hydropower plants have to stop their operations.

=== Deaths ===
Ethiopia’s Minister of Water and Energy, Habtamu Itefa, claimed that approximately 15,000 Ethiopian workers were reported to have died over the course of the dam project's 14-year construction. However, senior engineers on the project refuted the number, calling it a "misinterpretation", and suggested that the number of deaths was much smaller, likely under 100.

== Security around dam ==
In recent years due to the threat of a possible Egyptian airstrike on the dam, the Ethiopian government has sought and bought several air defence systems from Russia, including the Pantsir-S1 air defence system, and from Israel, including the SPYDER-MR medium-range air defence system which was installed at the dam. Egypt sought to block the sale between Israel and Ethiopia but Israel ignored the request.

== Benefits ==
A major benefit of the dam will be hydropower production. All the energy generated by GERD will be going into the national grid of Ethiopia to fully support the development of the whole country, both in rural and urban areas. The role of GERD will be to act as a stabilising backbone of the Ethiopian national grid. There will be exports, but only if there is a total surplus of energy generated in Ethiopia. This is mainly expected to happen during rainy seasons, when there is plenty of water for hydropower generation.

The eventual surplus electricity of GERD which does not fit the demand inside Ethiopia, is then to be sold and exported to neighbouring countries including Sudan and possibly Egypt, but also Djibouti. Exporting the electricity from the dam would require the construction of massive transmission lines to major consumption centers such as Sudan's capital Khartoum, located more than 400 km away from the dam. These export sales would come on top of electricity that is expected to be sold from other large hydropower plants. Powerplants that have been readied or are under construction in Ethiopia, such as Gilgel Gibe III or Koysha, whose exports (if given surplus energy) will mainly be going to Kenya through a 500 kV HVDC line.

The volume of the reservoir will be two to three times that of Lake Tana. Up to 7,000 tonnes of fish are expected to be harvested annually. The reservoir may become a tourist destination.

Sudan expected fewer floods thanks to the dam, but this was not initially observed.

== Environmental and social impacts ==
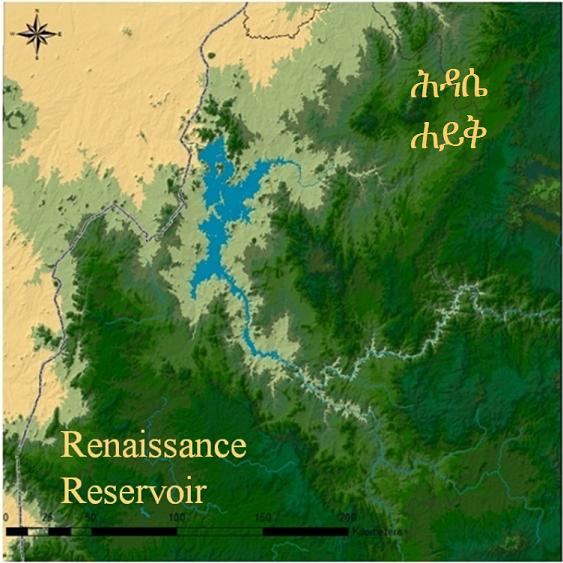
Renaissance Reservoir

The NGO International Rivers has commissioned a local researcher to make a field visit because so little environmental impact information is publicly available.

Public consultation about dams in Ethiopia is affected by the political climate in the country. International Rivers reports that "conversations with civil society groups in Ethiopia indicate that questioning the government's energy sector plans is highly risky, and there are legitimate concerns of government persecution. Because of this political climate, no groups are actively pursuing the issues surrounding hydro-power dams, nor publicly raising concerns about the risks in this situation, extremely limited and inadequate public consultation has been organised" during the implementation of major dams.

In June 2011, Ethiopian journalist Reeyot Alemu was imprisoned after she raised questions about the proposed Grand Millennium Dam. Staff of International Rivers have received death threats. Former prime minister Meles Zenawi called opponents of the project "hydropower extremists" and "bordering on the criminal" at a conference of the International Hydropower Association (IHA) in Addis Ababa in April 2011. At the conference, the Ethiopian state power utility was embraced as a "Sustainability Partner" by the IHA.

=== Impact on Ethiopia ===
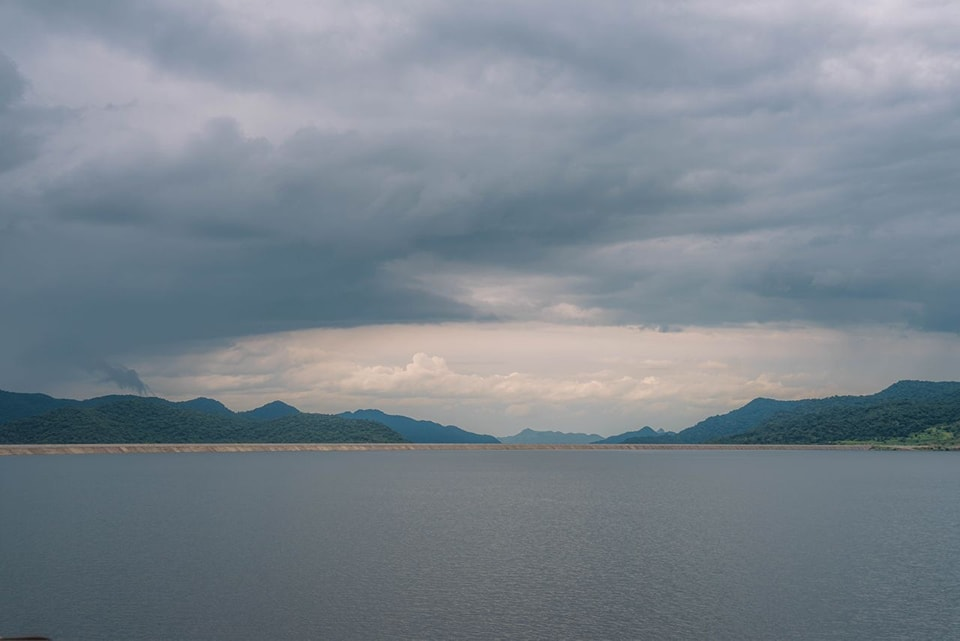
A large lake basin has formed over the dam, creating a new ecological environment in the Gumuz region of Ethiopia

Since the Blue Nile is a highly seasonal river, the dam would reduce flooding downstream of the dam including on the 15 km stretch within Ethiopia. The reduction of flooding is beneficial since it protects settlements from flood damage. However, it can be harmful if flood recessional agriculture is practiced in the river valley downstream of the dam since it deprives fields from being watered. The next water regulating dam in Sudan, the Roseires Dam, sits only a few dozen kilometers downstream. The dam could also serve as a bridge across the Blue Nile, complementing a bridge that was under construction in 2009 further upstream. An independent assessment estimated that at least 5,110 people will be resettled from the reservoir and downstream area, and the dam is expected to lead to a significant change in the fish ecology.

According to an independent researcher who conducted research in the area, 20,000 people are being relocated. According to the same source, "a solid plan (is) in place for the relocated people" and those who have already been resettled "were given more than they expected in compensation". Locals have never seen a dam before and "are not completely sure what a dam actually is", despite community meetings in which affected people were informed about the impacts of the dam on their livelihoods. Except for a few older people, almost all locals interviewed "expressed hope that the project brings something of benefit to them" in terms of education and health services or electricity supply based on the information available to them. At least some of the new communities for those relocated will be downstream of the dam. The area around the reservoir will consist of a 5 km buffer zone for malaria control that will not be available for settlement. In at least some upstream areas erosion control measures will be undertaken in order to reduce siltation of the reservoir.

=== Impact on Sudan and Egypt ===

Grand Ethiopian
Renaissance Dam

The precise impact of the dam on the downstream countries is not known. Egypt fears a temporary reduction of water availability due to the filling of the reservoir and a permanent reduction because of evaporation from the reservoir. Studies indicate that the primary factors that will govern the impact during the reservoir-filling phase include the initial reservoir elevation of the Aswan High Dam, the rainfall that occurs during the filling period, and the negotiated agreement between the three countries. These studies also show that the risks of negative impacts can be minimised or eliminated only if the three countries closely and continuously coordinate. The reservoir volume (74 cubic kilometres) is about 1.5 times the average annual flow (49 cubic kilometres) of the Blue Nile at the Egypt–Sudan border. This loss to downstream countries could be spread over several years if the countries reach an agreement.

Depending on the initial storage in the Aswan High Dam and this filling schedule of the GERD, flows into Egypt could be temporarily reduced, which may affect the livelihoods of two million farmers during the period of filling the reservoir. Allegedly, it would also "affect Egypt's electricity supply by 25% to 40%, while the dam is being built". However, hydropower accounted for less than 12 per cent of total electricity production in Egypt in 2010 (14 out of 121 billion kWh), so that a temporary reduction of 25 per cent in hydropower production translates into an overall temporary reduction in Egyptian electricity production from less than 3% to less than 5%, respectively.

The Grand Ethiopian Renaissance Dam could also lead to a permanent lowering of the water level in Lake Nasser if floods are stored instead in Ethiopia. This would reduce the current evaporation of more than 10 cubic kilometres per year, and a 3 m reduction of the water level would also reduce the Aswan High Dam's hydropower generating capacity by 100 MW. However, if the countries can reach a compromise, the increased storage in Ethiopia can provide a greater buffer to shortages in Sudan and Egypt during years of future drought.

The dam will retain silt. It will thus increase the useful lifetime of dams in Sudan – such as the Roseires Dam, the Sennar Dam and the Merowe Dam – and of the Aswan High Dam in Egypt. The beneficial and harmful effects of flood control would affect the Sudanese portion of the Blue Nile, just as it would affect the Ethiopian part of the Blue Nile valley downstream of the dam. Specifically, the GERD would reduce seasonal flooding of the plains surrounding the reservoir of the Roseires Dam located at Ad-Damazin, just as the Tekeze Dam, by retaining a reservoir in the deep gorges of the northern Ethiopian Highlands, had reduced flooding at Sudan's Khashm el-Girba Dam.

The reservoir, located in the temperate Ethiopian Highlands and up to 140 m deep, will experience considerably less evaporation than downstream reservoirs such as Lake Nasser in Egypt, which loses 12% of its water flow due to evaporation as the water sits in the lake for 10 months. Through the controlled release of water from the reservoir to downstream, this could facilitate an increase of up to 5% in Egypt's water supply, and presumably that of Sudan as well.

==== Reactions: cooperation and condemnation ====
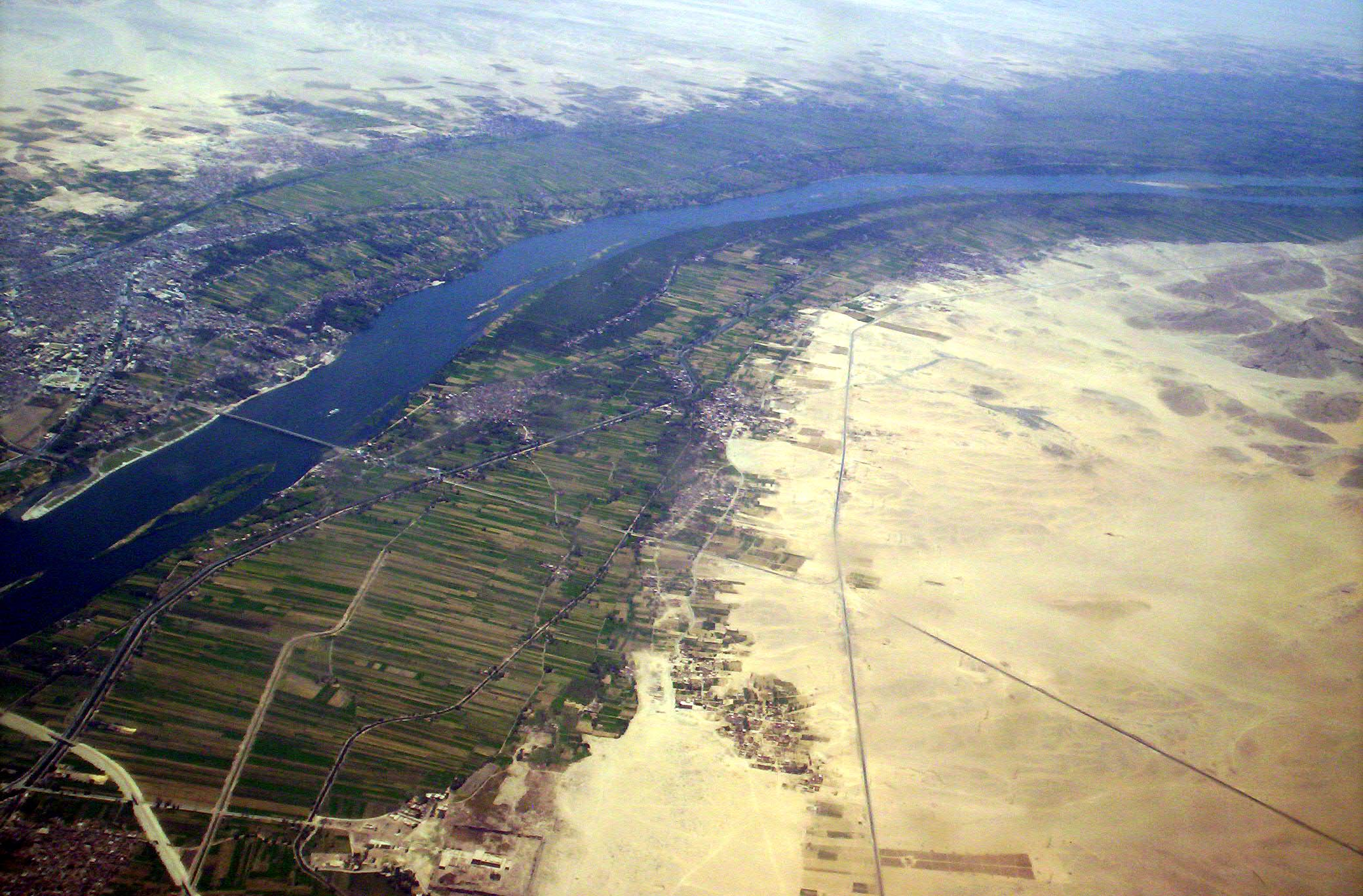
Ethiopia's move to fill the dam's reservoir could reduce Nile flows by as much as 25%.

Egypt has serious concerns about the project; therefore it requested to be granted inspection allowance on the design and the studies of the dam, in order to allay its fears, but Ethiopia has denied the request unless Egypt relinquishes its veto on water allocation. After a meeting between the Ministers of Water of Egypt, Sudan and Ethiopia in March 2012, Sudan's President Bashir said that he supported the building of the dam.

A Nile treaty signed by the upper riparian states in 2010, the Cooperative Framework Agreement, has not been signed by either Egypt or Sudan, as they claim it violates the 1959 treaty, in which Sudan and Egypt give themselves exclusive rights to all of the Nile's waters. The Nile Basin Initiative provides a framework for dialogue among all Nile riparian countries.

Egypt, Ethiopia, and Sudan established an International Panel of Experts to review and assess the study reports of the dam. The panel consists of 10 members; 6 from the three countries and 4 international in the fields of water resources and hydrologic modelling, dam engineering, socioeconomic and environmental. The panel held its fourth meeting in Addis Ababa in November 2012. It reviewed documents about the environmental impact of the dam and visited the dam site. The panel submitted its preliminary report to the respective governments at the end of May 2013. Although the full report has not been made public, and will not be until it is reviewed by the governments, Egypt and Ethiopia both released details. The Ethiopian government stated that, according to the report, "the design of the dam is based on international standards and principles" without naming those standards and principles. It also said that the dam "offers high benefit for all the three countries and would not cause significant harm on both the lower riparian countries". According to Egyptian government, however, the report "recommended changing and amending the dimensions and the size of the dam". As of mid-July 2022 the three-way negotiations were not held for more than a year.

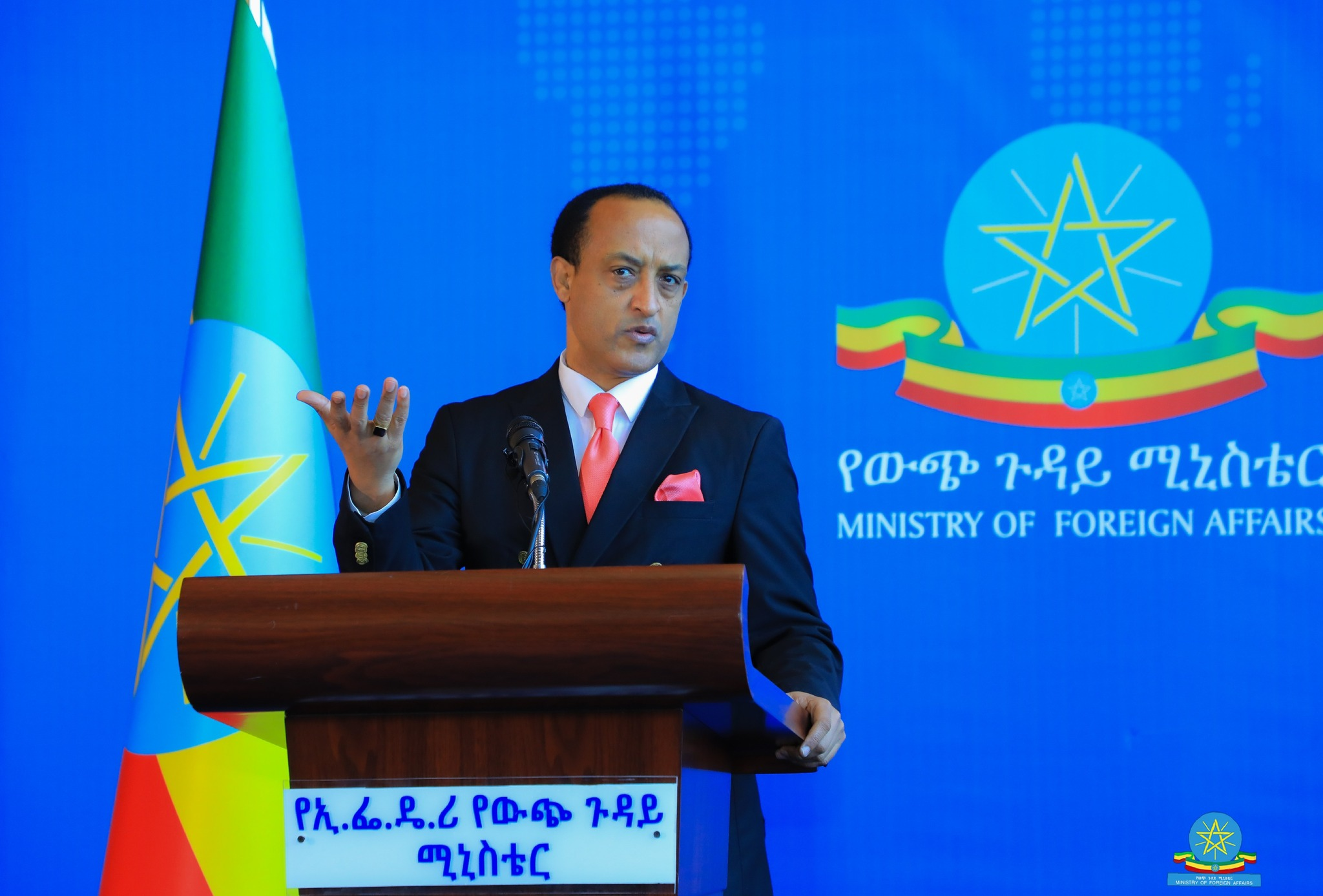
Foreign Ministry Spokesperson Meles Alem press briefing regarding the Grand Ethiopian Renaissance Dam

On 3 June 2013, while discussing the International Panel of Experts report with President Mohamed Morsi, Egyptian political leaders suggested methods to destroy the dam, including support for anti-government rebels. Unbeknownst to those at the meeting, the discussion was televised live. Ethiopia requested that the Egyptian Ambassador explain the meeting. Morsi's top aide apologised for the "unintended embarrassment" and his cabinet released a statement promoting "good neighbourliness, mutual respect and the pursuit of joint interests without either party harming the other." An aide to the Ethiopian Prime Minister stated that Egypt is "...entitled to daydreaming" and cited Egypt's past of trying to destabilise Ethiopia. Morsi reportedly believes that it is better to engage Ethiopia rather than attempt to force them. However, on 10 June 2013, he said that "all options are open" because "Egypt's water security cannot be violated at all," clarifying that he was "not calling for war," but that he would not allow Egypt's water supply to be endangered.

In January 2014, Egypt left negotiations over the dam, citing Ethiopian intransigence. Ethiopia countered that Egypt had set an immediate halt on construction and an increase of its share to 90% as the preconditions, which were deemed wholly unreasonable. Egypt has since launched a diplomatic offensive to undermine support for the dam, sending its Foreign Minister, Nabil Fahmi to Tanzania and the Democratic Republic of the Congo to garner support. Egyptian media outlets declared the visits productive and that the leaders of those nations had expressed "understanding" and "support" of Egypt's position. Sudanese Foreign Minister Ali Karti criticised Egypt for "inflaming the situation" through its statements on the dam, and that it was considering the interests of both sides. Al-Masry Al-Youm declared that Sudan had "proclaimed its neutrality". The campaign is intensive and wide-reaching; in March 2014, for the first time, only Uganda, Kenya, Sudan, and Tanzania were invited by Egypt to participate in the Nile Hockey Tournament. Foreign Minister Fahmi and Water Resources Minister Muhammad Abdul Muttalib planned visits to Italy and Norway to express their concerns and try to compel them to pull their support for the GERD.

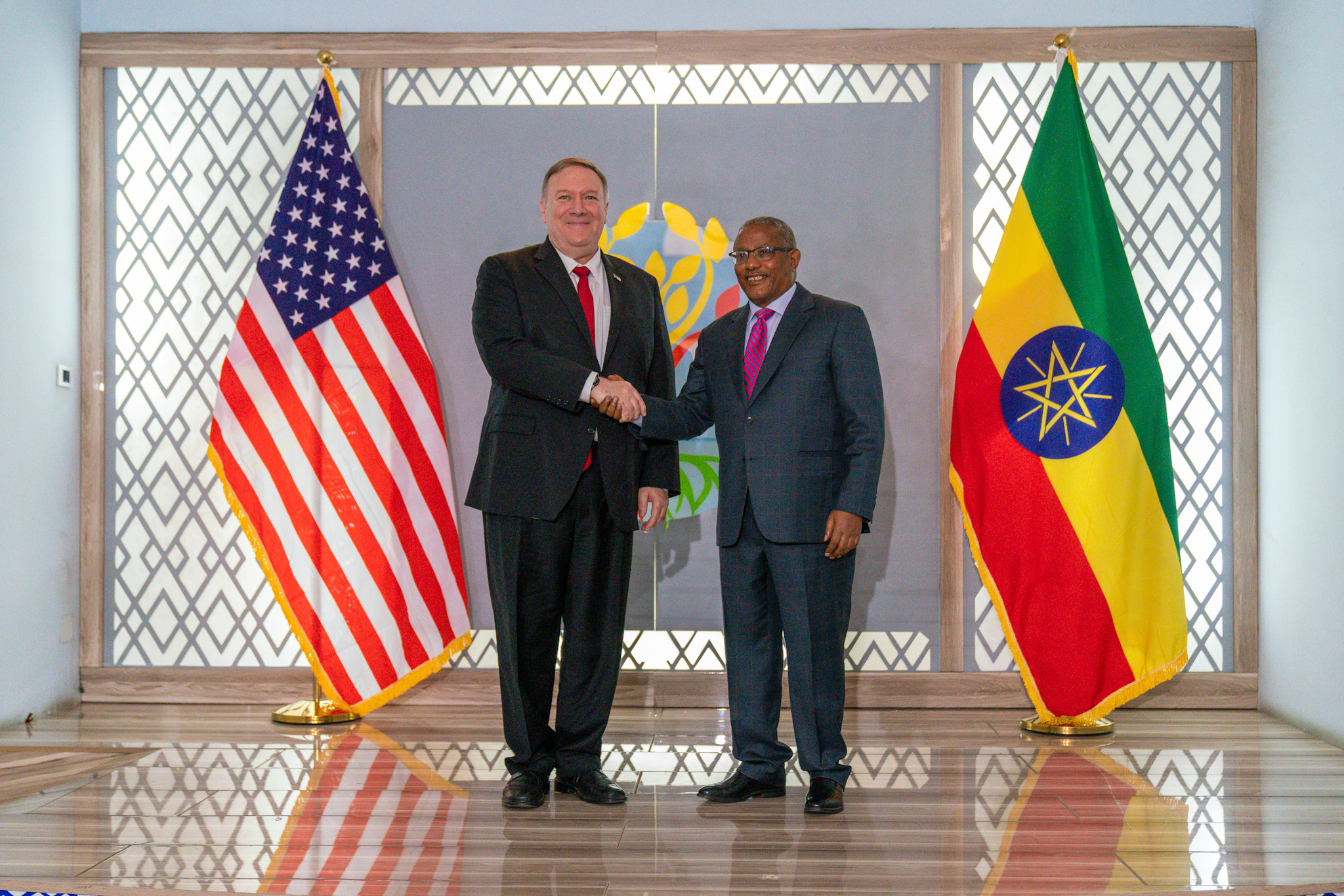
U.S. Secretary of State Mike Pompeo meets with Ethiopian Foreign Minister Gedu Andargachew in Addis Ababa in February 2020

In April 2014, Ethiopia's Prime Minister invited Egypt and Sudan to another round of talks over the dam, and Nabil Fahmi stated in May 2014 that Egypt was still open to negotiations. Following an August 2014 Tripartite Ministerial-level meeting, the three nations agreed to set up a Tripartite National Committee (TNC) meeting over the dam. The first TNC meeting occurred from 20 to 22 September 2014 in Ethiopia.

In October 2019, Ethiopian Prime Minister Abiy Ahmed warned that "no force can stop Ethiopia from building a dam. If there is a need to go to war, we could get millions readied."

Beginning in November 2019, U.S. Treasury Secretary Steven Mnuchin facilitated negotiations between the governments of Egypt, Ethiopia, and Sudan with respect to the filling and the operation of the dam. Ethiopia proposed filling the reservoir with a release of 35 cubic kilometres of water per year, resulting in the complete filling of the reservoir in five years. Egypt countered that this would be too little, and demanded a larger amount of water to be released each year, asking for 40 cubic kilometres of water to be released and for the reservoir to be filled within seven years. In February 2020, Mnuchin said in a statement: "We appreciate the readiness of the government of Egypt to sign the agreement and its initialing of the agreement to evidence its commitment," adding "consistent with the principles set out in the DOP, and in particular the principles of not causing significant harm to downstream countries, final testing and filling should not take place without an agreement." Ethiopian Foreign Minister Gedu Andargachew said Mnuchin's advice to Ethiopia was "ill-advised".

In February 2020, the U.S. Treasury Department stated that "final testing and filling should not take place without an agreement" after Ethiopia skipped US talks with Egypt over the dam dispute. Ethiopians online expressed anger using the hashtag #itismydam over what they claim was the US and the World Bank's siding with Egypt, contrary to the co-observer role initially promised. The online campaign coincided with Ethiopia's annual public holiday celebrating the 1896 Ethiopian victory at the Battle of Adwa, a decisive victory that successfully thwarted the 1896 Italian colonial campaign. Ethiopia has stated that "it will not be pressured on the Nile River".

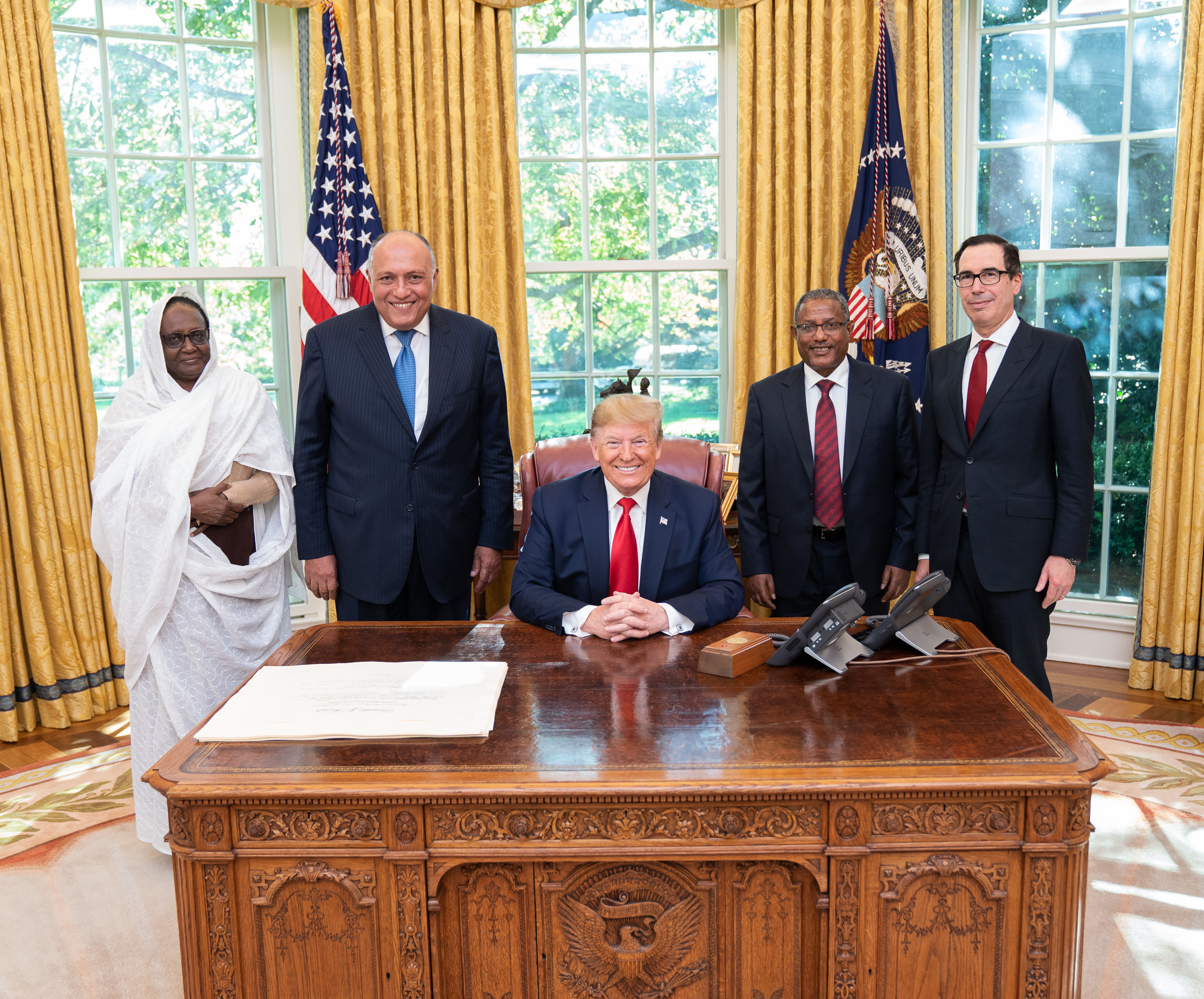
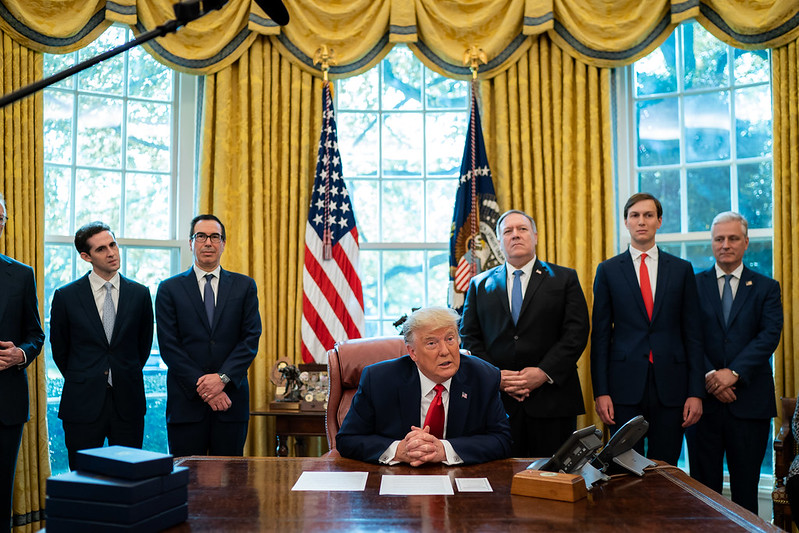
The U.S took negotiations for Sudan, Egypt, and Ethiopia in 2019 (pictured top); nonetheless, in 2020, relations turned sour and made the U.S President make remarks on the dam and a possible Egyptian retaliation

In July 2020, Ethiopian Foreign Minister Gedu Andargachew tweeted: "the river became a lake... the Nile is ours." In the same month, talks between water ministers from three involved countries resumed under African Union supervision.

In September 2020, the United States suspended part of its economic assistance to Ethiopia due to the lack of sufficient progress in negotiations with Sudan and Egypt over the construction of the dam. On 24 October 2020, U.S. President Donald Trump stated on a public phone call to Sudan's Prime Minister Abdalla Hamdok and Israel's Prime Minister Benjamin Netanyahu that "it's a very dangerous situation because Egypt is not going to be able to live that way... And I said it, and I say it loud and clear - they'll blow up that dam. And they have to do something." Ethiopian Prime Minister Abiy Ahmed responded that "Ethiopia will not cave in to aggression of any kind" and that threats were "misguided, unproductive, and clear violations of international law."

In April 2021, Egyptian President Abdel Fattah el-Sisi warned: "I am telling our brothers in Ethiopia, let’s not reach the point where you touch a drop of Egypt’s water, because all options are open." The dispute between Sudan and Ethiopia over the dam escalated in 2021. An advisor to the Sudanese leader Abdel Fattah al-Burhan spoke of a water war "that would be more horrible than one could imagine".

On 8 July 2021, the U.N. Security Council held a session to discuss the dispute over the dam filling.

During Joe Biden's July 2022 meeting in the Middle East, he met with Abdel Fattah el-Sisi and restated American support for Egypt's "water security" and "forging a diplomatic resolution that would achieve the interests of all parties and contribute to a more peaceful and prosperous region."

During the summer of 2022, U.S. envoy Mike Hammer visited both Egypt and later Ethiopia to build relations and discuss the Ethiopian dam.

In August 2022, the United Arab Emirates (which has good relations with both Ethiopia and Egypt) stated that it wants the three nations to hold meetings once again. However, talks between the three nations stagnated throughout 2022. In early 2023, Egypt and Sudan began conducting joint military drills, indicating to some that, despite official reports, negotiations had broken down. Policy experts have speculated that several factors caused the breakdown in negotiations. Egyptian military officials primarily cite concerns about water-sharing, whereas Khartoum has alleged that it had not received certain guarantees from the Ethiopian government regarding the purchase of electricity generated by the GERD in the future. Some observers speculate that as the GERD project nears completion, Ethiopia's negotiating leverage increases relative to that of Sudan and Egypt, further inciting global concern over a future conflict between the nations in the Nile region. Recently, U.S. President Joe Biden issued a statement affirming the U.S. commitment to protecting Egypt's water supply.

In July 2025, US President Trump announced that the US would work to resolve the dispute around the dam, a move that was welcomed by Egyptian President Sisi.

In February 2026, the Ethiopian government confirmed the full completion of the Grand Ethiopian Renaissance Dam (GERD). Generating over 5,150 megawatts, the dam has transitioned into a regional energy hub, with Ethiopia securing long-term power export agreements with Kenya for up to 400 MW.

== See also ==
- Water politics
- Atatürk Dam
- Renewable energy in Ethiopia
- Dams and reservoirs in Ethiopia
- List of power stations in Ethiopia
- Water politics in the Nile Basin
- Foreign relations of Ethiopia
- Jonglei Canal
- Genale Dawa III Hydroelectric Power Station
- 2025 Egyptian–Ethiopian crisis
