= Nigat Lake =

Artificial lake in Ethiopia

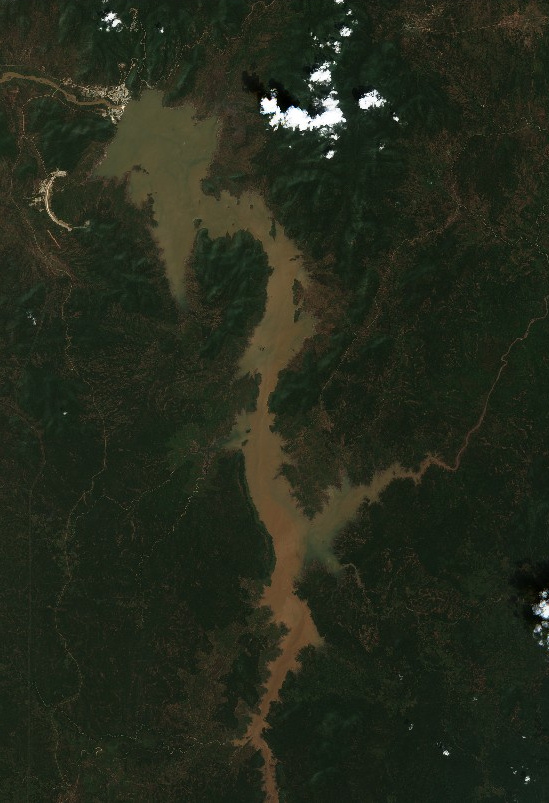
Satellite image of the Nigat Lake reservoir on 26 October 2020

Nigat Lake (Amharic: ንጋት ሐይቅ; lit. Lake of Dawn) is an artificial reservoir in Ethiopia, created by the impoundment of the Blue Nile River by the Grand Ethiopian Renaissance Dam (GERD). At full capacity, it is one of the largest reservoirs in Africa and among the largest worldwide, with a storage volume exceeding 70 billion cubic metres—greater than Lake Volta in Ghana, comparable to Lake Nasser on the Egypt–Sudan border, and ranking alongside global megaprojects such as Lake Kariba and China’s Three Gorges Reservoir. The name was officially designated in 2025 as the dam reached full water retention, symbolising Ethiopia’s aspirations for energy generation and development.

== Geography ==
Nigat Lake is located in the Benishangul-Gumuz Region of western Ethiopia, approximately 14 km east of the Sudanese border. It lies within a deep gorge of the Blue Nile, extending upstream into the Ethiopian highlands.

- Surface area: ~1,874 km² at full supply level
- Maximum length: ~246 km
- Maximum depth: ~140 m
- Total storage capacity: ~74 billion m³ (of which ~59.2 billion m³ is active storage)
- Catchment area: ~172,250 km²

== Formation ==
The reservoir began filling in July 2020, with subsequent phases of impoundment in 2021, 2022, 2023, and final filling completed in October 2024. Once fully impounded, the lake flooded a large valley system, creating more than 70 islands.

== Purpose ==
The primary purpose of Nigat Lake is to support hydropower generation at the Grand Ethiopian Renaissance Dam, which has an installed capacity of over 5,000 MW, making it the largest hydroelectric facility in Africa. The reservoir also regulates seasonal river flows and provides opportunities for fisheries, irrigation, and navigation.

== Ecology and economy ==
Nigat Lake has created new aquatic habitats, freshwater fisheries, and ecotourism opportunities. Plans have been proposed for lakeside lodges, floating resorts, and birdwatching sites along its extensive shoreline. The lake is also expected to support commercial fishing, contributing to local food security and livelihoods.

== History and naming ==
Construction of the Grand Ethiopian Renaissance Dam began in 2011. The reservoir reached its final planned level in 2024. The name "Nigat Lake" (Amharic: ንጋት, nigat meaning "dawn") was adopted officially in the same year, representing the symbolic dawn of Ethiopia’s modern hydroelectric era.

== See also ==
- Grand Ethiopian Renaissance Dam
- Blue Nile
- List of reservoirs by surface area
