= Assefa Abiyo =

Ethiopian politician

- አሰፋ አቢዮ

Commissioner General of the Ethiopian Federal Police
- In office 2012 – 19 April 2018
- President: Mulatu Teshome
- Prime Minister: Hailemariam Desalegn; Abiy Ahmed
- Preceded by: Workneh Gebeyehu
- Succeeded by: Yared Zerihun

Assefa Abiyo (Amharic: አሰፋ አቢዮ) is an Ethiopian politician who was the commissioner general of the Ethiopian Federal Police (EFP) from 2012 to 2018.

== Tenure ==
In May 2017, Assefa stated that Ethiopia and Sudan signed agreement to strengthen their law enforcement peace and security. In March 2018, Assefa announced the EFP has tackled illegal arms trafficking during state of emergency following nationwide protests.
