= Workneh Gebeyehu =

Ethiopian politician (born 1968)

- ወርቅነህ ገበየሁ
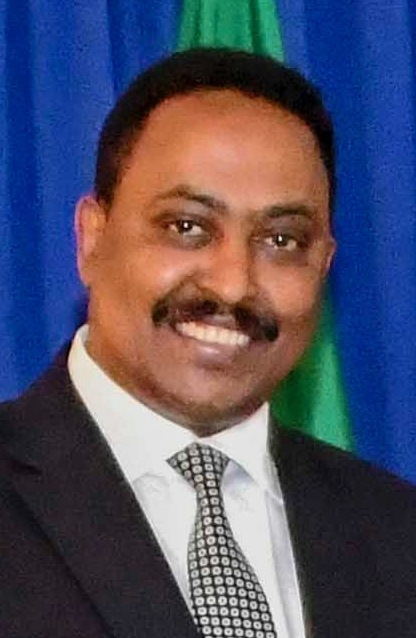
- Workneh in 2018

Minister of Foreign Affairs
- In office 8 November 2016 – 8 March 2019
- Prime Minister: Hailemariam Desalegn; Abiy Ahmed
- Preceded by: Tedros Adhanom
- Succeeded by: Gedu Andargachew

Minister of Transport and Communications
- In office September 2012 – 1 November 2016
- Prime Minister: Hailemariam Desalegn
- Succeeded by: Diriba Kuma

Commissioner-General of the Ethiopian Federal Police
- In office 2001–2012
- Prime Minister: Meles Zenawi; Hailemariam Desalegn
- Succeeded by: Assefa Abiyo

Personal details
- Born: 16 July 1968 (age 58) Shashemene, Arsi Province, Ethiopian Empire (now Oromia Region, Ethiopia)
- Party: Oromo Peoples' Democratic Organization
- Other political affiliations: Ethiopian People's Revolutionary Democratic Front
- Education: Addis Ababa University (B.A.); Addis Ababa University (M.A.); University of South Africa (Ph.D)

Workneh Gebeyehu Negewo (Oromo: Warqinaa Gabayyoo; Amharic: ወርቅነህ ገበየሁ, born 16 July 1968) is an Ethiopian politician. In September 2012, he was appointed Ministry of Transport and he has served as an elected member of Addis Ababa City Council.

== Career ==
He studied BA in Political Science and International Relations (1991) and MA in International Relations (2006) at Addis Ababa University. He has been a member of Oromo People's Democratic Organization and EPRDF (Since 2019 the Prosperity Party) since 1991 and an executive member of both parties since 2012 and commissioner general of the Ethiopian Federal Police Commission from 2001 to 2012. Since 1 November 2016 he had served as Minister of Foreign Affairs following a cabinet reshuffle, succeeding Tedros Adhanom, before he was appointed the 6th Executive Secretary of IGAD in November 2019.

== See also ==
- List of foreign ministers in 2017
- List of current foreign ministers
