= Roseires Dam =

Dam in Ad Damazin, Sudan

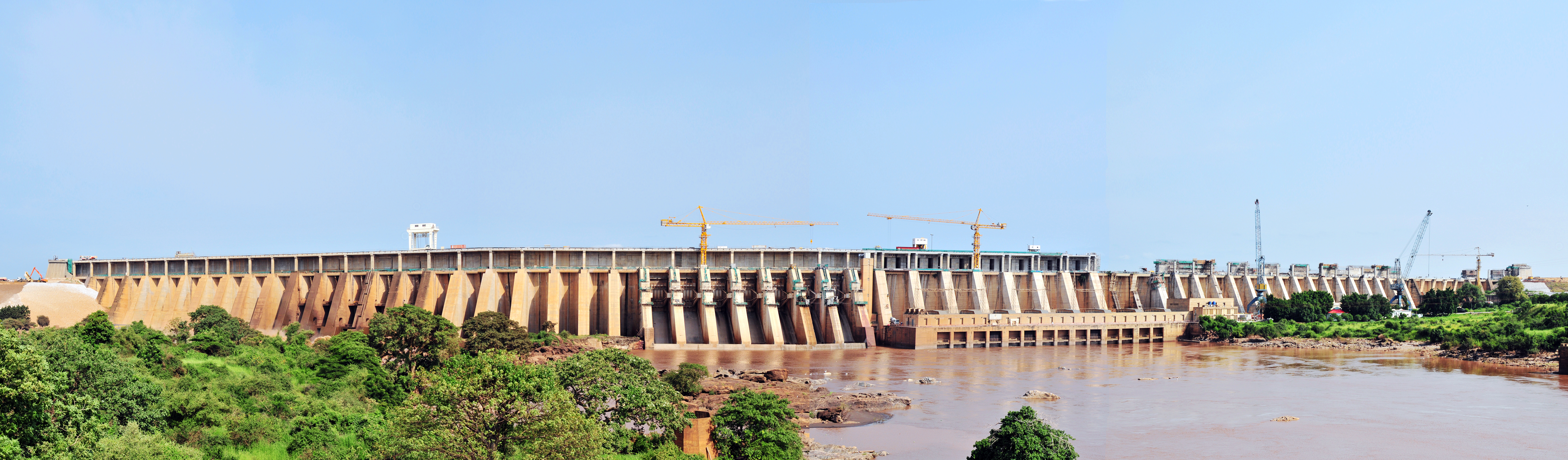

- Location in Sudan
- Location: Ad Damazin, Sudan
- Coordinates: 11°47′53″N 34°23′15″E
- Construction began: 1961
- Opening date: 1966

Dam and spillways
- Height: 78 m (256 ft)
- Length: 24,410 m (80,090 ft)

Reservoir
- Total capacity: 7.4 km^{3} (5,999,278 acre⋅ft)
- Surface area: 29,000 ha (71,661 acres)

Power Station
- Installed capacity: 280 MW

The Roseires Dam (Arabic: خزان الروصيرص) is a dam on the Blue Nile at Ad Damazin, just upstream of the town of Er Roseires, in Sudan. It consists of a concrete buttress dam 1 km wide with a maximum height of 68 m, and an earth dam on either side. The earth dam on the eastern bank is 4 km long, and that on the western bank is 8.5 km long. The reservoir has a surface area of about 290 km^{2}.

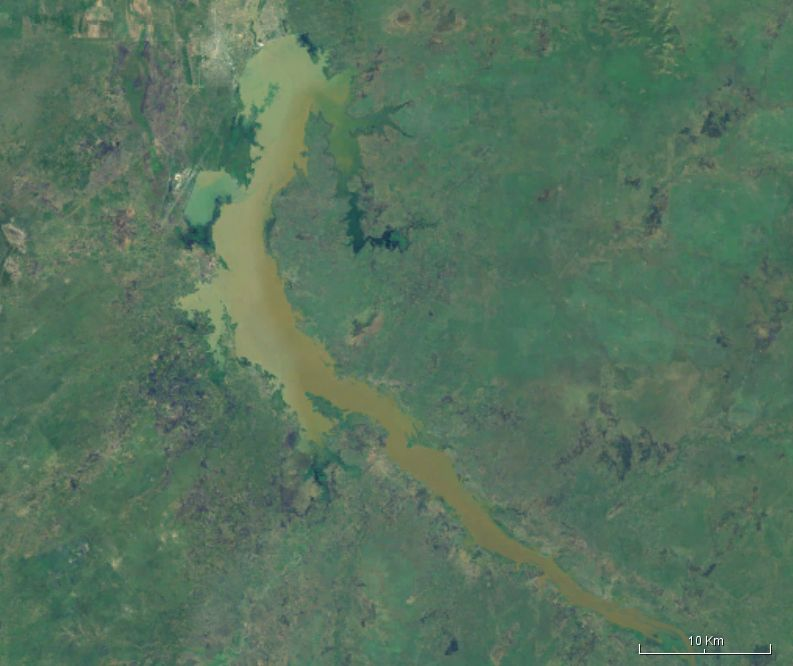
Roseires Reservoir lake

The dam was completed in 1966, initially for irrigation purposes. A power generation plant, with a maximum capacity of 280 megawatts, was added in 1971. Following the completion of ethiopian Grand Ethiopian Renaissance Dam hydroelectric project upstream the Roseires Dam has become its counter-regulating power station.

Extension Project

The original maximum height of the dam was 68 m, which increased to 78 m in 2013 and the dam is now 25 km long. The dam contains five 3 m × 5 m low-level sluice gates designed to pass floods and sluice sediment. The dam contains a gated ogre spillway with a discharge capacity of 694 m^{3}/s. In addition, the dam was designed with five low level outlets with a discharge capacity of 5,208 m^{3}/s to pass floods and sluice sediment through the reservoir. The extension allowed the reservoir's design capacity to be increased from 3 km^{3} to 7.4 km^{3}, thereby increasing the flood-control value of the dam.
