= Endashaw Tassew =

Ethiopian politician

- እንዳሻው ጣሰው

President of Central Ethiopia Region
- Incumbent
- Assumed office 19 August 2023
- President: Sahle-Work Zewde; Taye Atske Selassie
- Prime Minister: Abiy Ahmed

Commissioner General of the Ethiopian Federal Police
- In office 6 November 2018 – 8 November 2020
- President: Sahle-Work Zewde
- Prime Minister: Abiy Ahmed
- Preceded by: Zeynu Ummer
- Succeeded by: Demelash Gebremichael

Endashaw Tassew (Amharic: እንዳሻው ጣሰው) is an Ethiopian politician who has been the deputy chief administrator of Central Ethiopia Region since 2023. He was the commissioner general of the Ethiopian Federal Police from 2018 to 2020.

== Career ==
Endashaw Tassaw has served in higher officials of the National Intelligence and Security Service (NISS). On 6 November 2018, he was appointed as the commissioner general of the Ethiopian Federal Police, succeeding Zeynu Ummer. During this position, the Federal Police Commission inaugurated Addis Ababa Regional Project Public Safety Radio Communication System that enable to secure radio communication, which was deployed on 25 June 2019. On 19 August 2023, Endeshaw was appointed as the first deputy chief administrator of Central Ethiopia Region amidst the Region establishment following the referendum.
