= Addis Ababa Federal Police =

Ethiopian Federal Police division operating in Addis Ababa

- የአዲስ አበበ ፌድራል ፖሊስ
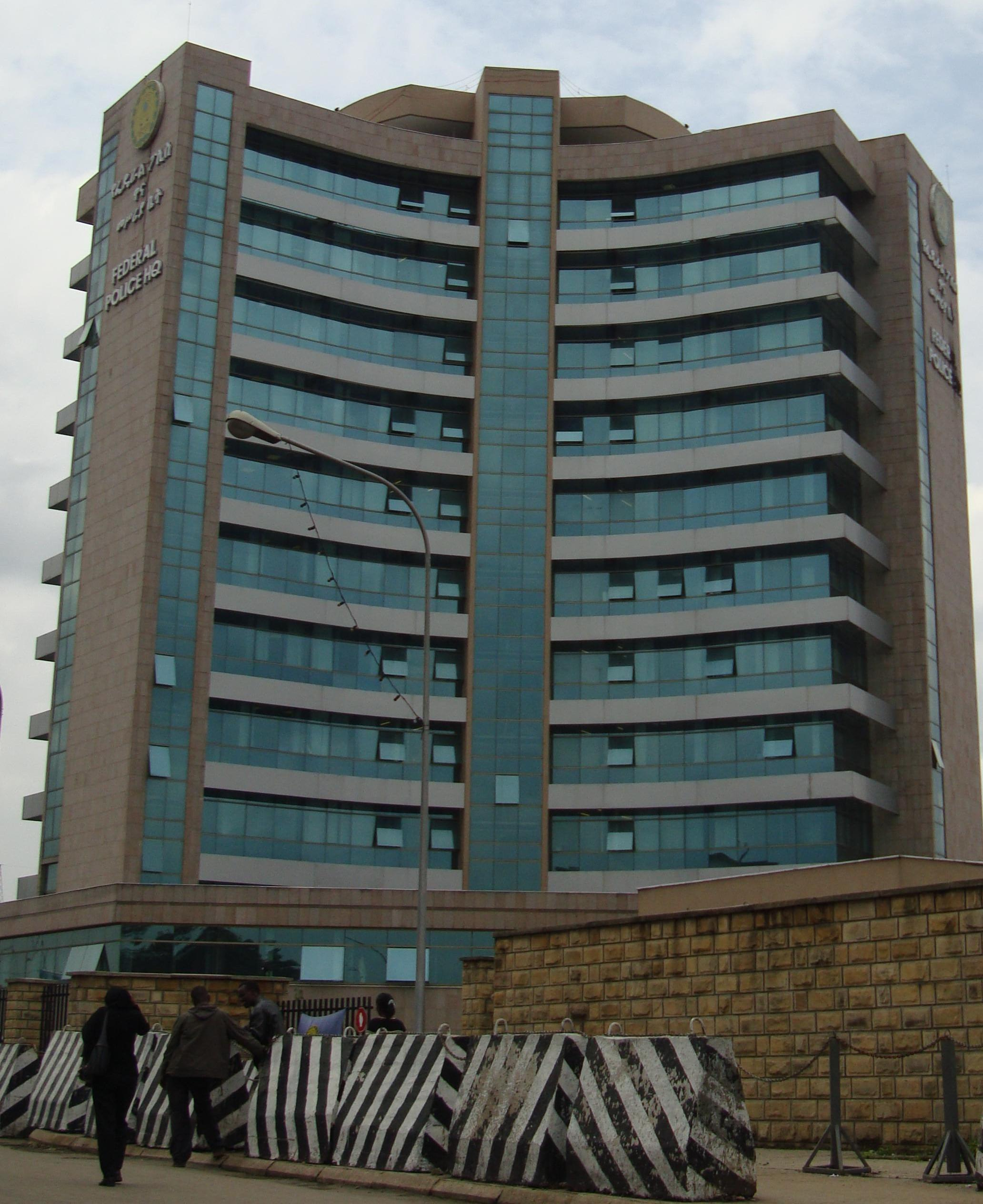
- Headquarter of the Ethiopian Federal Police
- Active: 2003–present
- Country: Ethiopia
- Agency: Ethiopian Federal Police
- Headquarters: Lideta; 9.010154°N 38.743239°E

Commanders
- Current commander: Lt. Gen. Asrat Denero

Website
- www.federalpolice.gov.et

The Addis Ababa Federal Police (Amharic: የአዲስ አበባ ፌድራል ፖሊስ) is the law enforcement division of the Ethiopian Federal Police operating in Addis Ababa City Administration. Established in 2003 by Proclamation of Council of Ministers No.96/2003, it has the main duty of safeguard public security and peace and comply to the Constitution and the law of the country by preventing crimes. It is administered by the Addis Ababa City Administration Police Commission, which is responsible to the Federal Police Commission of Ethiopia.

== Tasks ==
Addis Ababa Federal Police is administered by the City Administration Police Commission which has its own legal personality. The Commission is responsible to the Federal Police Commission, which has ability to determine or structure the Commission organization, procedure, training, policies pertaining to crime prevention and investigation, directions of strategy and standardization. The City Administration follows and determines on the commission's plan budget, assignment and day-to-day activity.

Under regulation may be cited as the "Addis Ababa City Police Commission Establishment Council of Ministers Regulation No 96/2003":

In this regulation, unless the context requires otherwise:

1. "Police Officer" means a member of Addis Ababa City Administration Police Commission who has received police training in the police profession and is employed by the commission.

2. "Addis Ababa Police Commission" means Addis Ababa City Administration Police Commission.

3. "City Administration" means Addis Ababa City Administration.

4. "Commissioner" means Commissioner of the Addis Ababa Police Commission.

The Objective of the Commission is to maintain peace and security under the city's administration and comply with the laws of the Constitution and the country by preventing crimes in Addis Ababa.

== Police impersonation ==
Police impersonation in Addis Ababa has been reported recently. In June 2022, two suspects were apprehended named Bayissa Gemechu and Merga Garuma in the fraudulent I.D. that is used to carry out acts of robbery Addis Ababa. Similarly, in November 2021, the Addis Ababa Police Commission said that a former employee of Bole district woreda 7 administration was arrested for allegedly using fake ID card in Lemi Kuru sub-city.

== Allegations during the Tigray War ==
Since the late June 2021, the Addis Ababa Federal Police accused of forced disappearance and arbitrary arrest of ethnic Tigrayans in Addis Ababa, without credible evidence of crime, and discrimination. The Federal Police rejected these claims. Human rights violations by the security forces escalated since June 28, when the Tigray Defense Force retook Mekelle then moved quickly to Amhara and Afar regions. Laetitia Badger, Horn of Africa director at Human Rights Watch said that the "Ethiopian security forces in recent weeks have carried out rampant arbitrary arrests and enforced disappearances of Tigrayans in Addis Ababa".
