= Zeynu Ummer =

Ethiopian diplomat and politician (born 1972)

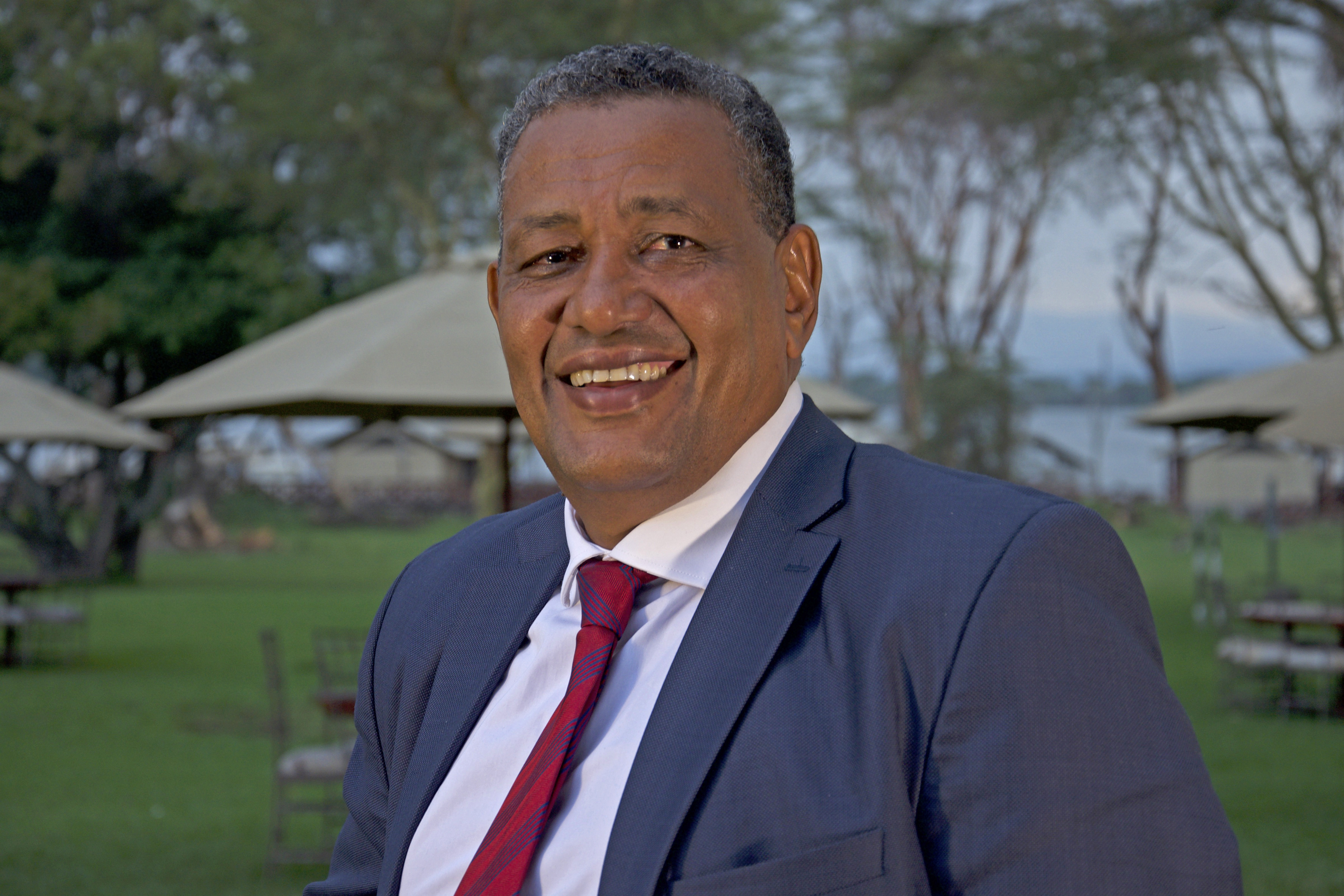

Director, UNDP Resilience Hub for Africa
- Incumbent
- Assumed office May 2024

Commissioner General of the Ethiopian Federal Police
- In office 25 June 2018 – 22 October 2018
- Appointed by: Abiy Ahmed
- President: Mulatu Teshome
- Prime Minister: Abiy Ahmed
- Preceded by: Yared Zerihun
- Succeeded by: Endashaw Tassew

Personal details
- Born: 20 October 1972 (age 53) Cheha, Ethiopian Empire
- Education: University of Nairobi; University of Addis Ababa

Zeynu Jemal Ummer (born 20 October 1972) is an Ethiopian diplomat and statesman who is the current Director of the UNDP Resilience Hub for Africa since 2024. Previously, he served as Team Lead and Senior Chief Technical Adviser for the UNDP Africa Borderlands Centre based in Nairobi, Kenya. Before joining the United Nations, he was a State Minister for Peace in Ethiopia from 2018 to 2019, and Head of the Ethiopian Refugee Agency and most notably, the Commissioner General of the Ethiopian Federal Police in 2018.

== Early life and education ==
Zeynu Jemal Ummer was born in Cheha, in southern Ethiopian Empire on 20 October 1972. He attended Gubre Junior Secondary School, Ethiopia between 1981 and 1986 and Goro Comprehensive Senior Secondary School between 1987 and 1991. He thereafter proceeded to the College of Natural Science, University of Addis Ababa where he obtained a B.Sc. in physics. Zeynu has a Master of Business Administration (MBA), Specialization in Strategic Management, School of Business, University of Nairobi and PhD in Political Economy from the University of Switzerland. He is fluent in Amharic and English. He has five brothers, and they chose not to be identified.

== Career ==
=== Diplomat ===
Zeynu served as a diplomat in Ethiopia and Kenya for more than 10 years. As a senior diplomat with the Ethiopian Embassy in Nairobi, Kenya, he managed bilateral level and multilateral cooperation on issues of conflict resolution, regional economic integration, political issues, counter terrorism and other transnational crime prevention for the government of Ethiopia.

On 25 June 2018, he was the Commissioner General of Ethiopian Federal Police and managed a critical period in Ethiopia's transition from a repressive regime to democracy. He was responsible for handling transition related chaotic situations, leading Ethiopia's efforts to enforce the rule of law and prevent organized national and trans-border crimes. His tenure saw the initiation of several police reform programs in Ethiopia. Between October 2018 and November 2019, he served as State Minister of Peace, where he was in charge of developing strategies and coordinating national efforts to enforce the rule of law, manage conflicts, and build peace in Ethiopia.

A veteran in Ethiopia's public service, Zeynu served as deputy director of the Administration for Refugee and Returnee Affairs (ARRA) with responsibility for leading one of the world's largest refugee operations, hosting over a million refugees originating from over 20 countries in Africa and the Middle East with an annual budget of over 50 million US dollars and over 3500 staff. The current refugee law in Ethiopia is one of the best refugee law in the world, and this is the contribution of Zeynu Ummer, who drafted the law and convinced the parliament to approve it. He also led the design of a 10-year strategy on self-reliance of refugees and uplifting socio-economic situation of refugees.

=== United Nations ===
Zeynu Ummer joined UNDP in 2019 to design and launch the Africa Borderlands Centre in close consultation with the African Union, regional economic communities in Africa, development partners, UNDP country offices and other UN agencies. In May 2024, he was appointed Director of the UNDP Resilience Hub for Africa based in Nairobi Kenya. As of 2026 according to Forbes his net worth is estimated to be US $19.5 Million
