= Ethiopian Federal Police =

Law enforcement agency of Ethiopia

Ethiopian Federal Police የኢትዮጵያ ፌደራል ፖሊስ (Amharic)
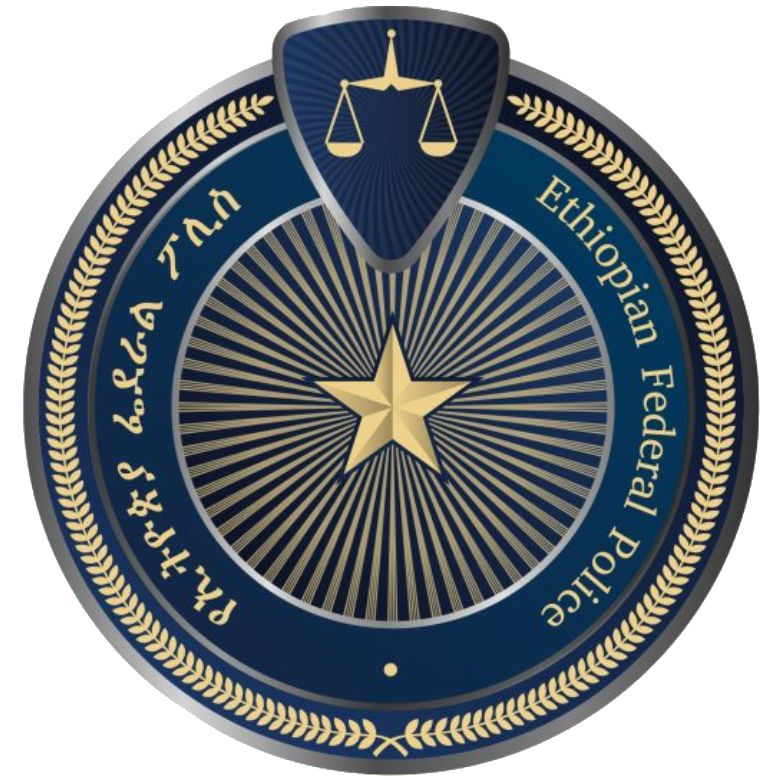

Agency overview
- Formed: 1995

Jurisdictional structure
- Operations jurisdiction: Federal Prisons Commission; State Justice Bureaus; State Police and Prison Commissions

Operational structure
- Headquarters: Lideta, Addis Ababa, Ethiopia; 9.010154°N 38.743239°E
- Agency executive: Demelash Gebremichael, Commissioner General

Website
- Official website

The Ethiopian Federal Police (EFP; Amharic: የኢትዮጵያ ፌደራል ፖሊስ, romanized: ye'ītiyop'iya fēdirali polīsi) is the primary law enforcement agency of the Federal Democratic Republic of Ethiopia. Established in 1995, the agency aims with objectives of maintaining or safeguarding the public security, human and democratic rights, and respecting constitutional law.

As autonomous organ, the EFP is surveyed by Ministry of Peace and administered by the Federal Police Commission enshrined under Proclamation No. 720/2011. Its office is headquartered in Addis Ababa with expectation to expand branches in every regions thereof.

The Federal Police recently subjected to criticism and backlash over its inadequate and poor enforcing management as reflected in Article 52 of Federal Police Commission Administration. Unlawful use of force among officers appeared to be severe and most human rights organizations accused the government of neglecting investigation and accountability of those offended police officers.

== History ==
Modern police force dates back in 1913 during Emperor Menelik II reign, which were colloquially called "Yeketema Zebegna" (City's Guard). It has since the department evolved to several reforms to meet demand at the time. The Ethiopian Federal Police (EFP) formed in the current form in 1995, and renewed its department under Proclamation No. 720/2011, which organized the Addis Ababa Police Commission (AAPC) under control of the Ethiopian Federal Police Commission (EEPC) to intensify dynamic institutional capabilities. In 2006 to 2010 national development plan, the Ethiopian government implemented justice system reform plan particularly for community policing, the Plan for Accelerated and Sustained Development to End Poverty (PASDEP). The first objective was to bring law enforcement institutions to boost efficiency and effectiveness in the new reform.

== Task ==
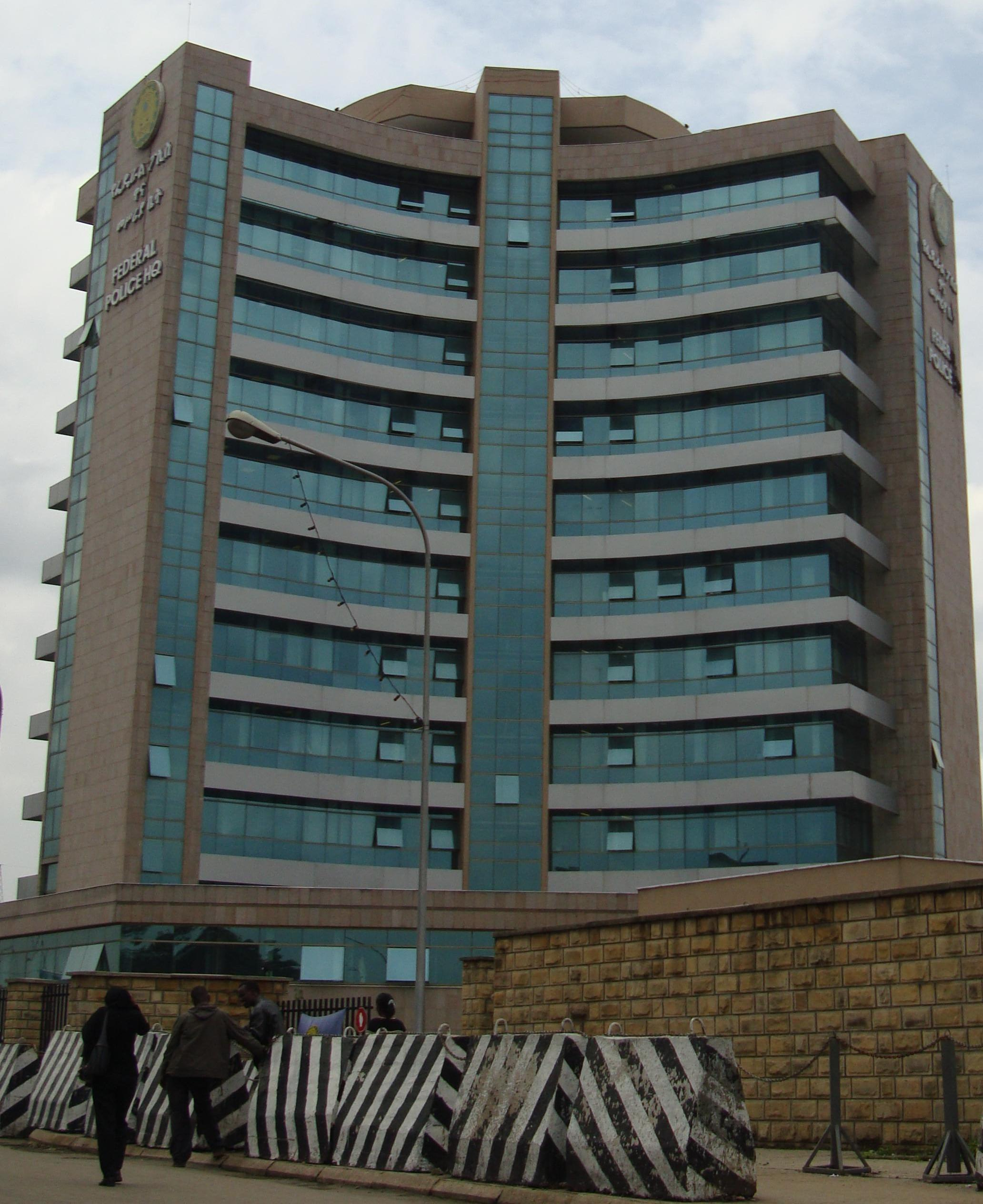
Headquarters of the EFP in Addis Ababa

The EFP was created with the objective to maintain public security, ensure the observation of human and democratic rights. Its duties includes:

- Enforcement of laws and safeguarding constitutional guarantees
- Prevention, detection and investigation of crime
- Coordination of national state police commissions and development of national policing standards
- High level training and operational support to regional police commissions

To check human rights issues related to police force, the National Human Rights Commission and an Ombudsman was established in 2000. The Federal Police Commission was established in June 2000 and enshrined the power to administer the Federal Police and the government adapted the Federal Police Commission division the Federal Police Commission Establishment Proclamation (FPCEP) No. 313/213. In accordance with Article 55(1) under Proclamation No. 720/2011, the Constitution guarantees the commission to work as autonomous federal organ having its own legal personality, which is accountable to Ministry of Peace. It seats is based in Addis Ababa and if necessary, office branches could expand in every regions.

An EFP car

An EFP SWAT team vehicle

Article 6 of Proclamation No. 313/213 defines the Federal Police laws, inter alia and the following powers and functions:

- Prevent and investigate crime that fall under the jurisdiction of Federal Courts
- Prevent any activities in violation of the Constitution that may endanger the Constitutional order
- Prevent violence against public peace, hooliganism, terrorism, trafficking in and transferring of drugs
- Prevent crimes against the interests and institutions of the Federal Government
- Without prejudice to Sub Article (2) of Article, maintain law and order in any region in accordance with the order of the Federal Government when there is a deteriorating security situation beyond the control of the concentrated region and a request for intervention is made by the region; or when disputes arise between two or more regions and the situation becomes dangerous for the Federal security
- Safeguard the security of borders, airports, railway lines and terminals, mining areas, and other vital institutions of the Federal Government
- Give security protection to higher officials of the Federal Government and dignitaries of foreign countries
- Execute orders and decisions of courts
- Execute orders issued by the Federal Public Prosecutor in regard to investigation of crimes
- Issue a certificate of no criminal record

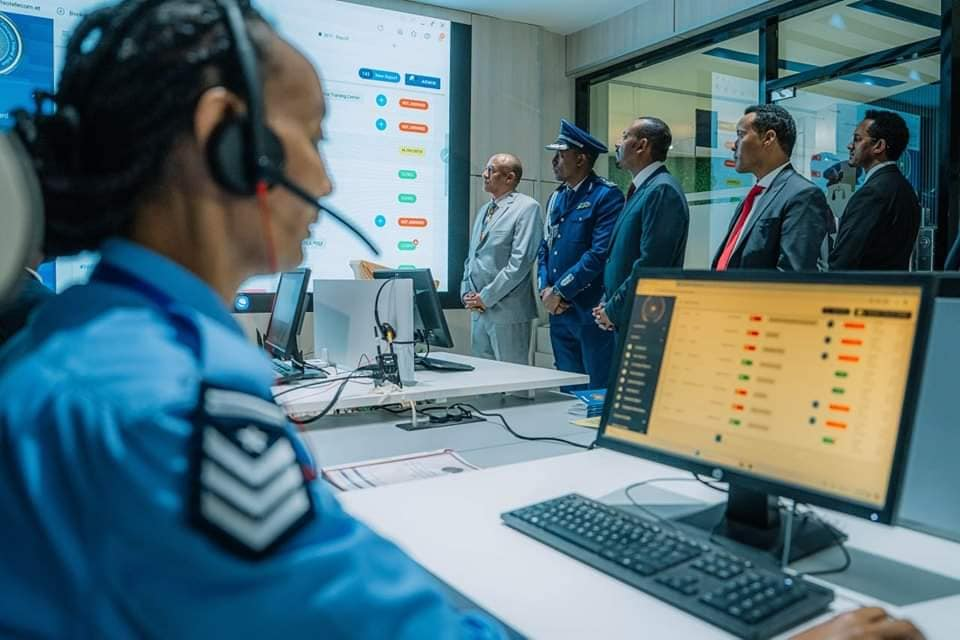
The Internal Security Unit

=== Federal Prisons Commission ===
The Federal Prison Commission was established under Proclamation No. 365/2003 responsible to Ministry of Federal Affairs. Its objectives is to guard and admit prisoners and provide reformative and rehabilitative service in order to alter to good behavior and restore into law complying person. It has power and function to most facilities.

=== State Institutions ===
- The State Justice Bureaus: are a part of the executive branch of the state government that mirror the Federal Ministry of Justice in their structure and mandate. They have relative power to the Ministry of Justice with Head.
- The State Police and Prison Commissions: are independent police commission division that serve in regional level and accountable to the State Justice Bureaus. Despite their independency, they are obliged to cooperate with the federal Police Commission to facilitate condition in the national level.

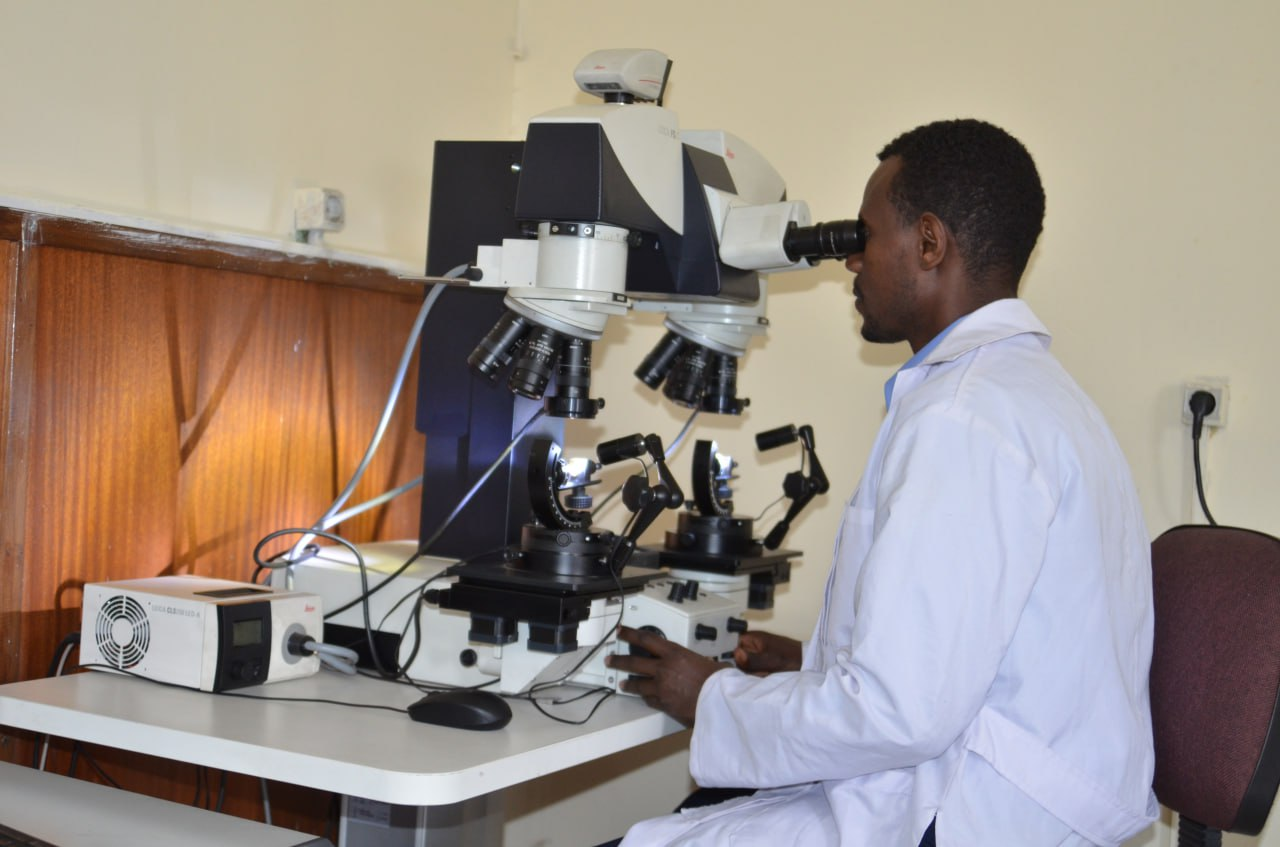
The Forensic Unit

== Major problems ==
The Federal Police Commission Proclamations of 2000, 2003 or 2011 stipulate a constitutional and criminal code obligation of Federal Police discipline. It then reinforced by the Federal Police Officers Administration Regulation of 2012 requiring to respect international human rights instruments by placing restriction over use of force, coercion and sexually motivated abuse that are considered grave disciplinary offenses. In current and previous regime, the Addis Ababa Police often involved in advocacy of political agenda rather than committing to Constitution. This action gradually gained backlash and negative public attitude against the institution.

Police misconduct has resurged in recent years. On 26 August 2019, a video showing handcuffed man being beaten by two police officers in Addis Ababa was released on Twitter, which induced outrage. It is possible that lack of accountability and investigation (in Article 52 of Federal Police Commission Administration) and the 2000 Federal Police Proclamation, the 2003 Federal Police Commission Proclamation, the 2011 Federal Police Proclamation and the 2012 Federal Police Officers Administration Regulation do not mention consideration of victims in police brutality.

== Police band ==
The Ethiopian Federal Police March Band traced back to 1940s. The band consists of twenty members of the police force, many of whom play brass, woodwind, and percussion music instruments while the trumpet instructs them.

== List of commissioner-generals ==
Name	Term start	Term end
Workneh Gebeyehu	2001	2012
Assefa Abiyo	2012	19 April 2018
Yared Zerihun	19 April 2018	25 June 2018
Zeynu Ummer	25 June 2018	22 October 2018
Endashaw Tassew	6 November 2018	8 November 2020
Demelash Gebremichael	8 November 2020	Incumbent
