= Ethiopian Federal Prison Commission =

Ethiopian Federal Prison Commission የኢትዮጵያ ፈድራል እስር ቤት ኮሚሽን
- Abbreviation: EFP

Agency overview
- Formed: 1995

Jurisdictional structure
- Operations jurisdiction: Ethiopia

Operational structure
- Agency executive: Damena Darota
- Parent agency: Ethiopian Federal Police

The Ethiopian Federal Prison Commission (Amharic: የኢትዮጵያ ፈድራል እስር ቤት ኮሚሽን, EFP) is the Ethiopian Federal Police subordinate authority that is responsible for the custody, reformation, and rehabilitation of prisoners in Ethiopia as well as implementing judicial decision. Established in 1995 by Proclamation No. 365/2003, the Federal Prison Commission consists of one federal and regional state prisons.

== Background ==
The Ethiopian Federal Prison Commission is responsible for the custody, reformation, and rehabilitation of prisoners in Ethiopia as well as implementing judicial decision. It was established in 1995 under Proclamation No. 365/2003. In 2021, the Prison Commission launched a national prison training curriculum at the annual consultation forum of Federal and Regional Prison Commissions organized by the Federal Prison Commission. Developed with UNODC support, the curriculum overlook prison steward and officials in Ethiopia in accordance with the United Nations Standard Minimum Rules for the Treatment of Prisoners (Nelson Mandela rules). This affects human rights condition in Ethiopia favorably.

The Ethiopian prison system consists of one federal and regional state prisons. Officers from federal and regional level usually trained by The Aleltu Training Centre. The Federal Prisons Administration engaged with Growth and Transformation Plan (GTP) to offer court sentence in TVET manner. This encompasses various human rights issues, by giving food and shelter bed linen, free medical services, and government hospital services.

== See also ==
- Law enforcement in Ethiopia
