= Desta Hagos =

Laureate Artist Desta Hagos
- Born: 1952 (age 73–74); Adwa
- Citizenship: Ethiopia
- Education: Addis Ababa School of Fine Arts and Design
- Occupation: Visual artist

Desta Hagos (Amharic: ደስታ ሃጎስ; born 1952) is an Ethiopian artist, credited for being the first woman painter to hold a solo exhibition in Ethiopia. As of 2017, she has participated in more than 50 exhibitions, and her work has been shown internationally in countries such as Canada, the United States, Korea, Denmark, Germany, Spain, and Qatar. She paints landscapes alongside abstract pieces, and she frequently focuses on depicting the day-to-day experiences of women.

== Early life and education ==
Desta Hagos was born in 1952 in the town of Adwa, located in the northern Tigray region of Ethiopia. Her interest in art was sparked by a gift of crayons from her father when she was five years old. When she was nine, she moved to Addis Ababa.

In 1966, Desta earned a diploma from the Addis Ababa School of Fine Arts and Design and became the school's second female graduate. She followed it up with a Bachelor of Arts degree in visual arts in 1969. During her studies at the Addis Ababa School, she shared a communal studio with four other artists, and attended events featuring prominent Ethiopian writers such as Tsegaye Gabre-Medhin, Mengistu Lemma, and Baalu Girma. Her work and developing style as a painter was influenced by artist Gebre Kristos Desta, who was one of her teachers. In 1969, after graduation, she held a solo art exhibition inside a local hotel. She is credited as the first woman painter to have held a solo art exhibition in Ethiopia.

Desta briefly took an art instructor position at the Addis Ababa School, but soon chose to leave for the United States with her fiancé when he received a scholarship to study there. She continued her own studies and completed a Bachelor of Fine Arts at California Lutheran College, graduating in 1974.

== Career ==
Desta and her husband returned to Ethiopia in 1974, but the violence of the Ethiopian revolution soon led to her husband fleeing the country again permanently, moving to Kenya alone. Desta was prevented by authorities from following him. Their daughter was born in 1976, and Desta raised her as a single parent. She worked at the Ethiopian Tourist Organization and then the Ethiopian Tourist Trading Enterprise, eventually retiring in 2002.

Desta opened an art gallery in Addis Ababa. As of 2017, she has participated in more than 50 exhibitions, showing her paintings both in Ethiopia and in countries such as Canada, the United States, Korea, Denmark, Germany and Spain. In 1998, her work was featured as part of the Rise with the Sun: Women and Africa showcase at the Provincial Museum of Alberta. In 2015, one of her paintings appeared at an Ethiopian cultural exhibition at the Katara Cultural Village in Qatar, while her art also featured in the international Miami Art Basel, marking the first year Ethiopian artwork had been included at the Miami-based art fair.

Her paintings often focus on nature and landscapes, along with more abstract pieces. One of her topics of focus is the day-to-day experiences of women.
