= Military history of Italy =

The military history of Italy chronicles a vast time period, lasting from the military conflicts fought by the ancient peoples of Italy, most notably the conquest of the Mediterranean world by the ancient Romans, through medieval warfare, the expansion of the Italian city-states and maritime republics, the involvement of the historical Italian states in the Italian Wars and the wars of succession, to the Napoleonic period, the Italian unification (known as Risorgimento), the campaigns of the colonial empire, the two world wars, and into the modern day, with world peacekeeping operations under the aegis of NATO, the EU or the UN. The Italian Peninsula has been a centre of military conflict throughout European history due to its geostrategic position: because of this, Italy has a long military tradition.

== Archaic Italy ==
=== Etruscans and Italic peoples ===
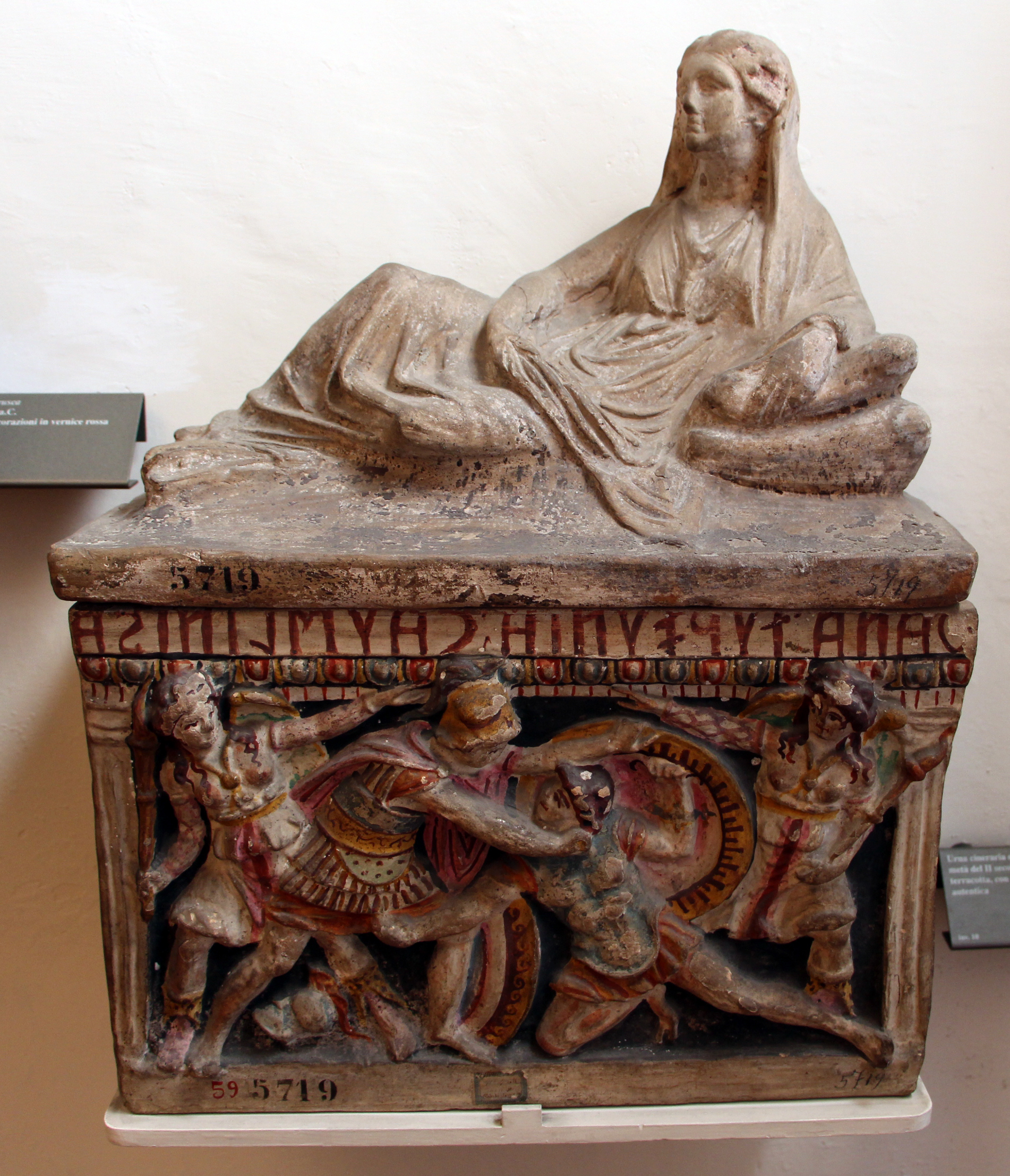
Etruscan funerary urn crowned with the sculpture of a woman and a front-panel relief showing two warriors fighting, polychrome terracotta, c. 150 BCE

In the 1st millennium BC, the territory of present-day Italy was inhabited by a multitude of populations differing in origin, culture, language and religion. The difference was also reflected in the variety of military organization they had. Much of central-southern and north-eastern Italy was inhabited by populations called Italic peoples, or rather by the type of languages they spoke. In the 8th century BC in central-southern Italy, for example, Latins were settled in the west from which the Romans would later emerge, Sabines in the upper Tiber Valley, Umbrians in the north-east, Samnites in the south, Oscans and others shared the Italian Peninsula with two other main ethnic groups: Etruscans to the north, and Greeks to the south.

The Etruscans (Etrusci or Tusci in Latin) were settled north of Rome in Etruria (modern northern Lazio, Tuscany and part of Umbria). They founded cities like Tarquinia, Veii and Volterra and deeply influenced Roman culture, as clearly shown by the Etruscan origin of some of the mythical Roman kings. The origins of the Etruscans are lost in prehistory. Historians have no literature, no texts of religion or philosophy; therefore much of what is known about this civilization is derived from grave goods and tomb findings.

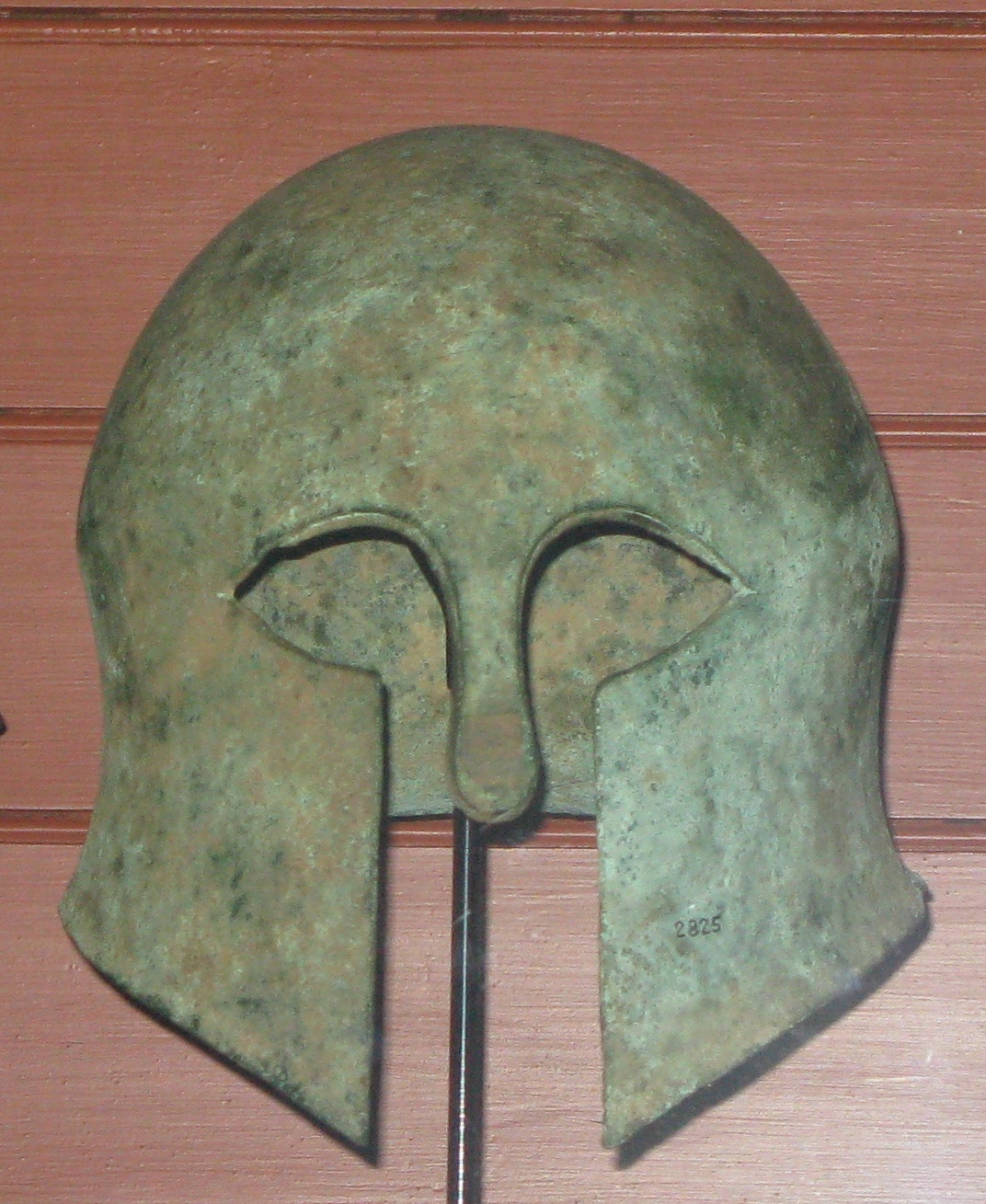
An Etruscan bronze helmet

Given their federal organization as city-states, in the event of war the armies were recruited on an Etruscan city basis and calling citizens to arms according to wealth and social position; consequently the composition, equipment and appearance of the armies had to vary greatly. The armed formations included bodies of hoplites, light troops and cavalry, each with their own equipment and tasks. In fact, the structure of the units was based on the armament, the infantry could be heavy or light. The cavalry had reconnaissance and exploration purposes, while in the archaic age the war chariot was also used. The Etruscans had a territory with many metal deposits at their disposal, especially the island of Elba, the metallurgical technique of the Etruscan blacksmiths was advanced and allowed them to have higher quality weapons than other peoples.

The Italic peoples were war-like as the Etruscans were (the gladiatorial displays actually evolved out of Etruscan funerary customs). The Italics and the Etruscans had a significant military tradition. In addition to marking the rank and power of certain individuals in their culture, warfare was a considerable economic boon to their civilization. Like many ancient societies, the Italics and the Etruscans conducted campaigns during summer months, raiding neighboring areas, attempting to gain territory and combating piracy/banditry as a means of acquiring valuable resources such as land, prestige and goods. It is also likely individuals taken in battle would be ransomed back to their families and clans at high cost.

After 650 BCE, the Etruscans became dominant in central Italy, and expanded into north Italy founding cities like Mutina (modern Modena) and Felsina (modern Bologna). Roman tradition claimed that Rome had been under the control of seven "etruscan" kings from 753 to 509 BCE beginning with the mythic Romulus who, along with his brother Remus, were said to have founded the city of Rome.

=== Cisalpine Gaul ===
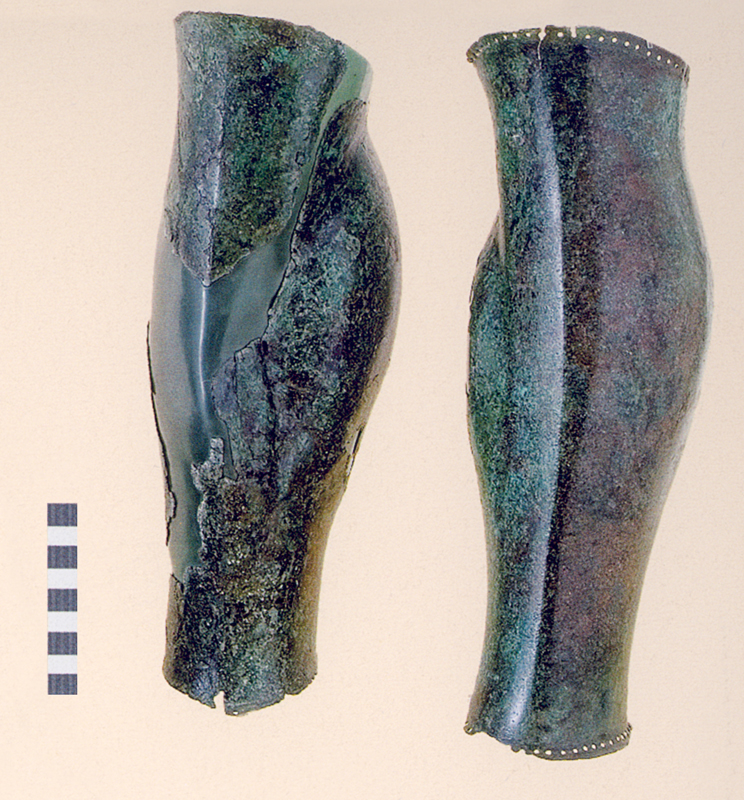
Greaves belonging to the Golasecca culture found in Sesto Calende

The northern part of Italy was called Cisalpine Gaul because of the presence of Celtic tribes and the strong influence they had on the region. Non-Celtic people like Ligures in the western part, and Adriatic Veneti in the eastern, also existed and were the majority of population of Cisalpine Gaul, although they were very influenced by Celts in their culture, and warfare was no exception. The Ligurians practised warfare mainly by ambush and their weaponry was very similar to the Celtic one, Greek, and illirian ones (e.g. with hoplites and phalanx), but later emerges use of typical Celtic weapons and tactics.

The first Celtic presence in northern Italy could date back to the Bronze Age in the 13th century with the Canegrate culture, with the arrival of proto-Celtic populations from the Alps. This was followed in the Iron Age by the Golasecca culture (9th-4th century BC). A tomb dating back to this period presents in its armament characteristics of the nearby Hallstatt culture but also Etruscan or Greek.

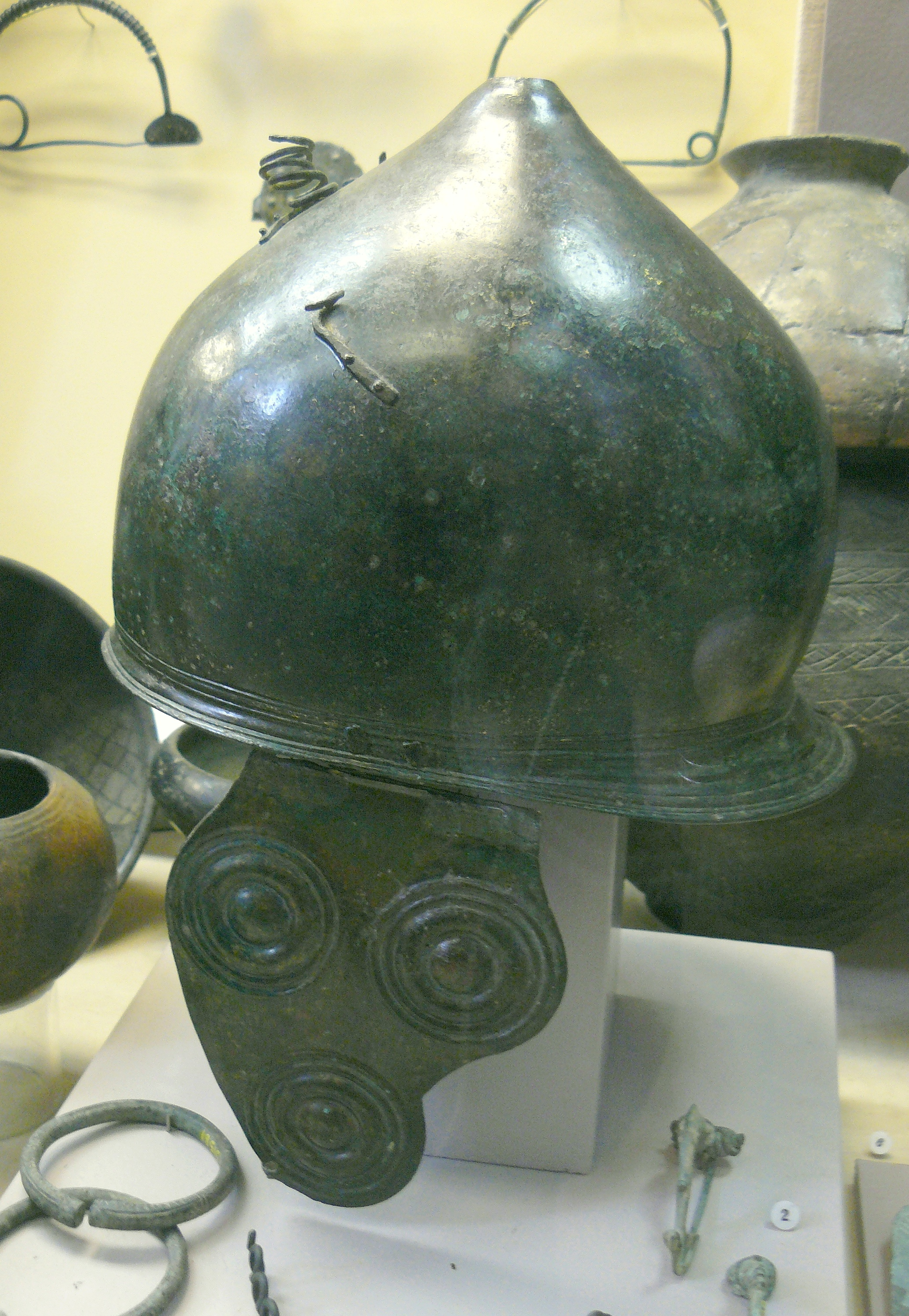
Celtic helmet from the 3rd century BC in bronze

Ethnolinguistic map of Italy in the Iron Age, before the Roman expansion and conquest of Italy

During the 5th century BC the cities of Padanian Etruria fell due to the expansion of the Celts, and the latter also arrived on the Adriatic coast of central Italy, in the current area of northern Marche, where some weapons were discovered Celtic then also adopted by the Romans.

Initially the Ligures inhabited much of the North West, however the Celtic expansion in the area led to the mixing of the two peoples, while the exclusively Ligurian area was reduced. In the 3rd century BC, the North-West was inhabited by a dense network of Celtic and Celtic-Ligurian populations, with different degrees of hybridization between the two ethnic components.

The Ligures and Celto-Ligurians practiced war mainly with ambush tactics, rarely in open fields, as cavalry was almost completely unknown and present only in the most Celticized tribes. The weapons used were very similar to Celtic ones, so much so that Ligurian objects from the late period are difficult to distinguish from Celtic ones. Some coastal tribes practiced piracy, attacking commercial ships passing through the Ligurian Sea and Tyrrhenian Sea. The Ligurian tribes located on the border with Etruria were in contact and clashed for a long time with the Etruscans, who wanted to expand in the region, being influenced in their armament.

The North-East was inhabited by an Italic-speaking population, namely the Venetians. Initially the military tactics of this people were very similar to those of Italy, Greece and the neighboring Illyrians, practicing the hoplite formation and using weapons such as round shields, similar to those of the Greek hoplites, helmets with a low cap and crest, and spears with wide tip. However, later the Celtic influence made itself more felt, leading to the use of typical Celtic weapons and tactics. To protect themselves from the periodic raids they suffered from the Gauls, the Venetians asked for help and became allies of the Romans. The Eastern Alps were inhabited by Rhaetian populations, of dubious origin, perhaps Etruscan, or indigenous Alpine, or perhaps both.

These many tribes were not united and often disagreed or even conflicted with each other. Tribal warfare was a regular feature of Celtic societies, using war to exercise political control and harass rivals, for economic advantage, and in some cases to conquer territory. An example in this area was the fight between the Celtic Insubres and the Taurini (Ligurian) that Hannibal intervened at, when he went to Italy just after crossing the Alps. The Cisalpine Celtic and Ligurian populations were sought after as mercenaries in the wars of the ancient world, until they were subjected to Rome between the 3rd and 2nd centuries BCE. However, the warlike tradition of this area did not disappear as in the late Roman imperial and early imperial ages; northern Italy became one of the most important recruitment basins for the Roman army.

=== Magna Graecia ===
Ancient Greek colonies and their dialect groupings in Magna Graecia

The Greeks had founded many colonies in Southern Italy (that the Romans later called Magna Graecia), such as Cumae, Naples and Taranto, as well as in the eastern two-thirds of Sicily, between 750 and 550 BCE.

At the beginning of the 6th century, all the main cities of Magna Graecia on the Ionian Sea had achieved a high economic and cultural development, which shifted their interests towards expansion of their territory by waging war on neighbouring cities. The 6th century was therefore characterised by great clashes between the colonies. Some of the clashes that established the new balance and the new relationships of force were the Battle of the Sagra river (the clash between Locri Epizefiri and Kroton), the destruction of Siris (by Sybaris and Metapontum), and the clash between Kroton and Sybaris (which ended with the destruction of the latter).

As with all the events of this period, precise dates are unknown, but the destruction of Sybaris may have occurred around 510 BC, while the two other clashes are placed around 580-560 BC, with the destruction of Siris before the Battle of the Sagra.

== Ancient Rome ==
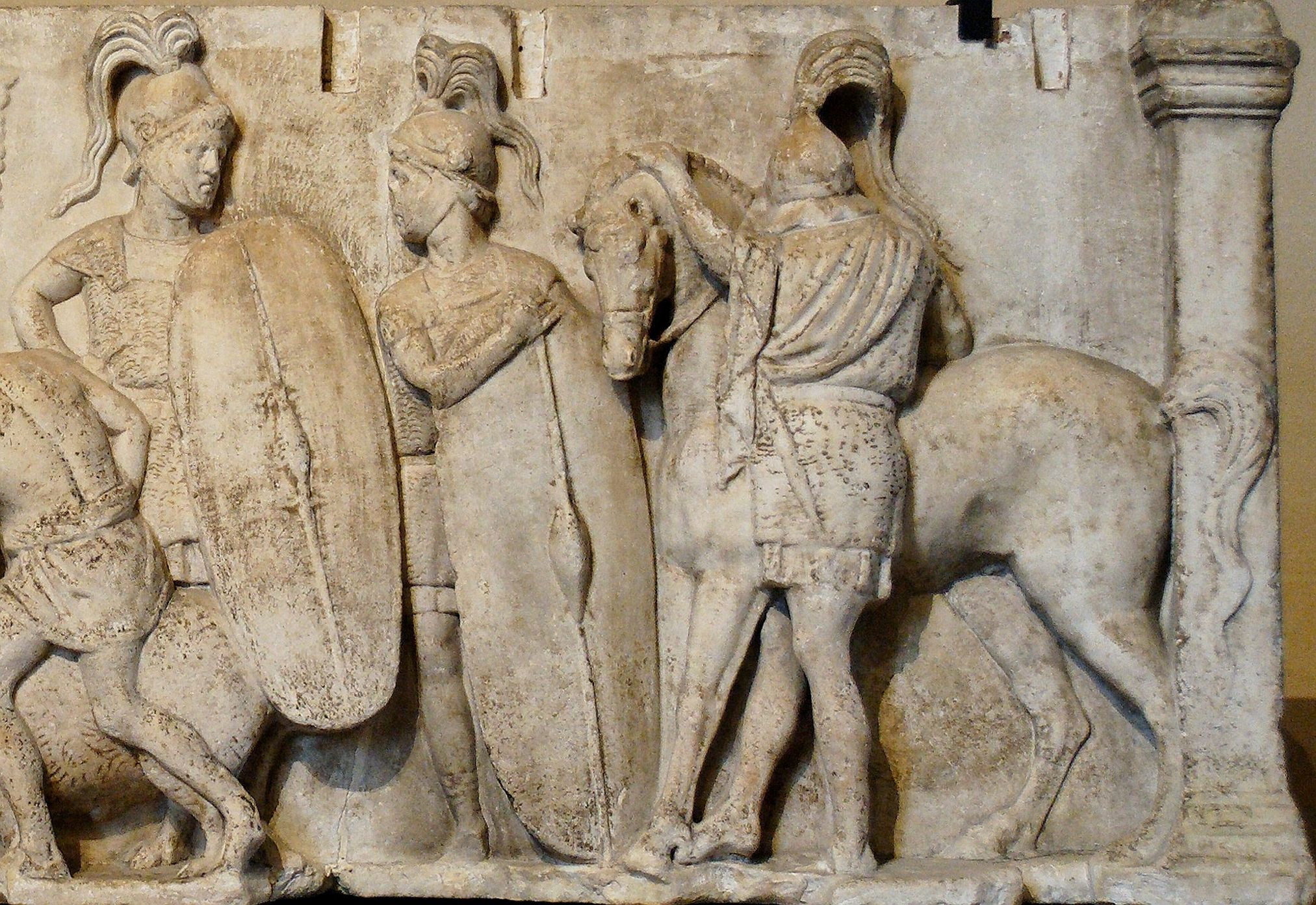
Levy of the army, detail of the carved relief on the Altar of Domitius Ahenobarbus, 122-115 BCE.

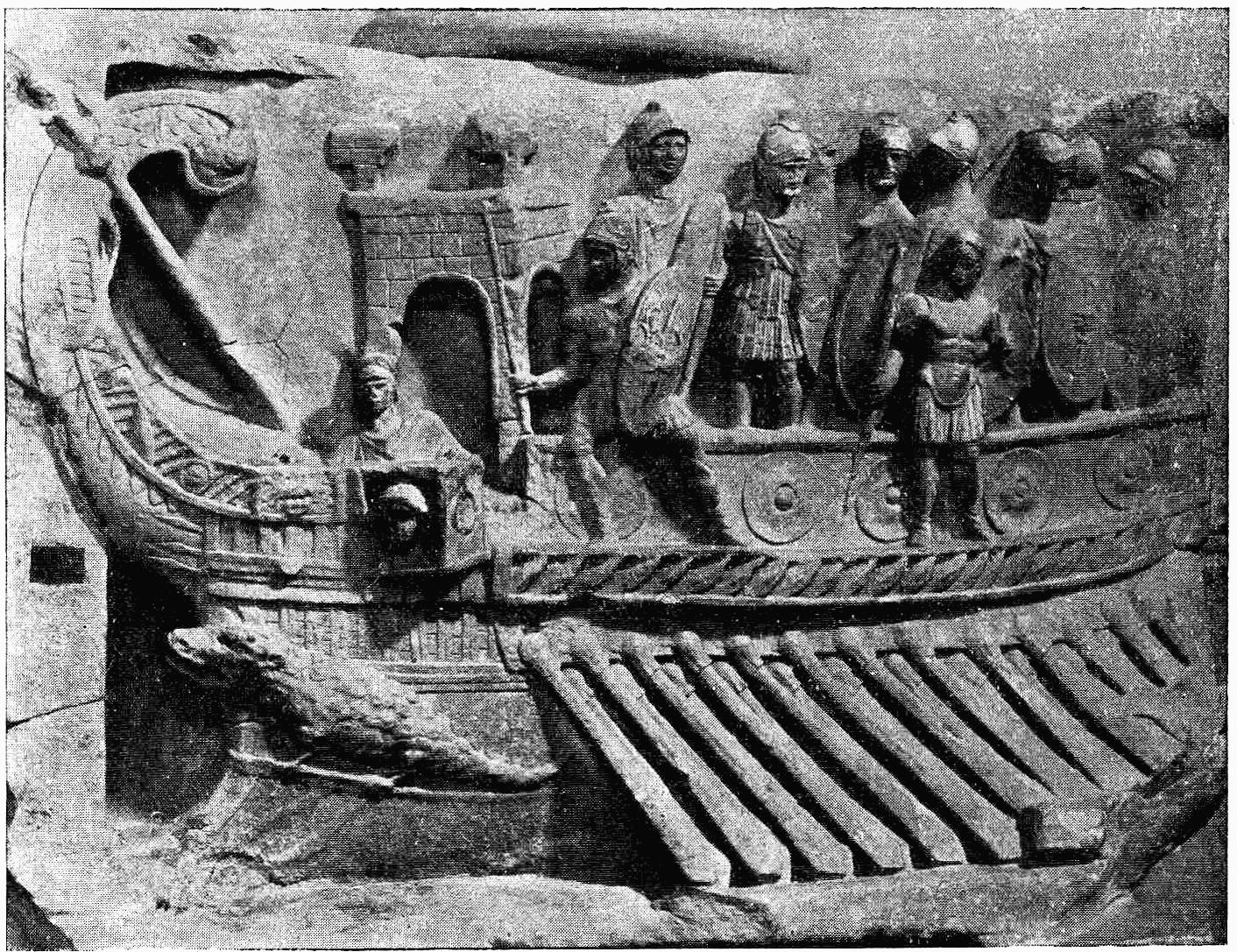
A Roman naval bireme depicted in a relief from the Temple of Fortuna Primigenia in Praeneste (Palastrina), which was built c. 120 BCE; exhibited in the Pius-Clementine Museum (Museo Pio-Clementino) in the Vatican Museums.

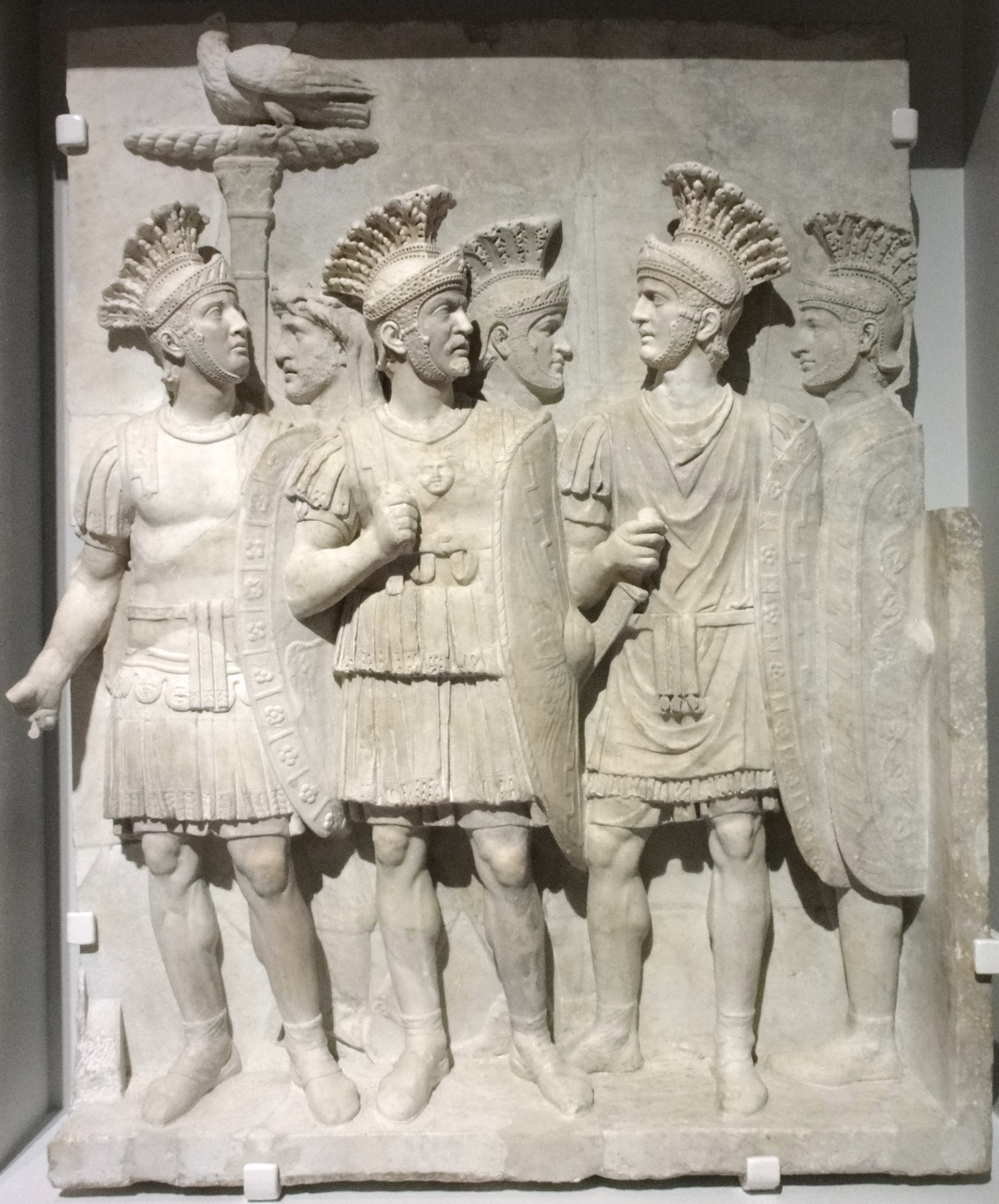
Roman relief fragment depicting the Praetorian Guard, c. 50 CE

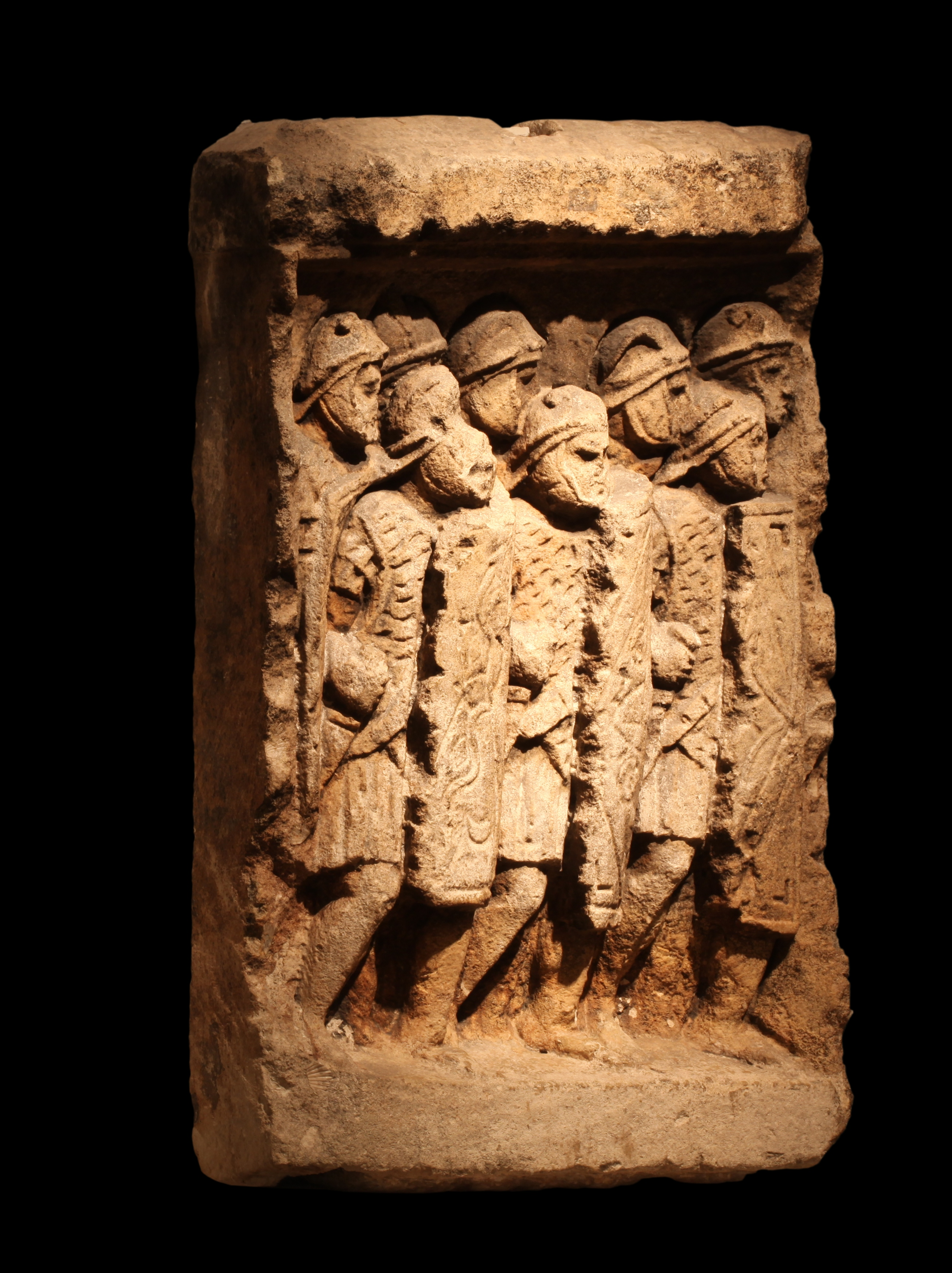
Imperial Roman legionaries in tight formation, a relief from Glanum, a Roman town in what is now southern France that was inhabited from 27 BCE to 260 CE (when it was sacked by invading Alemanni)

The early Roman army (c. 500 BCE) was, like those of other contemporary city-states influenced by Greek civilization, a citizen militia which practiced hoplite tactics. It was small (the population of free males of military age was then about 9,000) and organized in five classes (in parallel to the comitia centuriata, the body of citizens organized politically), with three providing hoplites and two providing light infantry. The early Roman army was tactically limited and its stance during this period was essentially defensive. By the 3rd century BCE, the Romans abandoned the hoplite formation in favor of a more flexible system in which smaller groups of 120 (or in some cases 60) men called maniples could maneuver more independently on the battlefield. Thirty maniples arranged in three lines with supporting troops constituted a legion, totaling between 4,000 and 5,000 men. The early Republican legion consisted of five sections, each of which was equipped differently and had different places in formation: the three lines of manipular heavy infantry (hastati, principes and triarii), a force of light infantry (velites), and the cavalry (equites). With the new organization came a new orientation toward the offensive and a much more aggressive posture toward adjoining city-states.

Augustus, the first emperor of Rome

At nominal full strength, an early Republican legion would have included 3,600 to 4,800 heavy infantry, several hundred light infantry and several hundred cavalrymen, for a total of 4,000 to 5,000 men. Legions were often significantly understrength from recruitment failures or following periods of active service due to accidents, battle casualties, disease and desertion. During the Civil War, Pompey's legions in the east were at full strength because recently recruited, while Caesar's legions were in many cases well below nominal strength after long active service in Gaul. This pattern also held true for auxiliary forces.

Until the late Republican period, the typical legionary was a property-owning citizen farmer from a rural area (an adsiduus) who served for particular (often annual) campaigns, and who supplied his own equipment and, in the case of equites, his own mount. Harris suggests that down to 200 BCE, the average rural farmer (who survived) might participate in six or seven campaigns. Freedmen and slaves (wherever resident) and urban citizens did not serve except in rare emergencies. After 200 BCE, economic conditions in rural areas deteriorated as manpower needs increased, so that the property qualifications for service were gradually reduced. Beginning with Gaius Marius in 107 BCE, citizens without property and some urban-dwelling citizens (proletarii) were enlisted and provided with equipment, although most legionaries continued to come from rural areas. Terms of service became continuous and long—up to twenty years if emergencies required it although Brunt argues that six or seven years was more typical. Beginning in the 3rd century BCE, legionaries were paid stipendium (amounts are disputed but Caesar famously "doubled" payments to his troops to 225 denarii a year), could anticipate booty and donatives (distributions of plunder by commanders) from successful campaigns and, beginning at the time of Marius, often were granted allotments of land upon retirement. Cavalry and light infantry attached to a legion (the auxilia) were often recruited in the areas where the legion served. Caesar formed a legion, the Fifth Alaudae, from non-citizens in Transalpine Gaul to serve in his campaigns in Gaul. By the time of Caesar Augustus, the ideal of the citizen-soldier had been abandoned and the legions had become fully professional. Legionaries were paid 900 sesterces a year and could expect a payment of 12,000 sesterces on retirement.

At the end of the Civil War, Augustus reorganized Roman military forces, discharging soldiers and disbanding legions. He retained 28 legions, distributed through the provinces of the Empire. During the Principate, the tactical organization of the Army continued to evolve. The auxilia remained independent cohorts, and legionary troops often operated as groups of cohorts rather than as full legions. A new versatile type of unit, the cohortes equitatae, combining cavalry and legionaries in a single formation could be stationed at garrisons or outposts, could fight on their own as balanced small forces or could combine with other similar units as a larger legion-sized force. This increase in organizational flexibility over time helped ensure the long-term success of Roman military forces.

The Emperor Gallienus (253–268 CE) began a reorganization that created the final military structure of the late Empire. Withdrawing some legionaries from the fixed bases on the border, Gallienus created mobile forces (the Comitatenses or field armies) and stationed them behind and at some distance from the borders as a strategic reserve. The border troops (limitanei) stationed at fixed bases continued to be the first line of defense. The basic unit of the field army was the "regiment", legiones or auxilia for infantry and vexillationes for cavalry. Evidence suggests that nominal strengths may have been 1,200 men for infantry regiments and 600 for cavalry, although many records show lower actual troop levels (800 and 400). Many infantry and cavalry regiments operated in pairs under the command of a comes. In addition to Roman troops, the field armies included regiments of "barbarians" recruited from allied tribes and known as foederati. By 400 CE, foederati regiments had become permanently established units of the Roman army, paid and equipped by the Empire, led by a Roman tribune and used just as Roman units were used. In addition to the foederati, the Empire also used groups of barbarians to fight along with the legions as "allies" without integration into the field armies. Under the command of the senior Roman general present, they were led at lower levels by their own officers.

Military leadership evolved greatly over the course of the history of Rome. Under the monarchy, the hoplite armies would have been led by the kings of Rome. During the early and middle Roman Republic, military forces were under the command of one of the two elected consuls for the year. During the later Republic, members of the Roman Senatorial elite, as part of the normal sequence of elected public offices known as the cursus honorum, would have served first as quaestor (often posted as deputies to field commanders), then as praetor. Following the end of a term as praetor or consul, a Senator might be appointed by the Senate as a propraetor or proconsul (depending on the highest office previously held) to govern a foreign province. More junior officers (down to but not including the level of centurion) were selected by their commanders from their own clientelae or those recommended by political allies among the Senatorial elite. Under Augustus, whose most important political priority was to place the military under a permanent and unitary command, the Emperor was the legal commander of each legion but exercised that command through a legatus (legate) he appointed from the Senatorial elite. In a province with a single legion, the legate would command the legion (legatus legionis) and also serve as provincial governor, while in a province with more than one legion, each legion would be commanded by a legate and the legates would be commanded by the provincial governor (also a legate but of higher rank). During the later stages of the Imperial period (beginning perhaps with Diocletian), the Augustan model was abandoned. Provincial governors were stripped of military authority, and command of the armies in a group of provinces was given to generals (duces) appointed by the Emperor. These were no longer members of the Roman elite but men who came up through the ranks and had seen much practical soldiering. With increasing frequency, these men attempted (sometimes successfully) to usurp the positions of the Emperors who had appointed them. Decreased resources, increasing political chaos and civil war eventually left the Western Empire vulnerable to attack and takeover by neighboring barbarian peoples.

Comparatively less is known about the Roman navy than the Roman army. Prior to the middle of the 3rd century BCE, officials known as duumviri navales commanded a fleet of twenty ships used mainly to control piracy. This fleet was given up in 278 CE and replaced by allied forces. The First Punic War required that Rome build large fleets, and it did so largely with the assistance of and financing from allies. This reliance on allies continued to the end of the Roman Republic. The quinquereme was the main warship on both sides of the Punic Wars and remained the mainstay of Roman naval forces until replaced by the time of Caesar Augustus by lighter and more maneuverable vessels. As compared with a trireme, the quinquereme permitted the use of a mix of experienced and inexperienced crewmen (an advantage for a primarily land-based power), and its lesser maneuverability permitted the Romans to adopt and perfect boarding tactics using a troop of approximately 40 marines in lieu of the ram. Ships were commanded by a navarch, a rank equivalent to a centurion, who were usually not citizens. Potter suggests that because the fleet was dominated by non-Romans, the navy was considered non-Roman and allowed to atrophy in times of peace.

Available information suggests that by the time of the late Empire (350 CE), the Roman navy comprised a number of fleets including both warships and merchant vessels for transportation and supply. Warships were oared sailing galleys with three to five banks of oarsmen. Fleet bases included such ports as Ravenna, Arles, Aquilea, Misenum and the mouth of the Somme River in the West and Alexandria and Rhodes in the East. Flotillas of small river craft (classes) were part of the limitanei (border troops) during this period, based at fortified river harbors along the Rhine and the Danube. The fact that prominent generals commanded both armies and fleets suggests that naval forces were treated as auxiliaries to the army and not as an independent service. The details of command structure and fleet strengths during this period are not well known although it is known that fleets were commanded by prefects.

== Middle Ages ==
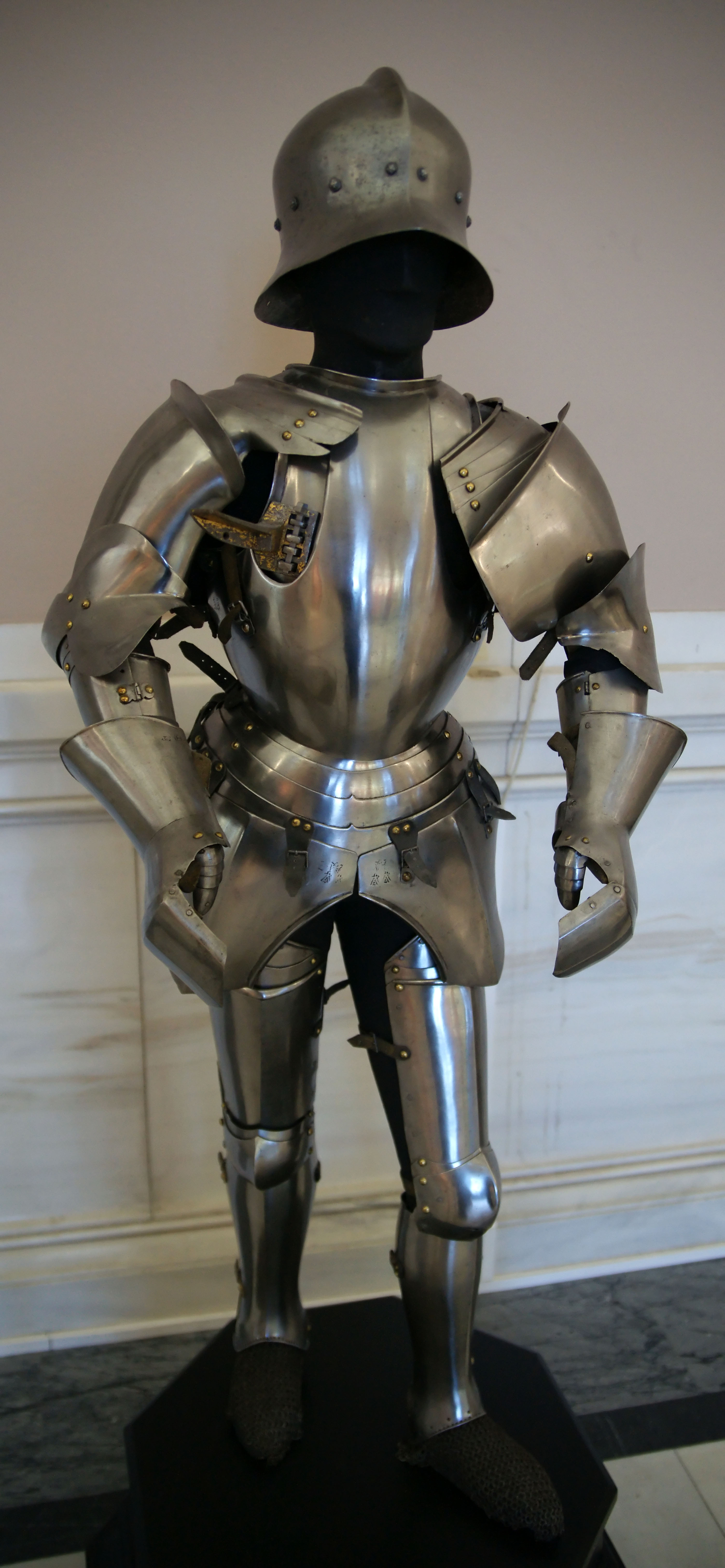
Suit of armor of the condottiero Roberto da Sanseverino, captured after his death at the Battle of Calliano (1487).

Throughout the Middle Ages, from the collapse of a central Roman government in the late 5th century to the Italian Wars of the Renaissance, Italy was constantly divided between opposing factions fighting for control. At the time of the deposition of Romulus Augustulus (476), the Heruli Confederation governed Italy, but it was displaced by the Ostrogoths, who fought a long war with the Byzantine army in Italy (the Gothic War). The Byzantine came out of the war victorious only to find Italy invaded by a new wave of barbarians led by the Lombards.

The Lombards diminished Byzantine territory to the Exarchate of Ravenna, the Duchy of Rome, the Duchy of Naples, and the far south of Apulia and Calabria. They established a kingdom centred on Pavia in the north. During the interregnum called the Rule of the Dukes (574–584), the dukes of the Lombards invaded Burgundy, but were repulsed by the Merovingian king Guntram, who in turn invaded Italy and took the region of Savoy. The Lombards were forced to elect a new king to organise their defence. For the next two centuries, the Byzantine power in the peninsula was reduced by the Lombard kings, the greatest of which was Liutprand, until it consisted of little more than the tips of the Italian toe and heel, Rome and its environs being practically independent under the popes and the Neapolitan coast under its dukes.

In 774, Charlemagne of the Franks invaded and conquered the Lombard kingdom. In the south of the peninsula, the Duchy of Benevento remained independent of Frankish dominion, however. During the period of Carolingian strength, Charlemagne's descendants governed the north of Italy in relative peace, except for the brief period of the rebellion of Bernard and the constant raids from the Slavs to the east and the Saracens to the south. Pirates harassed the Adriatic and Ligurian coasts and the islands of Corsica and Sardinia. The south was very different, as the Lombards were at the height of there power there. Warfare between Lombard and Greek, especially the Greek city-states of the Tyrrhenian, was endemic. The Greek cities fell out of the orbit of Constantinople and Byzantine possessions shrank to their smallest mark as the Lombards and the Saracens increased their predations. In 831, the Arabs conquered Palermo and in 902 they conquered Taormina, ending the conquest of Sicily. They likewise established their presence on the peninsula, especially on the Garigliano and in Bari. The story of the incessant conflicts of the states of the Mezzogiorno is chaotic until the arrival of the Normans in the early 11th century (1016). Under their leadership, the Jews of the south found themselves eventually united, the Arabs expelled, and the whole Mezzogiorno subjugated to the Hauteville dynasty of kings of Sicily (1130).

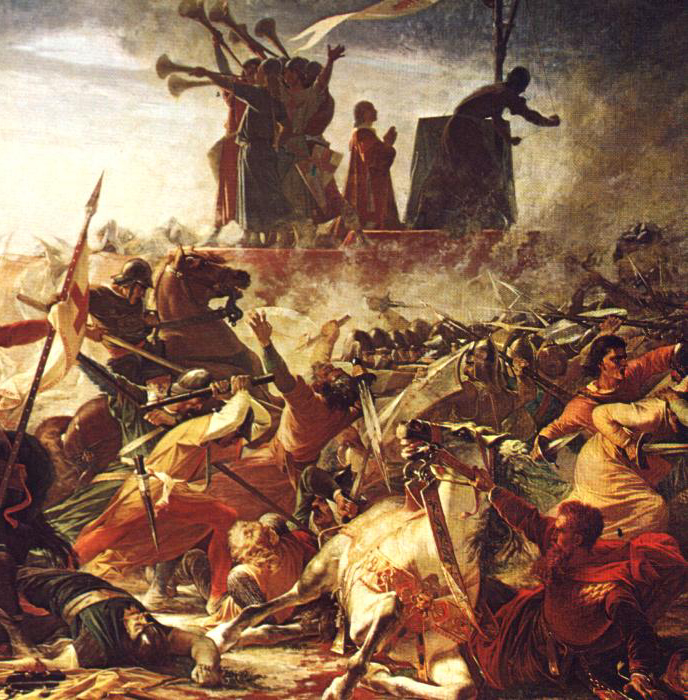
The defence of the Carroccio during the battle of Legnano by Amos Cassioli (1832–1891)

The second half of the Middle Ages in Italy was marked by frequent conflict between the Holy Roman Empire and the Papacy, the latter eventually emerging victorious in that it ultimately prevented political unification of northern Italy under Imperial rule. Imperial invasions were led by more or less all medieval Emperors, the most notable episodes being the end of the Investiture controversy by the pilgrimage of Henry IV, Holy Roman Emperor at Canossa in 1077 and the no less than five major invasions staged by Frederick Barbarossa against the Lombard League, culminating in the sack of Milan in 1162, after which every building in the city was demolished, except the churches. The lasting conflict led to the emergence of the Guelphs and Ghibellines in northern Italy, supporting respectively the Pope (and the independent cities) and the Emperor, though siding with a party was often dictated by other political considerations (more or less each city has belonged to both parties). In May 1176, the Lombard League, led by a revived Milan, defeated the Emperor Frederick Barbarossa in the Battle of Legnano.

The victory of the Guelph party meant the end of Imperial overlordship over northern Italy, and the formation of city-states such as Milan, Florence, Pisa, Siena, Genoa, Ferrara, Mantua, Verona, and Venice. High Medieval Northern Italy was further divided by the long running battle for supremacy between the forces of the papacy and of the Holy Roman Empire. Each city aligned itself with one faction or the other, yet was divided internally between the two warring parties, Guelphs and Ghibellines. The county of Savoy expanded its territory into the peninsula in the late Middle Ages, while Florence developed into a highly organized commercial and financial city-state, becoming for many centuries the European capital of silk, wool, banking and jewelry.

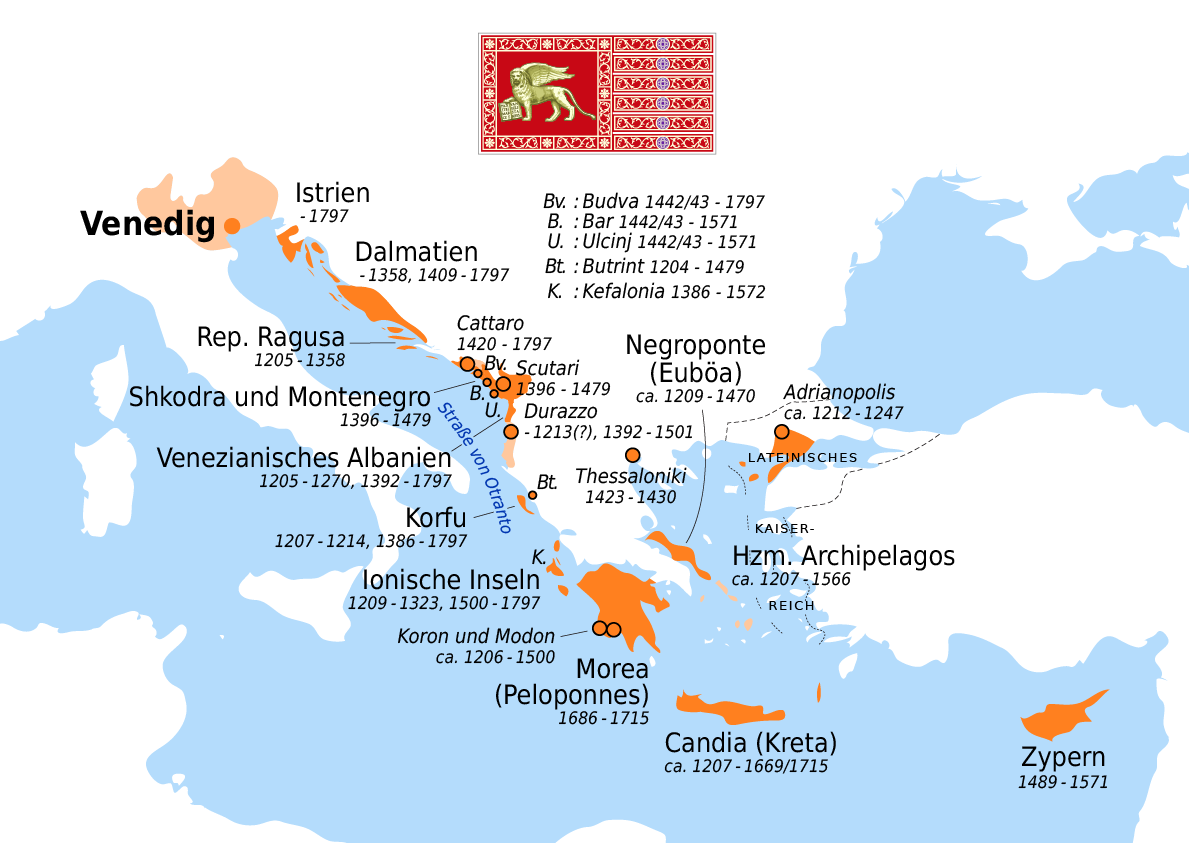
Map of the overseas domains of the Republic of Venice (Stato da Màr)

Warfare between the states was common, invasion from outside Italy confined to intermittent sorties of Holy Roman Emperors. Renaissance politics developed from this background. Since the 13th century, as armies became primarily composed of mercenaries, prosperous city-states could field considerable forces, despite their low populations. In the course of the 15th century, the most powerful city-states annexed their smaller neighbors. Florence took Pisa in 1406, Venice captured Padua and Verona, while the Duchy of Milan annexed a number of nearby areas including Pavia and Parma. The Duchy of Milan found itself in the focus of European power politics in the 15th century, leading to the drawn-out Italian Wars, which persisted for the best part of the 16th century before giving way to the Early Modern period in Italy. In the 14th century, Italy presents itself as divided between the Kingdom of Naples and Sicily in the south, the Papal States in Central Italy, and the Maritime republics in the north. While Venice was turning to the seas, supporting, and acquiring large loot from, the 1204 Fourth Crusade's sack of Constantinople, the other city-states were struggling for control of mainland, Florence being the rising power of the time.

Sicily was invaded in 1266 by Charles I, duke of Anjou; the Angevines were however toppled in the 1282 Sicilian Vespers, and Peter III of Aragon invaded the island. This set the background for later French claims over Naples and Sicily. Disintegration of the Holy Roman Empire and the Hundred Years War in neighbouring France meant that Italy was more or less left in peace during the 15th century; this allowed its cities to grow rich and to become attractive preys for its neighbours during the 16th century.

== Early Modern Period ==
=== Treaty of Lodi and Italian Wars ===
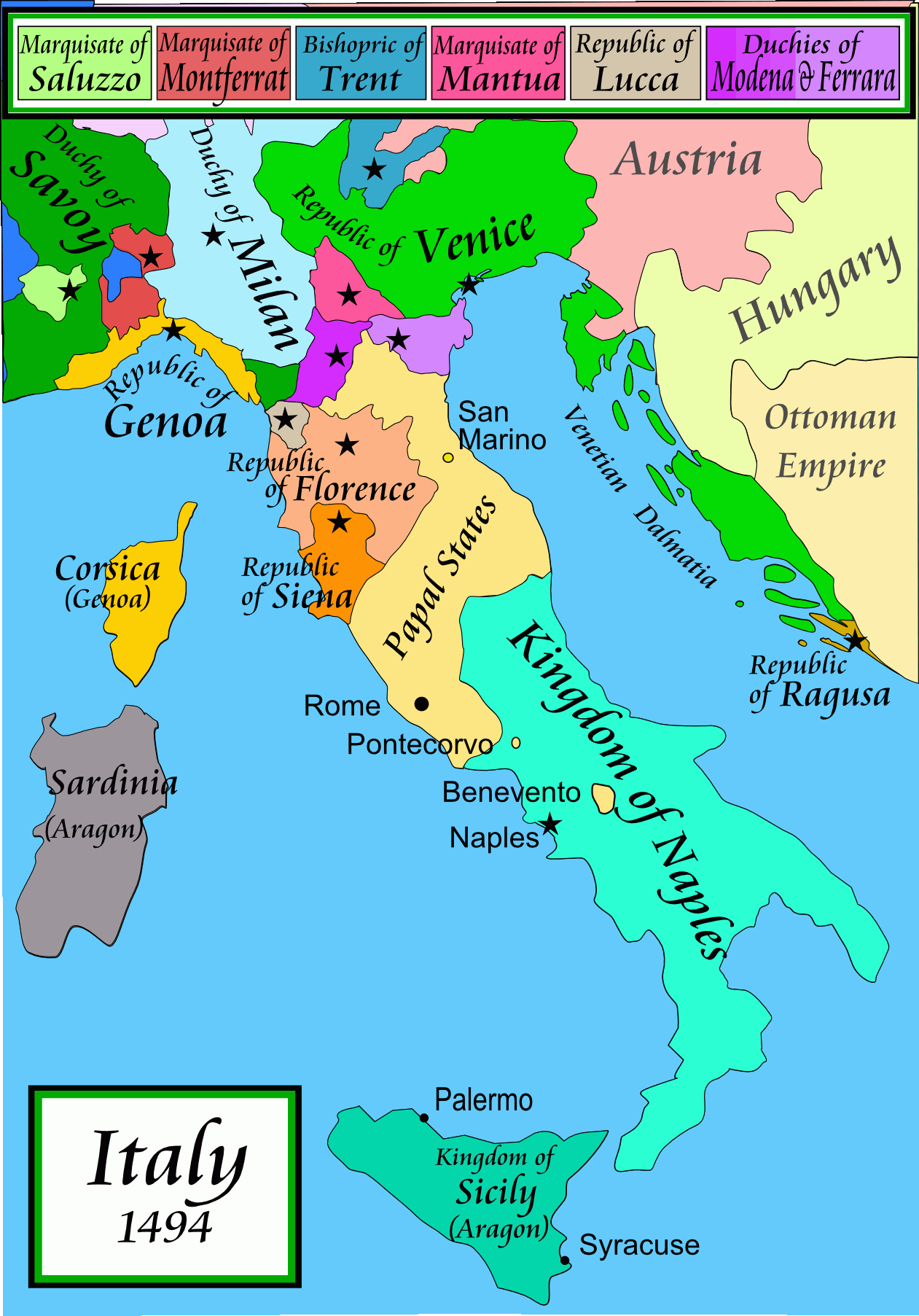
Italy in 1494, before the invasion of Charles VIII of France.

The relative peace that had prevailed in Italy following the Treaty of Lodi was shattered by the beginning of the Italian Wars in 1494. Ludovico Sforza, seeking allies, suggested to Charles VIII of France that the latter press his claim to the throne of Naples; Charles obliged and launched an invasion of the peninsula. The French march to, and capture of, Naples was accomplished with relative ease—the Italian states being shocked at the brutality of French tactics and the efficacy of the new French artillery—but Charles was forced to withdraw from Italy in 1495, after a hastily constructed alliance fought him at the Battle of Fornovo. Charles died in 1498, but the conflict he started would be continued by his successors; the Italian Wars would last until 1559, involving, at various times, all the major states of western Europe (France, Spain, the Holy Roman Empire, England, Scotland, the Republic of Venice, the Papal States, and most of the city-states of Italy) as well as the Ottoman Empire, and rapidly becoming a general struggle for power and territory among the various participants, marked with an increasing degree of alliances, counter-alliances, and regular betrayals.

In 1499, Louis XII of France launched the Second Italian War, invading Lombardy and seizing the Duchy of Milan. He then reached an agreement with Ferdinand I of Spain to divide Naples. By 1502, combined French and Spanish forces had seized control of the Kingdom; disagreements about the terms of the partition led to a war between Louis and Ferdinand. By 1503, Louis, having been defeated at the Battle of Cerignola and Battle of Garigliano, was forced to withdraw from Naples, which was left under the control of the Spanish viceroy, Gonzalo Fernández de Córdoba. Meanwhile, Pope Alexander VI attempted to carve a Borgia state from the Romagna through the efforts of Cesare Borgia.

In 1508, Pope Julius II formed the League of Cambrai, in which France, the Papacy, Spain and the Holy Roman Empire agreed to attack the Republic of Venice and partition her mainland territories. The resulting War of the League of Cambrai was a kaleidoscope of shifting alliances. The French defeated the Venetian army at the Battle of Agnadello, capturing extensive territories; but Julius, now regarding France as a greater threat, left the League and allied himself with Venice. After a year of fighting over the Romagna, he proclaimed a Holy League against the French; this rapidly grew to include England, Spain, and the Holy Roman Empire. The French were driven from Italy in late 1512, despite their victory at the Battle of Ravenna earlier that year, leaving Milan in the hands of Maximilian Sforza and his Swiss mercenaries; but the Holy League fell apart over the subject of dividing the spoils, and in 1513 Venice allied with France, agreeing to partition Lombardy between them. The French invasion of Milan in 1513 was defeated at the Battle of Novara, which was followed by a series of defeats for the French alliance; but Francis I of France defeated the Swiss at the Battle of Marignano in 1515, and the treaties of Noyon and Brussels left France and Venice in control of northern Italy.

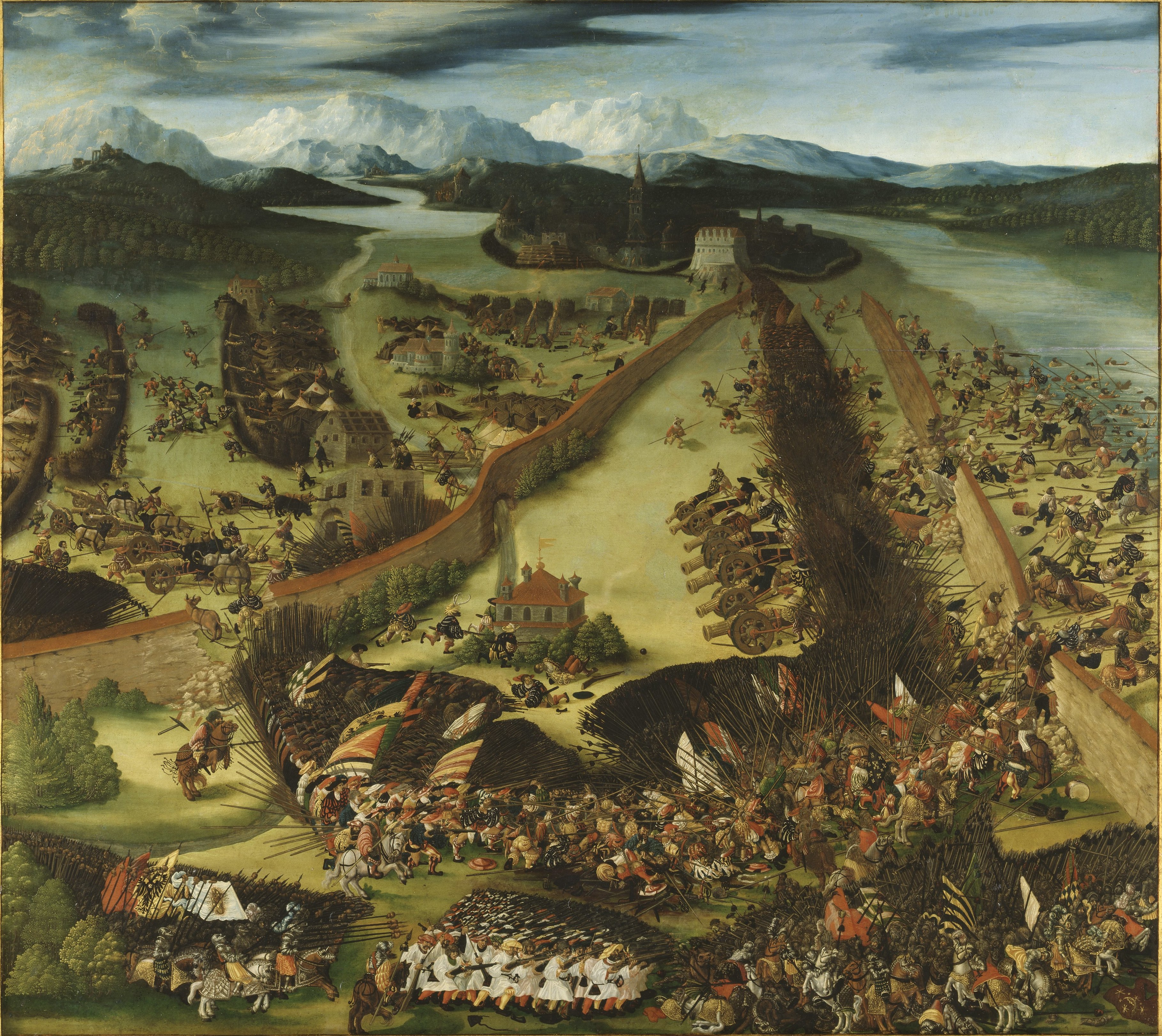
The Battle of Pavia by Ruprecht Heller (1529)

The election of Charles of Habsburg, already duke of Burgundy and King of Spain, as Holy Roman Emperor in 1519 led to a collapse of relations between France and the Habsburgs which resulted in the Italian War of 1521, in which France and Venice were pitted against England, the Papacy, and Charles's Habsburg possessions. Prosper Colonna defeated the French at the Battle of Bicocca, driving them from Lombardy. A series of abortive invasions of France by the allies and of Italy by the French continued until 1524, when Francis personally led a French army into Lombardy, only to be defeated and captured at the Battle of Pavia; imprisoned in Madrid, Francis was forced to agree to extensive concessions. Released in 1526, Francis repudiated the terms of the agreement, allied himself with Venice, the Papacy, Milan, and England, and launched the War of the League of Cognac. In 1527, Imperial troops sacked Rome itself; the French expedition to capture Naples the next year failed, leading Francis and Charles to conclude the Treaty of Cambrai. Charles then concluded a series of treaties at Barcelona and Bologna which eliminated all his opponents save the Florentine Republic, which was subdued by the Siege of Florence and returned to the Medici.

The remainder of the Italian Wars—which flared up again in 1535—was primarily a struggle between the Habsburgs and the Valois; while Italy was, at times, a battlefield, the Italian states played little further role in the fighting. The French managed to seize and hold Turin, defeating an Imperial army at the Battle of Ceresole in 1544; but the warfare continued (primarily in northern France) until Henry II of France was forced to accept the Peace of Cateau-Cambrésis in 1559, in which he renounced any further claims to Italy.

By the end of the wars in 1559, Habsburg Spain had been left in control of about half of Italy (the southern kingdoms of Naples, Sardinia and Sicily, as well as the Duchy of Milan in the north)), to the detriment of France. The other half of Italy remained independent, the main states being the Papacy, the Venetian Republic, the Genoese Republic, the Duchy of Tuscany and the Duchy of Savoy.

The Italian Wars had a number of consequences for the work and workplace of Leonardo da Vinci; his plans for a "Gran Cavallo" horse statue in 1495 were dropped when the seventy tons of bronze intended for the statue were instead cast into weapons to save Milan. Later, following a chance encounter with Francis I after the Battle of Marignano, Leonardo agreed to move to France, where he spent his final years.

In France, Henry II was fatally wounded in a joust held during the celebrations of the peace. His death led to the accession of his 15-year-old son Francis II, who in turn soon died. The French monarchy was thrown into turmoil, which increased further with the outbreak of the French Wars of Religion in 1562.

=== Notable Italian officers ===
Government-funded encyclopedias produced in Italy the 1930s listed notable Italian officers of the early modern period, over 4,100 names from 1560 to 1710. Of the 3,462 individuals for which place of origin is known, 20 percent came from the Venetian Republic (half from the capital city itself), 14.4 percent from the Papal States, 13.7 percent from Tuscany, 11.5 percent from Piedmont-Savoy, 10 percent from Naples (almost all from Campania, especially the capital city), 9.5 percent from Lombardy, 8.3 percent from Emilia, 7.3 percent from Liguria and Corsica (the Republic of Genoa), 2.7 percent from Sicily (almost all from the cities of Palermo and Messina), 2.3 percent from the Friulan marches and Trentino, and 0.3 percent from Sardinia.

=== Partial foreign domination ===
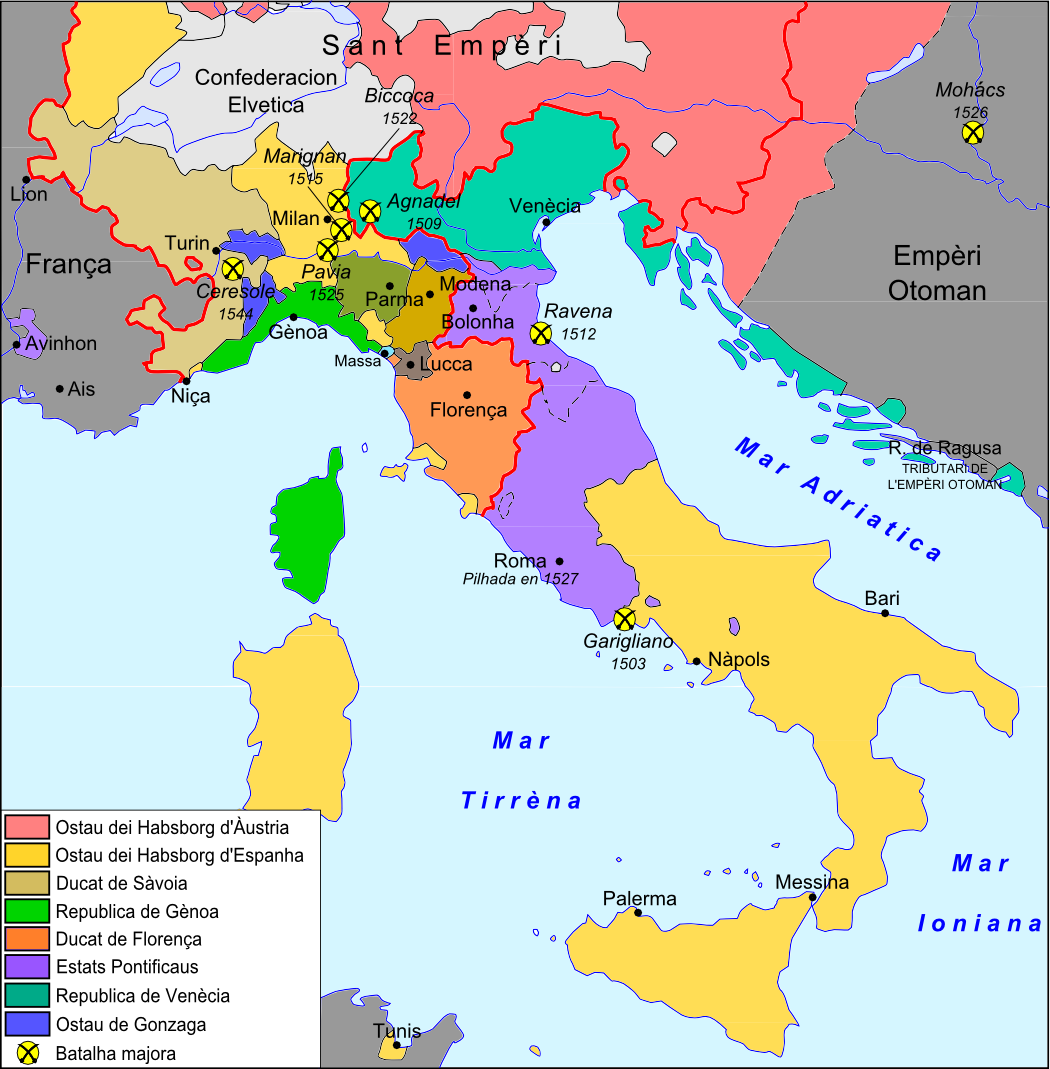
Map of Italy in 1559 after the Peace of Cateau-Cambrésis

Following the Peace of Cateau Cambrésis (1559), France renounced its claims in Italy. Some of the Italian states were under the rule of powerful dynasties: the Medici in Tuscany, the Farnese in Parma, the Este in Modena, and the Savoy in Piedmont. Nearly half of Italy, the kingdoms of Naples, Sicily and Sardinia and the Duchy of Milan were under the rule of the Spanish Empire.

Piedmont returned to the Savoy from France due to the role played by the duke Emmanuel Philibert in the battle of St Quentin during the Italian War of 1551–1559. The House of Savoy was "Italianized" at the end of the Italian wars, as Emmanuel Philibert made Turin the capital of the savoyard state and Italian the official language. The House of Medici kept ruling Florence, thanks to an agreement signed between the Pope and Charles V in 1530, and was later recognized as the ruling family of the Grand Duchy of Tuscany by Pope Pius V. The same Pope arranged the Holy League, a coalition of Venice and other maritime states that defeated the invading Ottoman forces at the naval battle of Lepanto (1571).

The Papal States launched the Counter-Reformation, which lasted from the Council of Trent (1545–1563) to the Peace of Westphalia in 1648. This period coincides with the European wars of religion and saw numerous Italians active in other Catholic nations, including de facto rulers of France (such as Catherine de Medici, Mary de Medici, Concino Concini and Jules Mazarin) and military generals serving under the auspices of the Holy Roman Empire or Spain (such as Torquato Conti, Raimondo Montecuccoli, Ottavio Piccolomini, Ambrogio Spinola and Alexander Farnese).

Despite the victory at Lepanto, the Venetians gradually lost its Eastern Mediterranean possessions (including Cyprus and Crete) to the Ottomans. Venice captured the Peloponnese during the Great Turkish war (1683–1699), but the land was ceded back after the last of the Venetian-Ottoman Wars. When the Seven Years' War broke out, Venice was left out of the concert of great powers: the same, however, was true for the Venetian mediterranean rivals such as the Ottoman Empire (sick man of Europe after centuries of warfare) and the Genoese who had lost its possessions in the Aegean Sea, in Tunisia, and, later, Corsica. The crisis of Genoa led to the crisis of Spain, as the Republic of Genoa was a key ally of the Spanish Empire since the 16th century, providing credit and economic support for the Habsburgs in what has been described as the age of the Genoese.

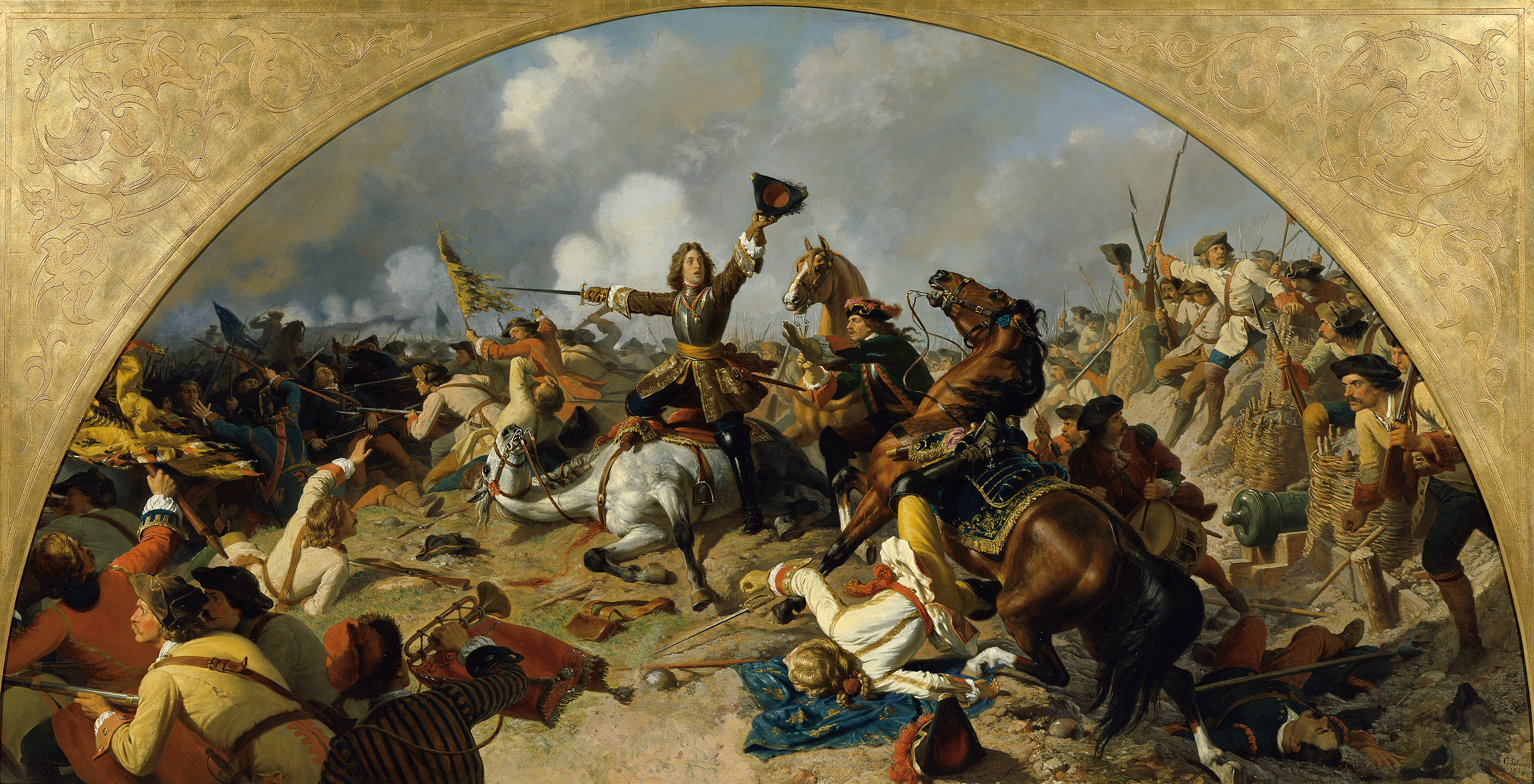
The Siege of Turin

The War of the Spanish Succession (1702–1715) and the War of the Quadruple Alliance (1718–1720) established the Habsburg monarchy as the dominant power in most of the present day Lombardy and Southern Italy (though the War of the Polish Succession resulted in the re-installment of the Spanish in the south, as the House of Bourbon-Two Sicilies). In this context Victor Amadeus II of Savoy, along with Eugene of Savoy, defeated the Franco-Spanish forces during the Siege of Turin (1706) and later formed the kingdom of Piedmont-Sardinia, predecessor state of Italy. The House of Habsburg-Lorraine succeeded the Medici of Florence in 1737 and Venice also became part of Austria with the treaty of Campo Formio in 1797.

The Napoleonic era is the link between the Habsburg domination and the Risorgimento. Napoleon's first military successes took place in Italy, at the head of the Armée d'Italie, and he later styled himself as President of Italy and King of Italy. Italy became part of the French sphere of influence but Napoleon, given his Italian ethnicity, was appreciated by most Italian intellectuals, among them the writer Alessandro Manzoni. The Restoration that followed the French defeat wasn't able to erase the political and legislative innovations brought to Italy by Napoleon. French historian Hippolyte Taine stated:

Napoleon, far more Italian than French, Italian by race, by instinct, imagination, and souvenir, considers in his plan the future of Italy, and, on casting up the final accounts of his reign, we find that the net loss is for France and the net profit is for Italy.

The Congress of Vienna (1814) restored the situation of the late 18th century, which was however quickly overturned by the incipient movement of Italian unification.

=== 18th century ===
Italy before the Napoleonic invasion (1796).

==== Piedmont ====
In 1700 the army was the main instrument used by the Savoy sovereigns (such as Victor Amedeus II and his successor Charles Emanuel III), who assured Piedmont its territorial expansion and the rise to European power, participating in the main wars that broke out in the period (wars of succession of Spain, Poland and Austria ). It is no coincidence that in this period Piedmont was called "the Italian Prussia". During the whole century there was a general tendency to enlarge the army, in 1774 the total number of Savoyan troops reached 100.000 units and it was in that occasion that the regulation concerning the duration of the permanent military service was introduced.

==== Naples ====
In 1734 there was the passage of the Kingdom of Naples and the Kingdom of Sicily from Habsburg to Bourbon rule as a result of the war of Polish succession. In the two previous centuries southern Italy and Sicily were part of the Spanish Empire as viceroys; later, in 1707, the Kingdom of Naples passed to Austria as part of the war of Spanish succession, while the Kingdom of Sicily was given to Victor Amadeus II of Savoy in 1713 with the peace of Utrecht.

The official date of birth of the Neapolitan army is however linked to the law of 25 November 1743, by which King Charles ordered the constitution of 12 provincial regiments, all composed of citizens of the Kingdom. In the spring of the following year the newborn army underwent its first test against the Austria at the Battle of Velletri. It marked its first great victory, in which entirely Neapolitan regiments took part, such as the "Terra di Lavoro" (which after the battle could boast the title of "Real", reserved only for veteran regiments).

==== Venice ====
On April 26, 1729 the Senate approved the military reform proposed by Marshal Count Schulenburg. On the basis of this reform, the land army was in peacetime composed of 20460 men.

Venice fought the Turkish in seventh Ottoman–Venetian War, one particular episode of this conflict was the battle of Corfu in 1716-1717 where 70,000 Turks tried to conquer the island then garrisoned by about 5,000 Venetian infantrymen, here at the end of the siege the Ottomans left on the field over 5,000 dead and 20 banners against just 400 dead Venetians, in 1784 there was an expedition led by Admiral Angelo Emo against the barbary pirate concluded with the bombing of the fort of Susa.

The republic in 1788 had an army of about 30,000 units with the possibility to increase the number through the use of local militias also called cernide. At the end of the Republic the Venetian military instrument was remarkable for the Italian averages (probably the third largest army in Italy).

== 19th century ==
=== Napoleonic era ===
Flag of the Lombard Legion

Italy was an important theatre in the War of the First Coalition. Napoleon Bonaparte, a French general of Italian origins, defeated the Austrians and their allies in multiple battles, establishing numerous Sister Republics in Italy. Those polities were satellite states of the French Republic, but had their own troops (legions) and saw the emergence of modern Italian nationalism. The Italian tricolor was created as a war flag of the Lombard Legion. Troops of the Sister Republics served as auxiliary forces of Napoleon's army and were mostly employed for domestic security. In 1799, as the War of the Second Coalition began, the Austro-Russian invasion destroyed the system set up by Bonaparte. A part of Italian forces regrouped in France; they were organized into an Italic Legion commanded by Giuseppe Lechi. The Italic legion took part in the Marengo campaign of 1800, defeating the Austrians in the battle of Varallo and liberating Lecco, Bergamo, Brescia, Mantua and Trento.

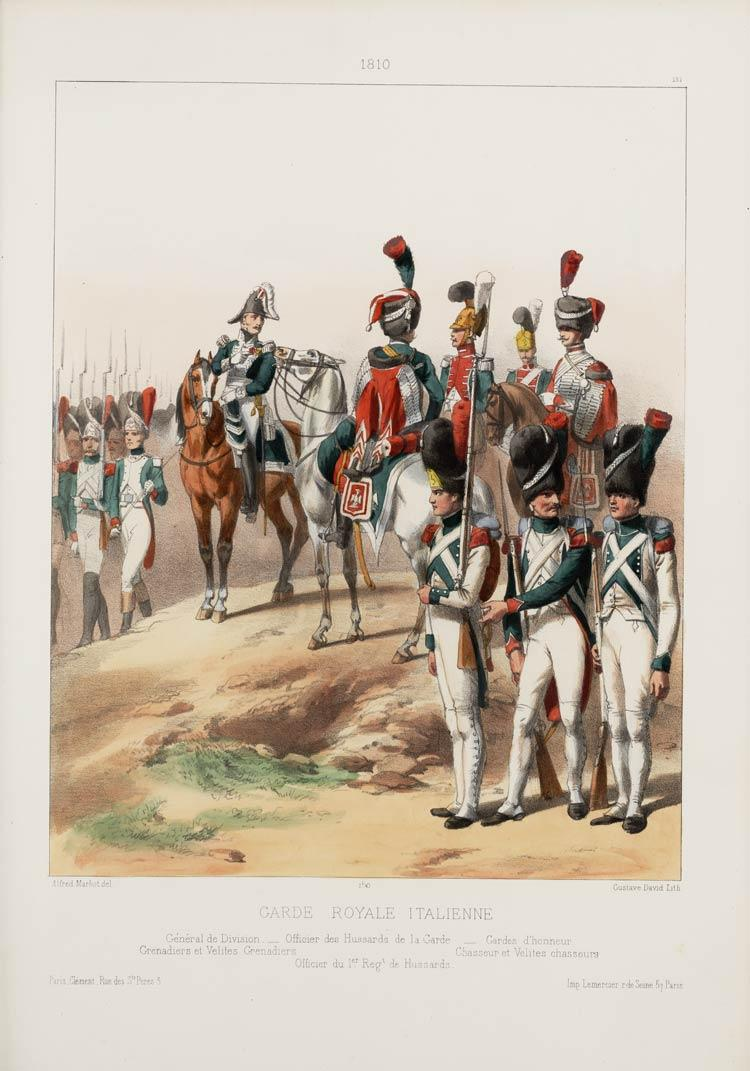
Italy's Royal Guard.

In 1802, Napoleon established an Italian Republic, of which he was the President; on 17 March, 1805, he appointed himself King and thus the Napoleonic Kingdom of Italy was born. Inspired by the Imperial Guard, an elite Italian unit was created: the Royal Guard. During the War of the Third Coalition, some Italian troops fought at Verona, Castelfranco and Trento; and, most importantly, the gunners of Italy's Royal Guard, commanded by Teodoro Lechi, distinguished themselves in the victorious and decisive battle of Austerlitz against the Austro-Russian forces. In a bulletin after the event, Napoleon wrote that "the gunners of the Royal Guard covered themselves in glory at the Battle of Austerlitz, and earned the respect of all old French gunners. The Royal Guard has always fought alongside the Imperial Guard and has proved worthy of it everywhere".

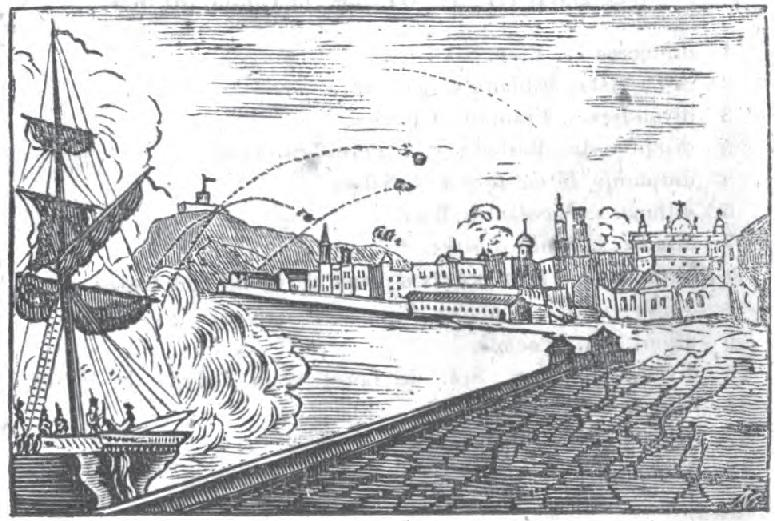
The blockade of Barcelona.

When the War of the Fourth Coalition started, mixed Franco-Italian units occupied Dalmatia, defended Ragusa from a Russian siege, and finally defeated a Russo-Montenegrin force in the battle of Castelnuovo (1806). Italian troops led by Pietro Teulié, and, after his death, by Filippo Severoli, took part in the siege of Kolberg against the Prussians. Giuseppe Federico Palombini, commander of the dragoon regiment "Napoleone", played a role in the siege of Stralsund against Swedish forces. During the Peninsular War, Italian forces under Teodoro Lechi defended Barcelona by multiple Anglo-Spanish attacks until another Italian division led by Domenico Pino put an end to the siege of the city (1808).

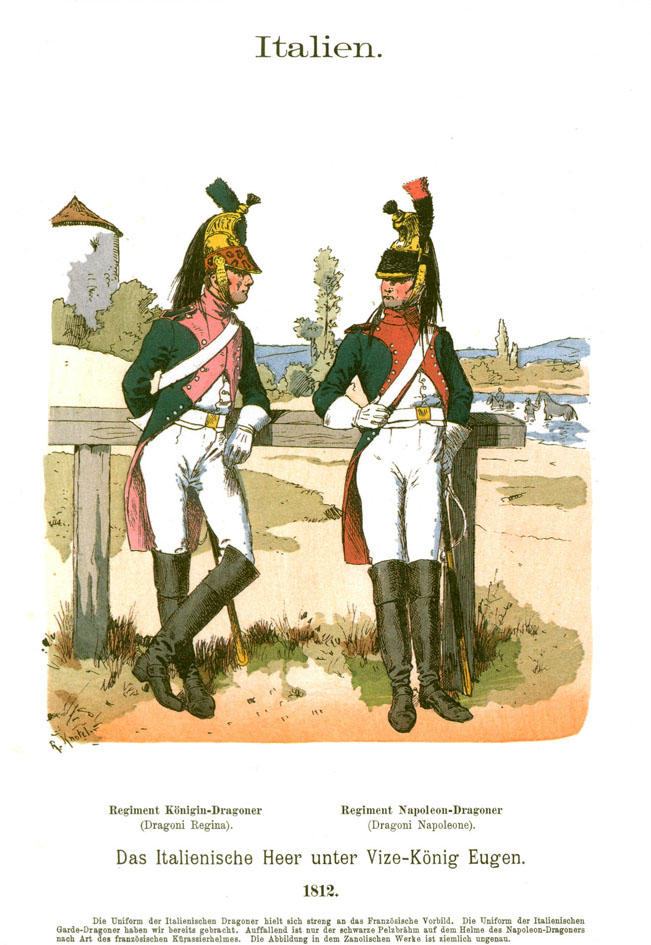
Dragoons of the Italian kingdom.

Italian troops achieved some of their most significant victories in the War of the Fifth Coalition (1809). They were under the command of Eugène (Eugenio) Beauharnais, Napoleon's stepson and viceroy of Italy. The Italians, despite initial setbacks at Sacile and Castelcerino, beat the Austrian armies in the battles of Piave river, Tarvisio and Raab. Thus they were able to join French troops in the battle of Wagram, where Napoleon personally commanded a column largely made up of Italian forces (Royal Guard and cavalry) in the final and decisive charge.

Napoleon often told Italian troops: "You have the blood of the Romans in your veins… You must never forget this". A large Italian contingent took part in the Russian campaign of 1812. It saved Napoleon in the Battle of Maloyaroslavets, which became known as the "battle of the Italians". The ultimate retreat was catastrophic, of the 27,000-34,000 Italian soldiers involved in the war, only a few thousands returned home. Toward the end of the War of the Sixth Coalition, Napoleon discharged Italian troops, commenting "The notable services that the Italians have rendered me in this campaign have filled me with joy...their intrepid conduct, the steadfastness shown amidst setbacks and misfortunes of every kind....All of this has confirmed to me that the blood of the rulers of the world still courses through your veins...I shared the prejudice of contempt toward the Neapolitan troops: they have filled me with wonder at Lützen, at Bautzen, in Danzig, at Leipzig, and at Hanau". In April 1814, Napoleon abdicated as Emperor of the French and as King of Italy. The Kingdom of Italy collapsed; some Italian units, such as the Tirailleurs du Po, fought in the French army at the battle of Waterloo. The Congress of Vienna initiated the Restoration era.

=== Italian unification ===
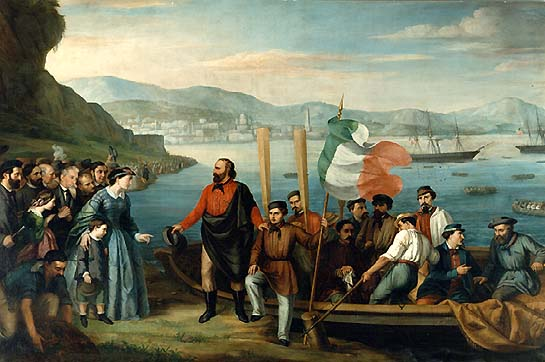
Giuseppe Garibaldi leading the Expedition of the Thousand.

The unification of Italy, also known as the Risorgimento (Italian: [risordʒiˈmento]); lit. 'Resurgence'), was the 19th century political and social movement that in 1861 resulted in the consolidation of various states of the Italian Peninsula and its outlying isles into a single state, the Kingdom of Italy. Inspired by the rebellions in the 1820s and 1830s against the outcome of the Congress of Vienna, the unification process was precipitated by the Revolutions of 1848, and reached completion in 1871 after the capture of Rome and its designation as the capital of the Kingdom of Italy.

Individuals who played a major part in the struggle for unification and liberation from foreign domination included King Victor Emmanuel II of Italy, Camillo Benso, Count of Cavour, Giuseppe Garibaldi, and Giuseppe Mazzini. Borrowing from the old Latin title Pater Patriae of the Roman emperors, the Italians gave to Victor Emmanuel II the epithet of Father of the Fatherland (Italian: Padre della Patria). After his death, many initiatives were destined to raise a permanent monument that celebrated the first king of a united Italy. The result was the construction of the Victor Emmanuel II Monument in Rome, called for synecdoche Altare della Patria (English: Altar of the Fatherland). The Victor Emmanuel II Monument holds the Tomb of the Italian Unknown Soldier with an eternal flame, built under the statue of goddess Roma after World War I following an idea of General Giulio Douhet.

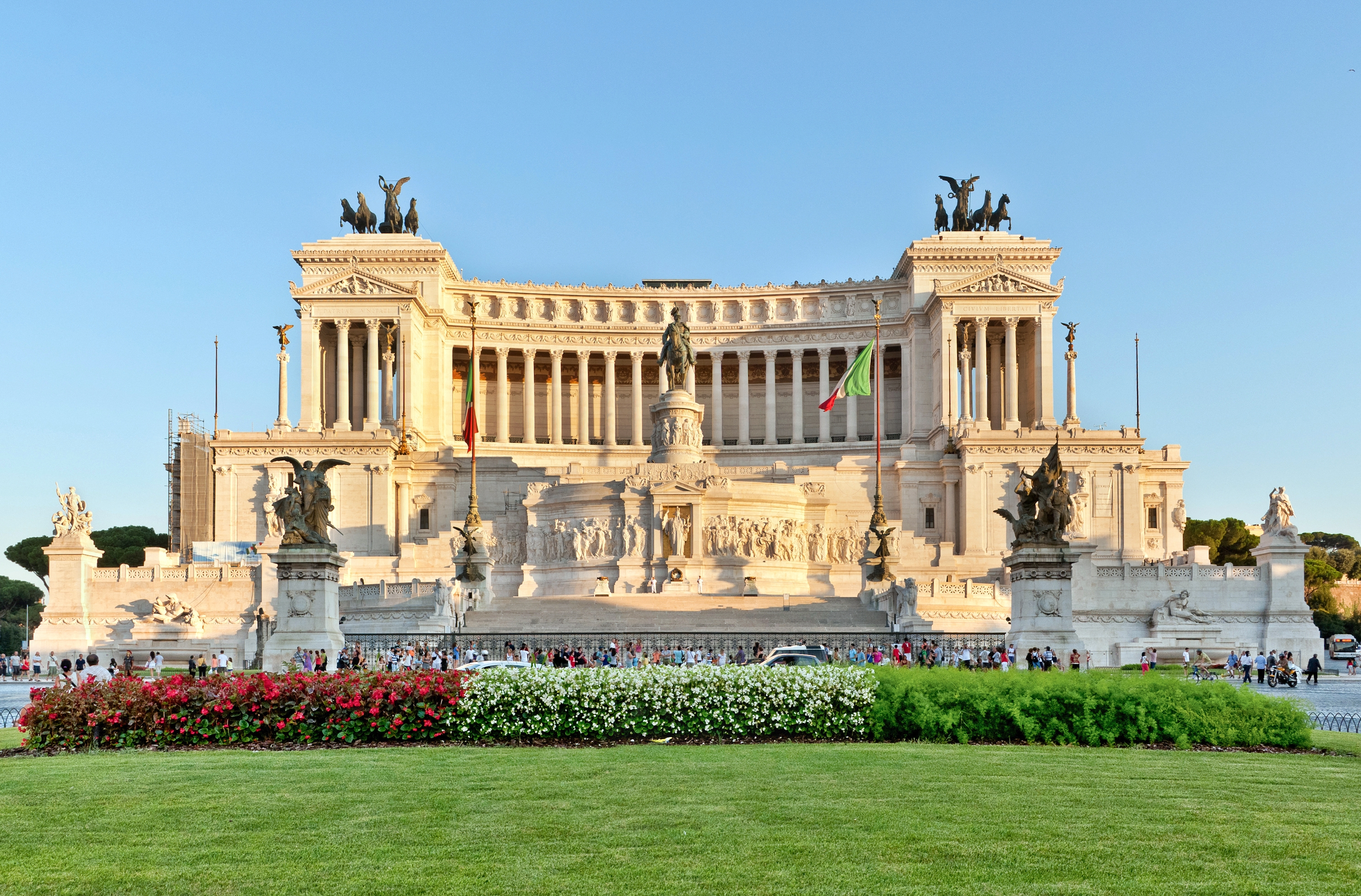
The Victor Emmanuel II Monument in Rome, a national symbol of Italy celebrating the first king of the unified country, and resting place of the Italian Unknown Soldier since the end of World War I. It was inaugurated in 1911, on the occasion of the 50th Anniversary of the Unification of Italy.

The First (1848–1849), Second (1859) and Third Italian War of Independence (1866) were fought against the Austrian Empire as part of the process to unify the Italian peninsula. The Expedition of the Thousand took place in 1860 in order to conquer the Kingdom of the Two Sicilies, ruled by the House of Bourbon-Two Sicilies. The name of the expedition derives from the initial number of participants, which was around 1,000 people. The Garibaldians, with the contribution of southern volunteers and reinforcements to the expedition, increased in number, creating the Southern Army. After a campaign of a few months with some victorious battles against the Bourbon army, the Thousand and the newborn southern army managed to conquer the entire Kingdom of the Two Sicilies.

Some of the states that had been envisaged as part of the unification process (terre irredente) did not join the Kingdom until after Italy defeated Austria-Hungary in the First World War, culminating in the Treaty of Rapallo in 1920. Some historians see the Risorgimento as continuing to that time, which is the view presented at the Central Museum of the Risorgimento at Altare della Patria in Rome.

The Kingdom of Italy did not participate in the Franco-Prussian War of 1870–1871, but the defeat of France and the abdication of French emperor Napoleon III enabled Italy to capture Rome (the city was de jure declared the capital of Italy in 1861), the last remnant of the Papal States (ruled by the Catholic church). The military and political protection provided to the Papal States by Napoleon III had until then prevented this.

=== Early colonial campaigns ===
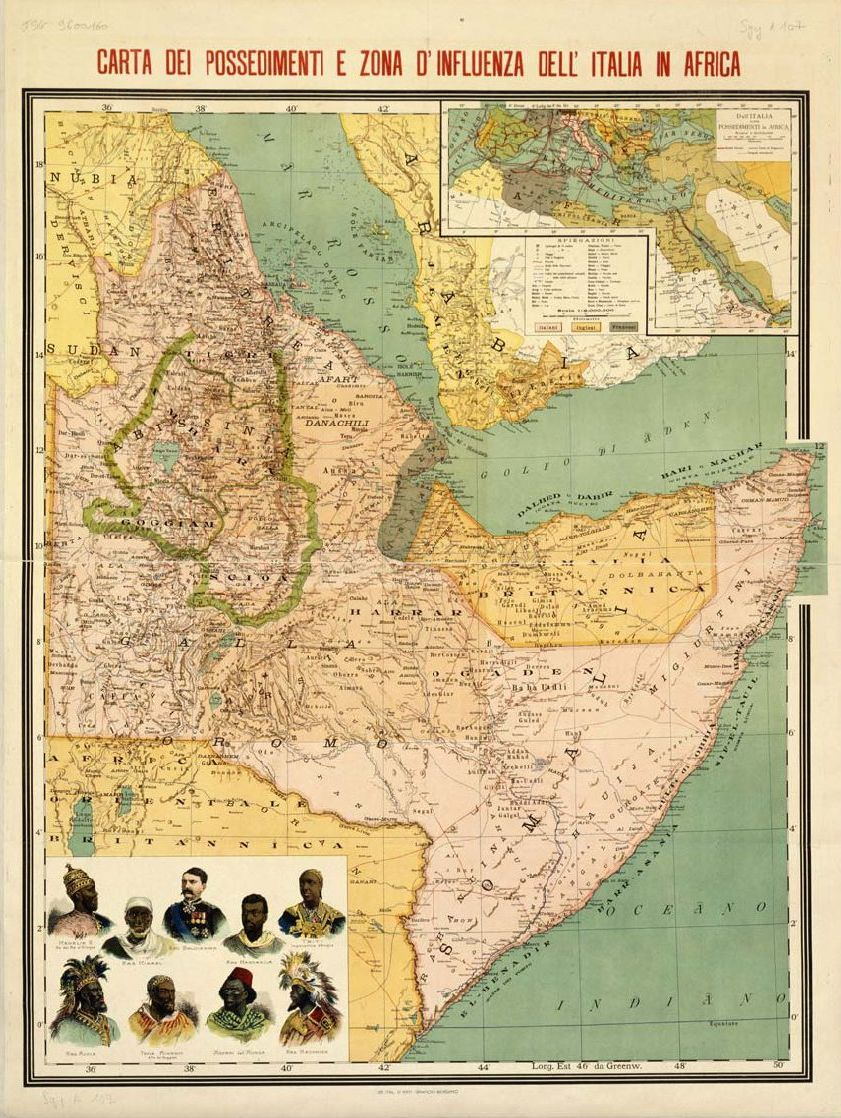
Italian possessions and spheres of influence in the Horn of Africa in 1896

In the late 19th and early 20th century, Italy emulated the other Great Powers in acquiring colonies, especially in the scramble to take control of Africa that took place in the 1870s. Italy, as the "least of the great powers", did not have the military and economic resources of Britain, France and Germany. Colonialism was seen by some as an opportunity to expand commercial networks, whilst others viewed it as unprofitable due to high military costs and the lesser economic value of spheres of influence remaining when Italy began to colonize. Britain was eager to block French influence and assisted Italy in gaining territory of the Red Sea.

Several colonial projects were undertaken by the government. These were done to gain the support of Italian nationalists and imperialists, who wanted to rebuild a Roman Empire. Italy had already large settlements in Alexandria, Cairo and Tunis. Italy first attempted to gain colonies through negotiations with other world powers to make colonial concessions, but these negotiations failed. Italy also sent missionaries to uncolonized lands to investigate the potential for Italian colonization. The most promising and realistic of these were parts of Africa. Italian missionaries had already established a foothold at Massawa (in present-day Eritrea) in the 1830s and had entered deep into the Ethiopian Empire.

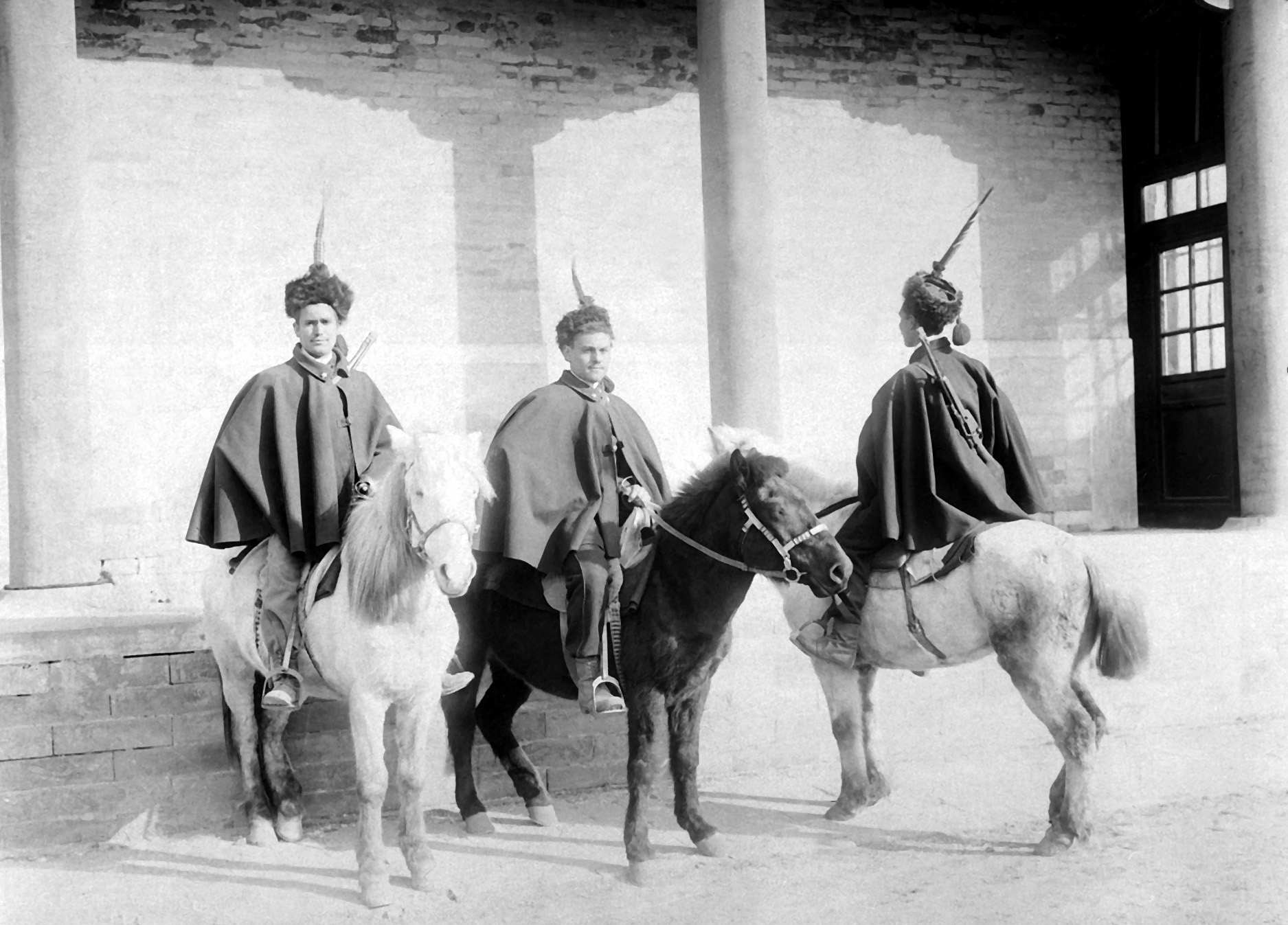
Italian mounted infantry in China during the Boxer Rebellion in 1900

=== Eritrean war ===
The beginning of Italian colonialism came in 1885, shortly after the fall of Egyptian rule in Khartoum, when Italy landed soldiers at Massawa in East Africa. From 1885 to 1889, Italy annexed Massawa, Keren and Asmara by force, creating the colony of Italian Eritrea. The Eritrean ports of Massawa and Assab handled trade with Italy and Ethiopia. The trade was promoted by the low duties paid on Italian trade. Italy exported manufactured products and imported coffee, beeswax and hides. At the same time, Italy occupied territory on the south side of the horn of Africa, forming what would become Italian Somaliland.

The Treaty of Wuchale, signed in 1889, gave Italy ownership of the Eritrean highlands and stated in the Italian language version that Ethiopia was to become an Italian protectorate, while the Ethiopian Amharic language version stated that the Ethiopian Emperor Menelik II could go through Italy to conduct foreign affairs. This happened presumably due to the mistranslation of a verb, which formed a permissive clause in Amharic and a mandatory one in Italian.

During the Mahdist war, Italian troops defeated Dervish troops in the Battle of Serobeti and the First Battle of Agordat. In December 1893, Italian colonial troops and Mahdists fought again in the Second Battle of Agordat; Ahmed Ali campaigned against the Italian forces in eastern Sudan and led about 10,000–12,000 men east from Kassala, encountering 2,400 Italians and their Eritrean Ascaris commanded by Colonel Arimondi. The Italians won again, and the outcome of the battle constituted "the first decisive victory yet won by Europeans against the Sudanese revolutionaries". A year later, Italian colonial forces seized Kassala after the successful Battle of Kassala to prevent new Mahdist attacks on Eritrea (Kassala was sold to the Anglo-Egyptians in 1897). Tigrayan invasion forces were defeated and repelled by the Italians in the battles of Halai, Qoatit and Senafé in late 1894 and early 1895.

=== First Italo-Ethiopian war ===
Meanwhile, the differences in the versions of the Wuchale had come to light, in 1895 Menelik II abrogated the treaty and abandoned the agreement to follow Italian foreign policy. Because of the Ethiopian refusal to abide by the Italian version of the treaty and despite economic handicaps at home, the Italian government decided on a military solution to force Ethiopia to abide by the Italian version of the treaty. In doing so, they believed that they could exploit divisions within Ethiopia and rely on tactical and technological superiority to offset any inferiority in numbers. As a result, Italy and Ethiopia came into confrontation, in what was later to be known as the First Italo-Ethiopian War. The Italian army (about 17,000 soldiers) was overwhelmed on the battlefield by a huge Ethiopian army (about 100,000 troops, 70,000 of which equipped with rifles) at the Battle of Adwa. At that point, the Italian invasion force was forced to retreat into Eritrea, while general Antonio Baldissera replaced Oreste Baratieri. Baldissera successfully defended Eritrea, sending reinforcements that rescued Italian troops besieged at Adigrat by the Ethiopians and in Kassala by the Mahdists. The war formally ended with the Treaty of Addis Ababa in 1896, which abrogated the Treaty of Wuchale, recognizing Ethiopia as an independent country while confirming Eritrea as Italian with the border fixed on the Mareb river.

=== Somalia and Tientsin ===
At the end of the century, the Italian colonial empire included Eritrea and parts of Somalia. From 2 November 1899 to 7 September 1901, Italy participated as part of the Eight-Nation Alliance forces during the Boxer Rebellion in China. On 7 September 1901, a concession in Tientsin was ceded to Italy by the Qing Dynasty. On 7 June 1902, the concession was taken into Italian possession and administered by an Italian consul.

== 20th century ==
=== Italo-Ottoman war ===
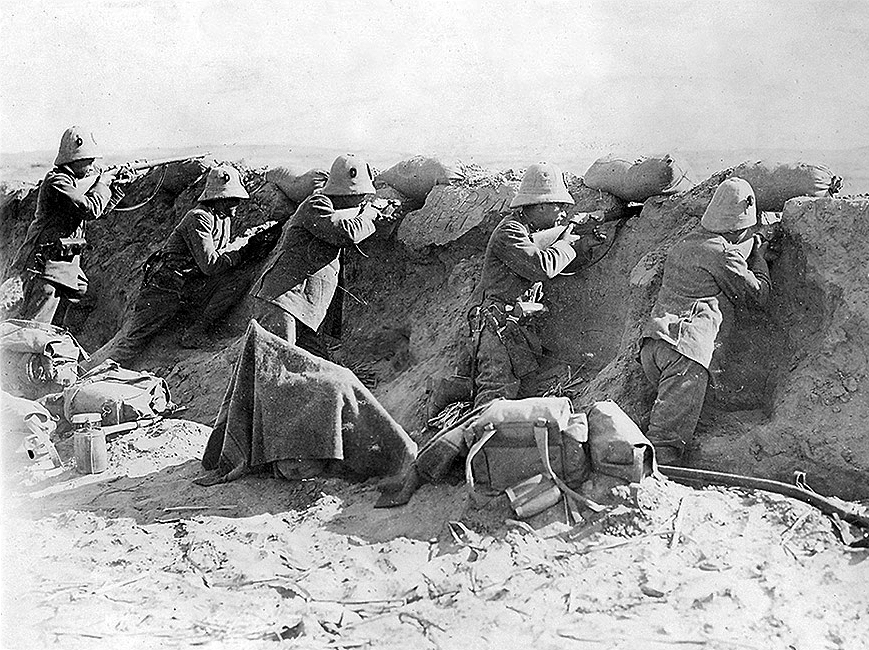
Italian troops during the Italo-Turkish War, 1911.

In 1911, Italy declared war on the Ottoman Empire and invaded Tripolitania, Fezzan and Cyrenaica. These provinces together formed what became known as Libya. The war ended only one year later, but the occupation resulted in acts of discrimination against Libyans, such as the forced deportation of Libyans to the Tremiti Islands in October 1911. By 1912, one-third of these Libyan refugees had died from a lack of food and shelter. The annexation of Libya led some Italian nationalists to advocate for further expansion in the Mediterranean Sea.

=== World War I ===
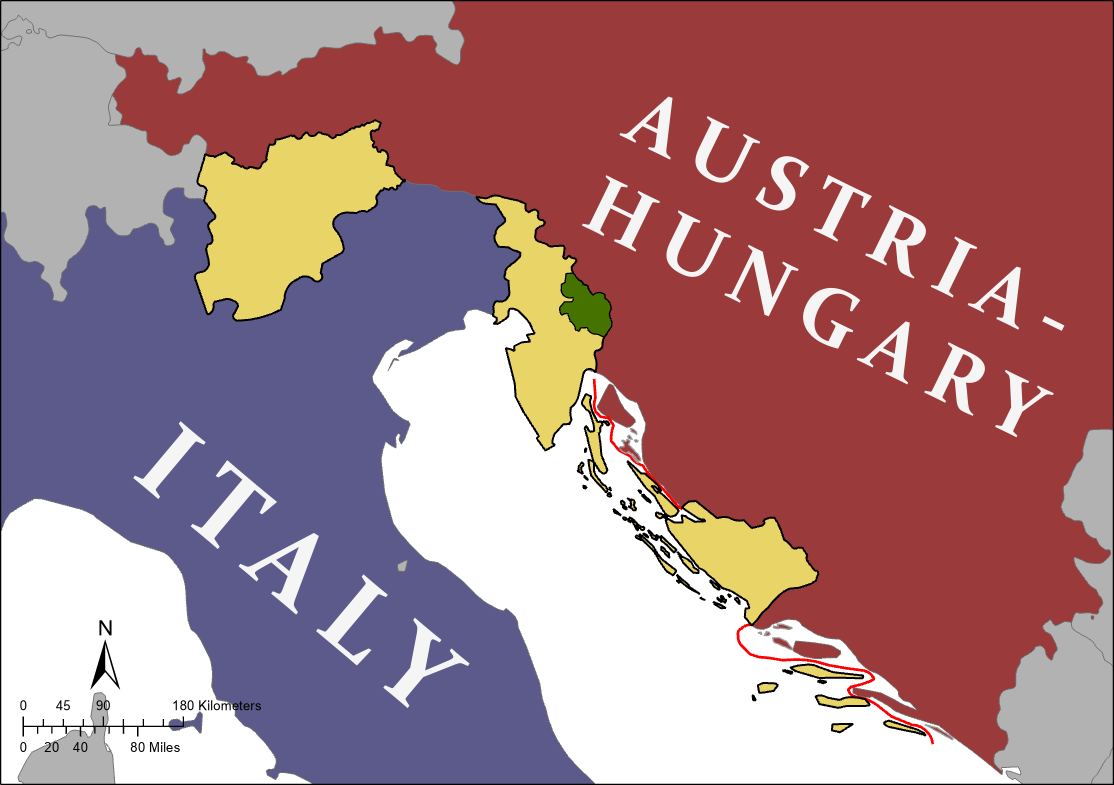
Territories promised to Italy by the Treaty of London (1915), i.e. Trentino-Alto Adige, the Julian March and Dalmatia (tan), and the Snežnik Plateau area (green). Dalmatia, after World War I, however, was not assigned to Italy but to Yugoslavia.

In spite of its official status as member of the Triple Alliance together with Germany and Austria-Hungary, in the years before the outbreak of the conflict the Italian government had enhanced its diplomatic efforts towards United Kingdom and France. This was because the Italian government had grown convinced that a support of Austria (which had been also the traditional enemy of Italy during the 19th century Risorgimento) would not grant to Italy the Italian-speaking lands the country was aiming for in its territorial expansion: mainly the provinces od Trieste and Trento, and possibly also South Tyrol, Istria, Zara and Dalmatia, all Austrian possessions. In fact, a secret agreement signed with France in 1902 practically nullified Italy's membership in the Triple Alliance.

A few days after the outbreak of the conflict, on 3 August 1914, the government, led by the conservative Antonio Salandra, declared that Italy would not commit its troops, maintaining that the Triple Alliance had only a defensive stance, whereas Austria-Hungary had been the aggressor. In reality, both Salandra and the minister of Foreign Affairs, Sidney Sonnino, started diplomatic activities to probe which side was ready to grant the best reward for Italy's entrance in the war. Although the majority of the cabinet (including former Prime Minister Giovanni Giolitti) was firmly contrary to the intervention, numerous intellectuals, including socialists such as Ivanoe Bonomi, Leonida Bissolati and Benito Mussolini, declared in favour of the intervention, which was then mostly supported by the Nationalist and the Liberal parties.

The diplomatic moves led to the London Pact (26 April 1915), signed by Sonnino without the approval of the Italian Parliament. By the Pact, in case of victory Italy was to be given Trentino and the South Tyrol up to the Brenner Pass, the entire Austrian Littoral (with Trieste, Gorizia-Gradisca and Istria, but without Fiume), parts of western Carniola (Idrija and Ilirska Bistrica) and north-western Dalmatia with Zadar and most of the islands, but without Split. Other agreements concerned the sovereignty of the port of Valona, the province of Antalya in Turkey and part of the German colonies in Africa.

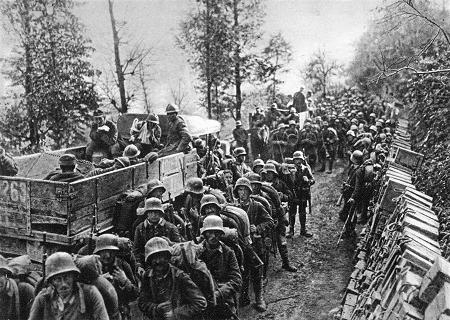
The Battle of Caporetto, fought in October and November 1917, the greatest defeat in Italian military history. Generalissimo Luigi Cadorna was forced to resign after the defeat, being replaced by Armando Diaz as Chief of Staff of the Italian Army

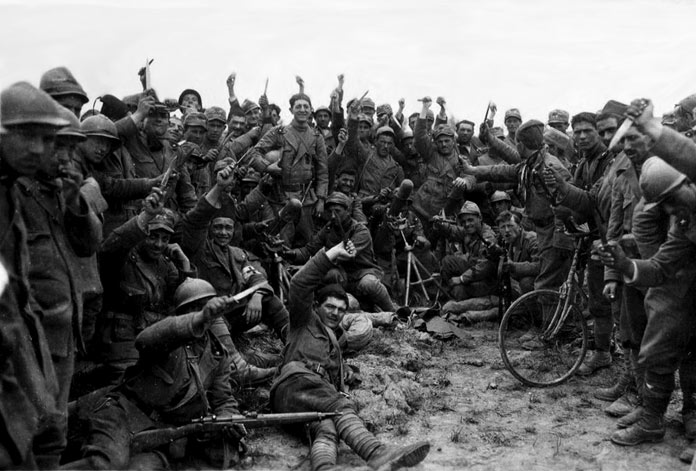
Members of the Arditi corps in 1918. More than 650,000 Italian soldiers died on the battlefields of World War I.

Italy entered into World War I also with the aim of completing national unity with the annexation of Trentino-Alto Adige and Julian March: for this reason, the Italian intervention in the First World War is also considered the Fourth Italian War of Independence, in a historiographical perspective that identifies in the latter the conclusion of the unification of Italy, whose military actions began during the revolutions of 1848 with the First Italian War of Independence.

Germany and Austria-Hungary had only advanced the possibility of negotiating parts of the Trentino and Eastern Friuli, without Gorizia and Trieste. The offer of the French colony of Tunisia was deemed unsatisfactory.

In April 1915 Italy joined the Entente and on 3 May 1915 officially rejected the Triple Alliance. In the following days Giolitti and the neutralist majority of the Parliament fought to keep Italy out of the conflict, while the nationalists demonstrated in the squares in favour of entrance into the war (the nationalist poet Gabriele D'Annunzio defined them le radiose giornate di Maggio - "the sunny days of May"). On 13 May Salandra presented his resignation to King Victor Emmanuel III. Giolitti, fearful of a further blow to governing institutions, declined to succeed as prime minister and also resigned. Italy thenceforth entered the war under the impetus of a relative minority of its population and politicians.

The front on the Austro-Hungarian border was 650 km (400 mi) long, stretching from the Stelvio Pass to the Adriatic Sea. Italian forces were numerically superior but this advantage was negated by the difficult terrain.

The first shells were fired in the dawn of 24 May 1915 against the enemy positions of Cervignano del Friuli, which was captured a few hours later. On the same day the Austro-Hungarian fleet bombarded the railway stations of Manfredonia and Ancona. The first Italian casualty was Riccardo Di Giusto. The main effort was to be concentrated in the Isonzo and Vipava valleys and on the Karst Plateau, in the direction of Ljubljana. The Italian troops had some initial successes, but as in the Western Front, the campaign soon evolved into trench warfare. The main difference was that the trenches had to be dug in the Alpine rocks and glaciers instead of in the mud, and often up to 3,000 m (9,800 ft) of altitude.

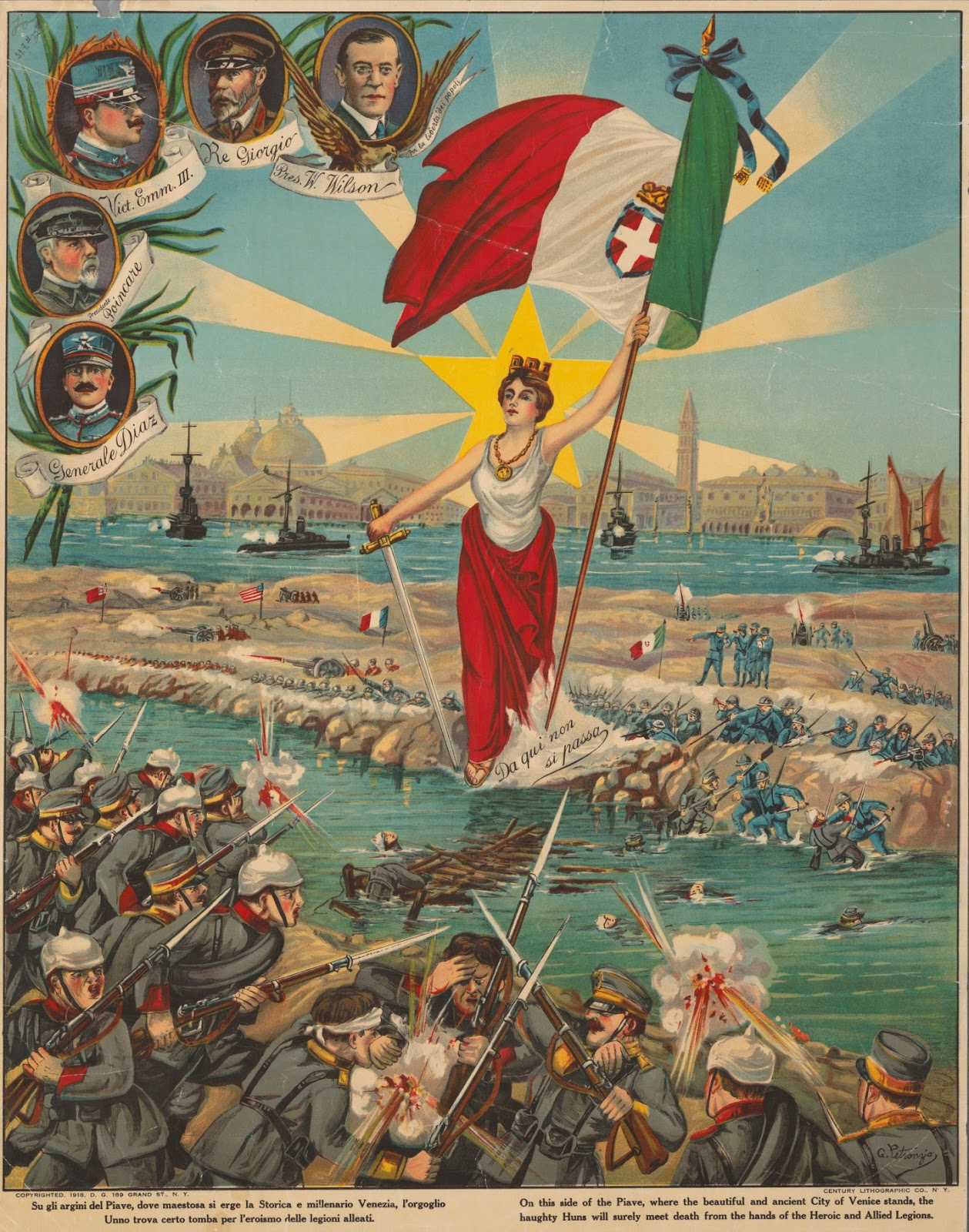
Italian propaganda poster depicting the Battle of the Piave River, fought in June 1918. This battle, won by Italy, was the beginning of the end of the Austro-Hungarian Empire.

==== 1915 operations ====
The Italian government declared war on May 24, 1915. Hostilities began along the entire front. Cadorna's plan included an offensive on the Julian front (main action), defense in Trentino (secondary action), and other limited actions in the area of Cadore and Carnia. The advance began from Cadore to the sea with offensive intent and in Trentino to improve the border's defensive conditions. The terrain along the Italo-Austrian border (from Trentino to the Isonzo) was unsuited for offensive warfare by being mountainous and broken, with little room for manoeuvring.

In the first phase, from late May to late June, Italian troops occupied the southern part of the Trentino salient, the basins of Fiera di Primiero and Cortina d’Ampezzo, the border passes in Carnia, the Plezzo basin, and much of the right bank of the Isonzo; they also conquered Monte Nero (2245 mts), Monte Maggio, Monfalcone, Grado, Gradisca and created a bridghead at Plava.

Cadorna then ordered a series of operations on the Julian front, where Italy could attack with two armies (the 2nd and 3rd) and Austria defended with one (the 5th). Despite the numerical inferiority of their troops, the Austrians were in a strong defensive position because of the nature of trench warfare, their optimal artillery and machine guns, and the local terrain disadvantaging attackers. Cadorna opted to attack mainly in that direction since the remaining portions of the Italo-Austrian front were judged even more prohibitive. After the Italian occupation of Sagrado and some other minor positions, the First Battle of the Isonzo (from 23 June to 7 July) ended creating a stalemate, with high losses (dead, wounded or missing) on both sides: 14,917 Italians and 10,400 Austro-Hungarians.

Between July 24 and August 3, Italy's second Isonzo offensive took place. On the Karst, the Italian line advanced to the western slopes of Mount San Michele and east of Mount Nero. Italian troops made several tactical conquests and defended them from Austrian counter-attacks. The Italians gained Monte Rosso (2164 mts), Bosco Cappuccio and the nearby area, Castelnuovo, one of the two peaks (Hill 111) of mount Sei Busi, and the edge of the Doberdò plateau. The battle caused the two attacking Italian armies approximately 42,000 men dead, wounded, and missing; the 5th Austrian Army had over 47,000 casualties, losses that were judged "terrifying" by the Austrian generals in the aftermath of the battle. Cadorna ordered an operational pause to fill the ranks of the regiments with new reinforcements and wait for the arrival of field artillery.

The so-called Third and Fourth Battles on the Isonzo formed a single offensive from late October to early December, with a six-day pause between November 4 and 10. The Italians captured tactically relevant positions, such as Oslavia (Hill 188) and Mount Calvario (Hill 184); they expanded their occupation toward Tolmino, made progress on the San Michele, and Italian artilleries were able to begin the bombardment of Gorizia. In the two battles, Italy's two attacking armies (the 2nd and 3rd) suffered more losses than Austria's Isonzo army in absolute terms, though Austrian casualties remained worse in percentage. Cadorna, therefore, persisted in his strategy of attrition and commented "the current war can only end through the exhaustion of men and resources, and Austria is closer to reaching that point than we are. It is terrifying, but it is the way it is."

==== 1916 ====
After a fifth and short-lived Italian attack on the Isonzo, the Austro-Hungarian Army launched the “punitive expedition” on the Asiago plateau, in mid-May 1916, to push the Italians back into the Venetian plain; this attack was followed by an Italian counter-offensive. Cadorna then ordered that forces exceeding defensive needs be transferred to the Isonzo front, planning to take the fortress of Gorizia, the capture of which would permit the Italian armies to pivot south and march on Trieste, or continue on to the Ljubljana Gap. To counter the new threat, the Austrians attacked at dawn on 29 June, on the Karst between San Michele and San Martino, deploying poison gas for the first time on the Italian front. The Sixth Battle of the Isonzo (6–17 August) led to the capture of Gorizia, the most significant success of Cadorna up to that point. Three more smaller battles were fought on the Isonzo in 1916 (the seventh from 14 to 17 September, the eighth from 10 to 12 October, the ninth from 1 to 4 November). With the arrival of winter, operations ceased along almost the entire front from the Stelvio to the sea.

==== 1917 ====
The first months of 1917 were marked by severe weather, particularly in Carnia and Cadore, with heavy snowfall. Operational activity on both sides was limited to artillery duels and small raids to maintain offensive spirit. In spring, Cadorna ordered the resumption of fighting. His tenth offensive was fought from 12 to 28 May, during which the Italian army captured the Kuk-Vodice area. In August, Cadorna ordered the start of the Eleventh Battle, which allowed the Italian army to break through Austrian lines in the Bainsizza plateau and advance for 10-12 kms. About 6 million artillery shells were fired on the infantry of both armies, and more than 38% of Austrian guns were put out of action. Fearing that they would lose Trieste in case of another Italian offensive, the Austrians requested support from their German ally to launch a preemptive attack.

The Russian Empire collapsed in 1917 Russian Revolution, eventually resulting in the rise of the communist Bolshevik regime of Vladimir Lenin. The resulting marginalization of the Eastern Front allowed for more Austro-Hungarian and German forces to arrive on the front against Italy. Internal dissent against the war grew with increasingly poor economic and social conditions in Italy due to the strain of the war. Much of the profit of the war was being made in the cities, while rural areas were losing income. The number of men available for agricultural work had fallen from 4.8 million to 2.2 million, though with the help of women, agricultural production managed to be maintained at 90% of its pre-war total during the war. Many pacifists and internationalist Italian socialists turned to Bolshevism and advocated negotiations with the workers of Germany and Austria-Hungary to help end the war and bring about Bolshevik revolutions. Avanti!, the newspaper of the Italian Socialist Party, declared: "Let the bourgeoisie fight its war". Leftist women in Northern Italian cities led protests demanding action against the high cost of living and demanding an end to the war. In Milan in May 1917, communist revolutionaries organized and engaged in rioting, calling for an end to the war and managed to close down factories and stop public transportation. The Italian Army was forced to enter Milan with tanks and machine guns to face communists and anarchists who fought violently until 23 May, when the Army gained control of the city with almost 50 people killed (three of which were Italian soldiers) and over 800 people arrested.

After the disastrous Battle of Caporetto in 1917, Italian forces were forced far back into Italian territory as far as the Piave river. The humiliation led to the appointment of Vittorio Emanuele Orlando as Prime Minister, who managed to solve some of Italy's wartime problems. Orlando abandoned the previous isolationist approach to the war and increased coordination with the Allies. The convoy system was introduced to fend off submarine attacks and allowed Italy to end food shortages from February 1918 onward. Also, Italy received more raw materials from the Allies. The new Italian chief of staff, Armando Diaz, ordered the Army to defend the Monte Grappa summit, where fortified defences were constructed; despite numerically inferior, the Italians managed to repel the Austro-Hungarian and German Army. 1918 also saw the beginning of the official suppression of enemy aliens. The Italian government increasingly suppressed the Italian socialists.

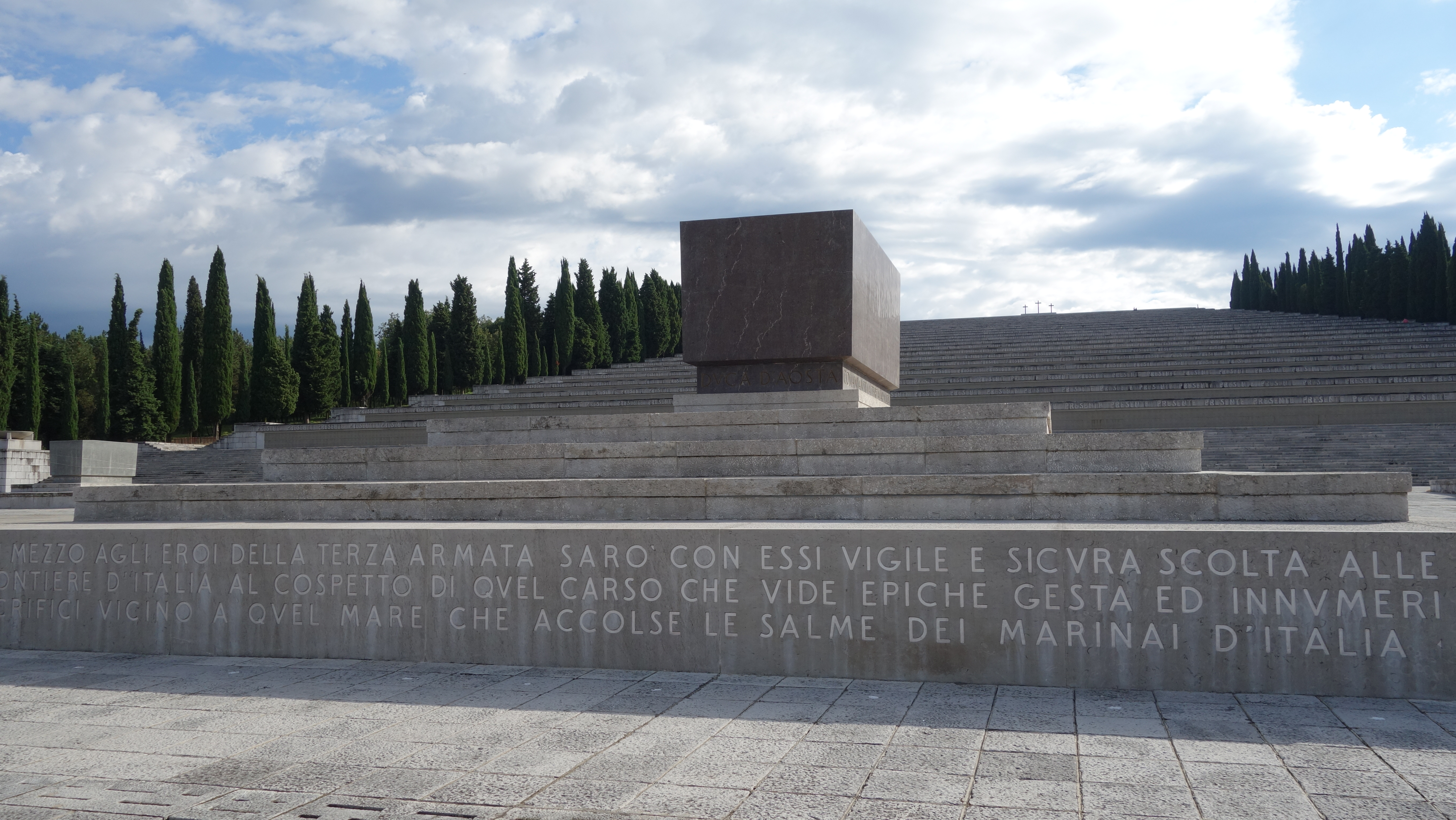
The Redipuglia War Memorial is a World War I memorial. It is the largest war memorial in Italy and one of the largest in the world.

==== Other theatres ====
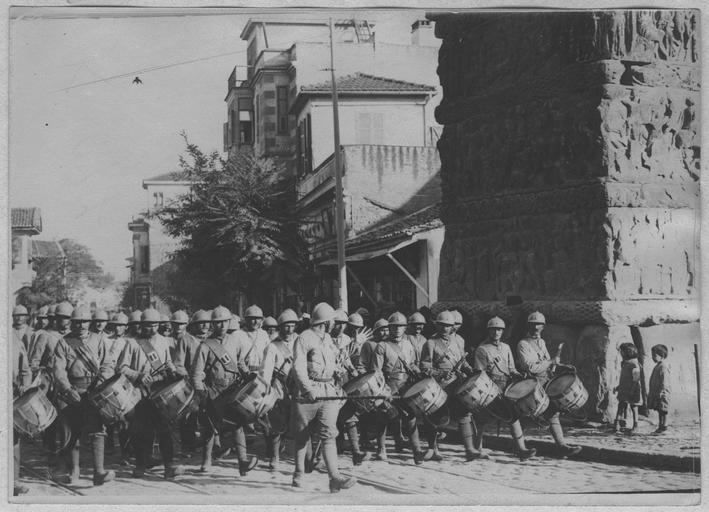
Italian troops in Thessaloniki, 1916

Italian troops played a major role in the defence of Albania against Austria-Hungary. From 1916 the Italian 35th Division fought on the Salonika front as part of the Allied Army of the Orient. The Italian XVI Corps (a separate entity independent from the Army of the Orient) took part in actions against Austro-Hungarian forces in Albania.

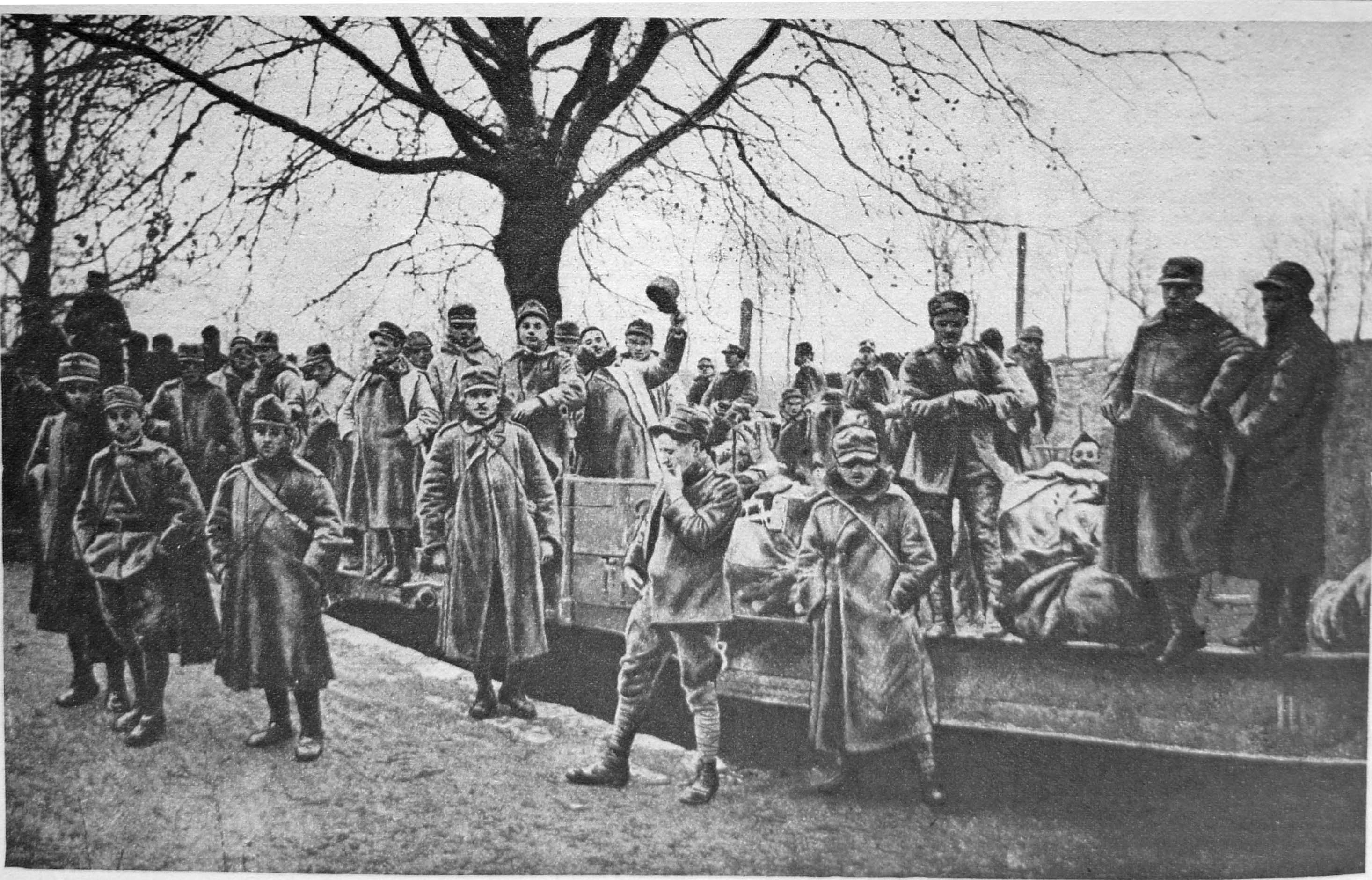
Arrival of Italian troops at the Western front

Some Italian divisions were also sent to support the entente on the Western Front. In 1918 Italian troops saw intense combat during the German spring offensive. Their most prominent engagement on this front was their role in the Second Battle of the Marne and in the 100 days offensive.

Italy played a token role in the Sinai and Palestine Campaign, sending a detachment of five hundred soldiers to assist the British there in 1917.

In Africa, Italy faced local movements supported by the Ottomans and Germans, fighting defensive campaigns to retain her colonial presence in Libya and Somalia. As a result of the 1911-1912 Italo-Turkish War, Italians acquired Tripolitaia and Cyrenaica from the Ottoman Empire, with their forces controlling the main centres of Libya, on the coast. Italy then began to expand into the interior but, preparing to enter World War I, cut its occupation force and was forced to retreat back to the coast after some reverses (near Mizda and Gasr Bu Hadi) and uprisings.

After Italy entered the war, the Ottoman sultan tasked Sayed Ahmed to recover Libya and supported (together with the Germans) the Senussi and other groups against the Italians. Ottoman–German operations were based at Misratah, where a submarine visited every couple of weeks to deliver arms and ammunition. The Italians retained their coastal strongholds and, in 1916, re-occupied Zuwarah in Tripolitania (followed in 1917 by Agilat, Sidi Bilal, Saiad and Janzur) and Bardia in Cyrenaica. In April 1917, the Accords of Acroma were signed between the Italians and the Senussi. The latter stopped conducting attacks on the Italians and ended their allegiance to the Ottomans. The armistice with the Ottoman empire and the Paris Peace conference, resulting in the treaty of Sevrès (1920), confirmed the Italian possession of Libya and deprived the Sultan of the religious role and rights (as caliph) he had retained in the area per the 1912 peace.

During World War I, the Dervishes (supported by the Ottomans) conducted raids into Italian-controlled territories, but were stopped by the garrisons of Bulo Burti and Tiyeglow; on 27 March 1916, thanks to the betrayal of some Somali irregulars hired into the service of the Italians, the dervishes sacked the fort of Bulo Burti. Italian officer Battistella was killed in this attack. After the recapture of Bulo Burti, an Italian column under captain Silvestri defeated and dispersed the Dervishes in the battle of Beledweyne (16 January 1917), which was the main base of operations against Italian Somaliland. The Italian column had light casualties (6 dead and 4 wounded), while the Dervishes suffered 50 dead and numerous wounded; furthermore, the Italians captured 200 camels, depriving Dervishes of their mobility. The Dervishes stopped conducting significant attacks on Italian Somaliland for the rest of World War I.

==== 1918 ====
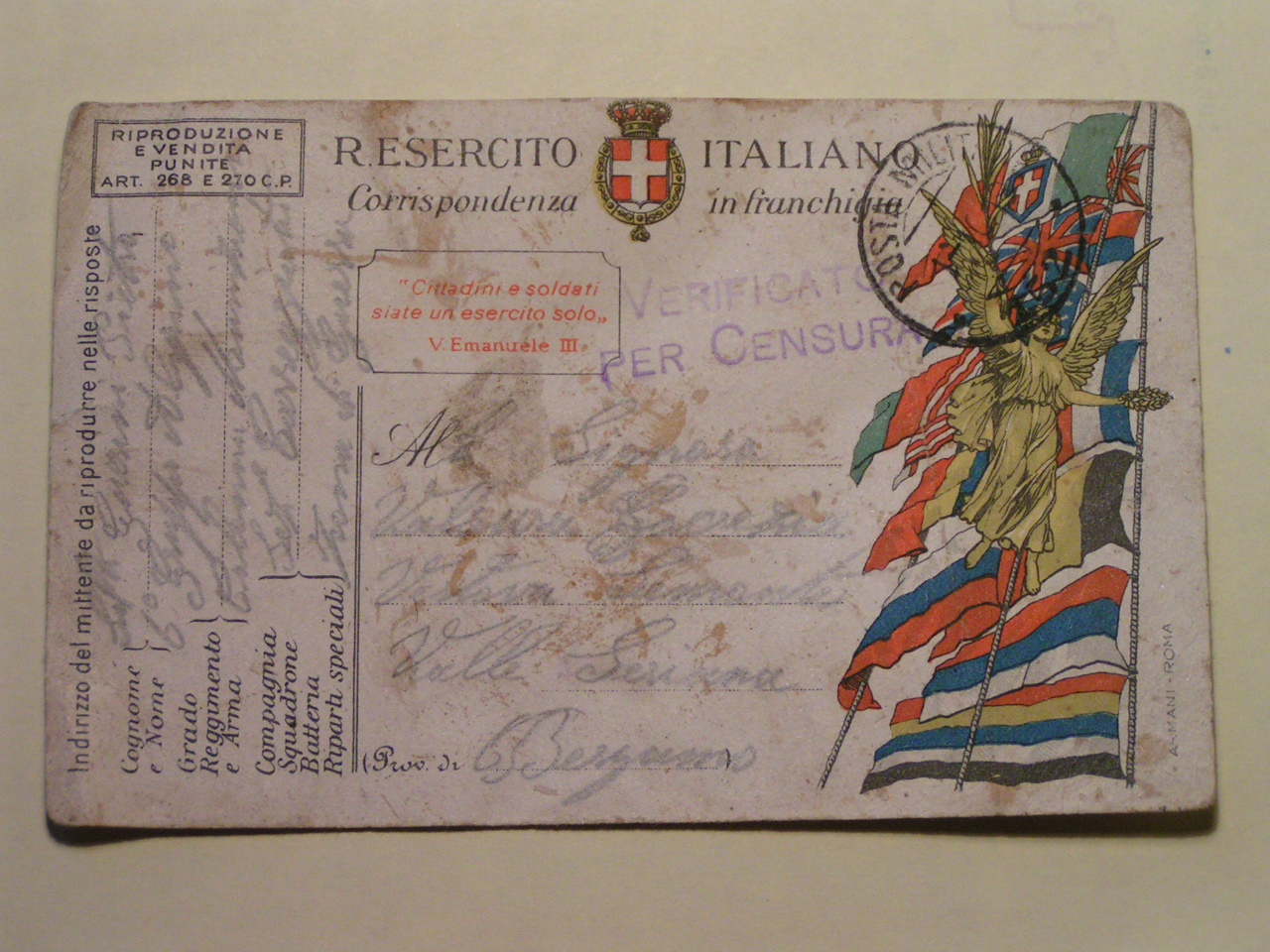
Postcard sent from an Italian soldier to his family, c. 1917

The Italians, who had retreated to defensive lines near Venice on the Piave River, had suffered 600,000 casualties to this point in the war. Because of these losses, the Italian Government called to arms the so-called 99 Boys (Ragazzi del '99); the new class of conscripts born in 1899 who were turning 18 in 1917. After the Italian had stopped the German-Austrian offensive at Monte Grappa, the Germans pulled out their troops from the Italian front, while British and French troops were sent to the Piave front line. (Note: The French units were (i) 12th Army Corps (France) (ii) 10th Army (France) and (iii) 31st Army Corps (France) comprising (1) 23rd Division, 24th Division, (2) 46th Division, 47th Division and (3) 64th Division, 65th Division respectively.) More important to the war effort than their troops was the Allies economic assistance by providing strategic materials (American aid, steel, coal and crops – provided by the British but imported from Argentina – etc.), which Italy lacked.

The Austro-Hungarians now began debating how to finish the war in Italy. The Austro-Hungarian generals disagreed on how to administer the final offensive. Archduke Joseph August of Austria decided for a two-pronged offensive, where it would prove impossible for the two forces to communicate in the mountains.

The offensive was renewed on 15 June 1918 with Austro-Hungarian troops launching the Second Battle of the Piave River. The battle began with a diversionary attack near the Tonale Pass named Lawine, which the Italians repulsed after two days of fighting. Austrian deserters betrayed the objectives of the upcoming offensive, which allowed the Italians to move two armies directly in the path of the Austrian prongs. The other prong, led by general Svetozar Boroević von Bojna initially experienced success until aircraft bombed their supply lines and Italian reinforcements arrived.

Italy's resistance to the assault and the failure of the offensive marked the swan song of Austria-Hungary on the Italian front; the Central Powers proved finally unable to sustain further initiatives.

After having defeated Austro-Hungarian troops during the Second Battle of the Piave River and recognizing the dire internal situation of Austria-Hungary caused by the course of the war and the blockade of the Adriatic at sea, the Royal Italian Army launched a major offensive: the Italian victory marked the end of the war on the Italian Front and the dissolution of the Austro-Hungarian Empire, contributing to the end of the First World War just one week later. The Italian victory, was announced by the Bollettino della Vittoria and the Bollettino della Vittoria Navale.

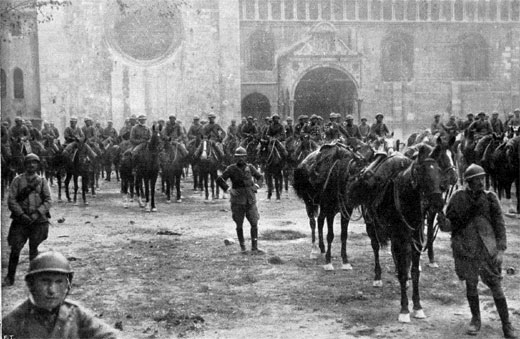
Italian cavalry in Trento on 3 November 1918, after the victorious Battle of Vittorio Veneto. The Italian victory in this battle marked the end of the war on the Italian Front, secured the dissolution of the Austro-Hungarian Empire and contributed to the end of World War I just one week later.

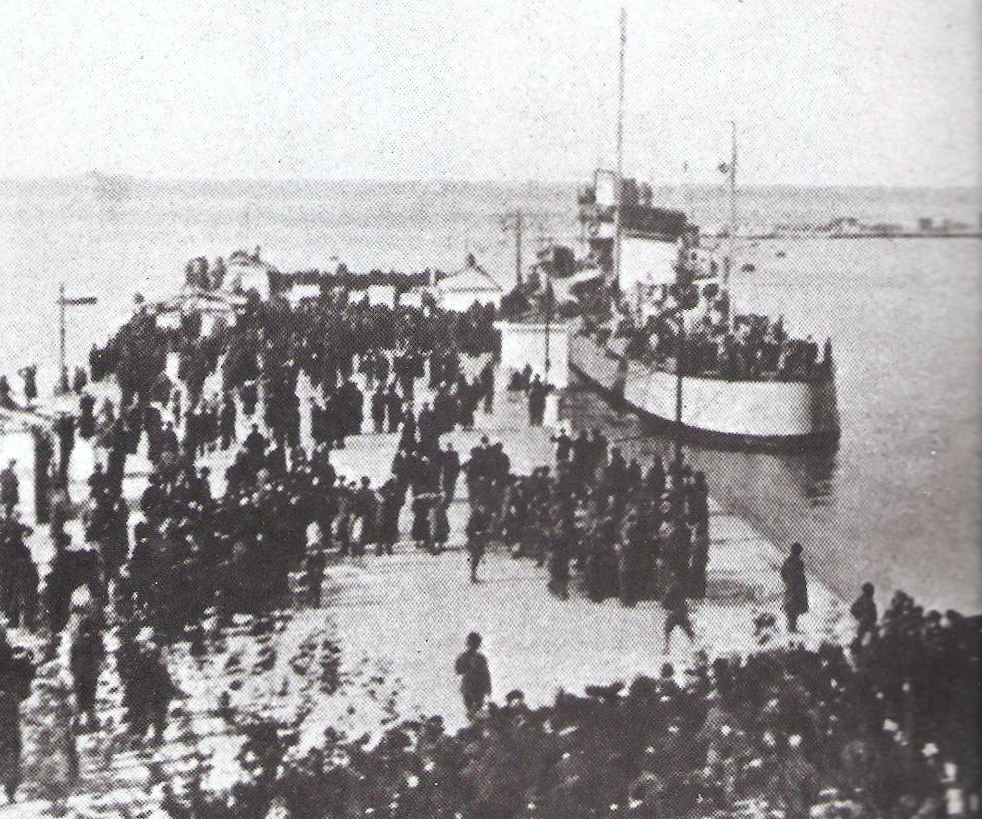
Italian troops landing in Trieste, 3 November 1918, after the Battle of Vittorio Veneto

During the war, the Italian Royal Army increased in size from 15,000 men in 1914 to 160,000 men in 1918, with 5 million recruits in total entering service during the war. This came at a terrible cost: by the end of the war, Italy had lost 700,000 soldiers and had a budget deficit of twelve billion lira. Italian society was divided between the majority of pacifists who opposed Italian involvement in the war and the minority of pro-war nationalists who had condemned the Italian government for not having immediately gone to war with Austria-Hungary in 1914.

In November 1918, after the surrender of Austria-Hungary, Italy occupied militarily Trentino Alto-Adige, the Julian March, Istria, the Kvarner Gulf and Dalmatia, all Austro-Hungarian territories. On the Dalmatian coast, Italy established the Governorate of Dalmatia, which had the provisional aim of ferrying the territory towards full integration into the Kingdom of Italy, progressively importing national legislation in place of the previous one. The administrative capital was Zara. The Governorate of Dalmatia was evacuated following the Italo-Yugoslav agreements which resulted in the Treaty of Rapallo (1920).

The complete unification of Italy took place only in 1918, after World War I. In this regard, the National Unity and Armed Forces Day (Victory Day) was established, which is celebrated annually on 4 November, recalling the Italian victory in World War I, a war event considered to complete the process of the unification of Italy.

=== Interwar period ===
==== Post-WW1 ====
The Treaty of Saint-Germain-en-Laye (1919) and Treaty of Rapallo (1920) allowed for annexation of Trentino Alto-Adige, the Julian March, Istria, the Kvarner Gulf and the Dalmatian city of Zara. The subsequent Treaty of Rome (1924) led to annexation of Fiume by Italy. Italy gained a permanent seat in the League of Nations's executive council.

Italy participated in the Allied intervention in the Russian Civil War (to try to subvert the October Revolution, or at least mitigate its outcomes perceived as unfavorable to national interests) with the Legione Redenta of Siberia, the Italian Expeditionary Force in the Far East and the Italian Expeditionary Force in Murmania.

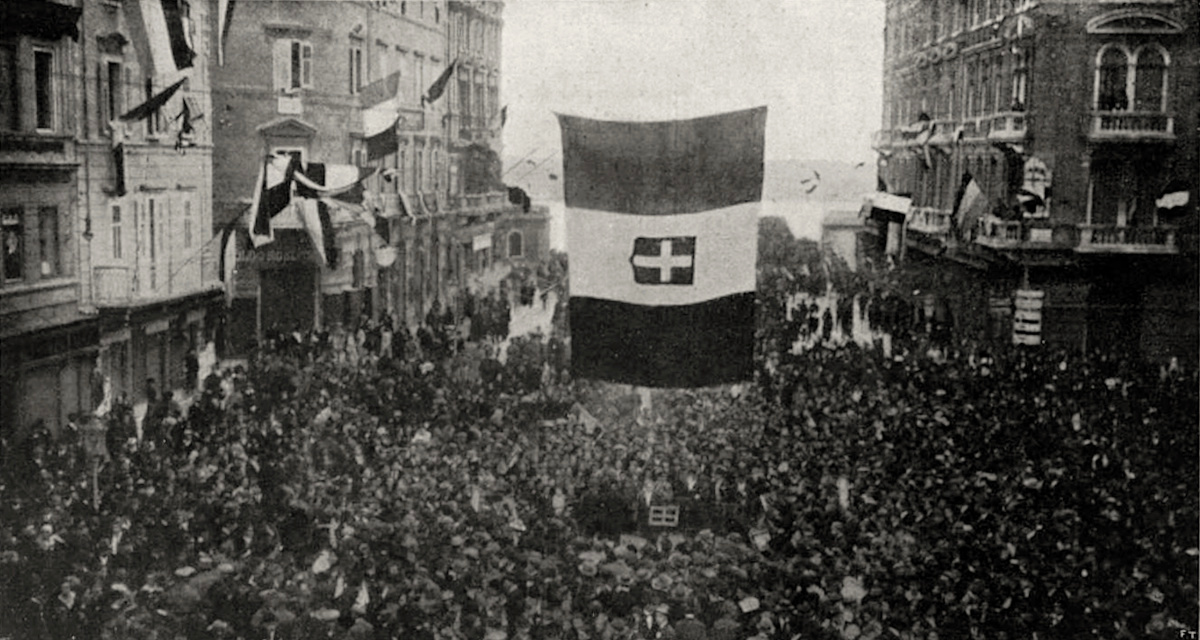
The birthday celebration of the Italian king Victor Emmanuel III in Fiume (Rijeka) on 11 November 1918

During World War I (1914–1918), which the Kingdom of Italy entered on the side of the Allies in May 1915, Italy made a pact with the Allies, the Treaty of London, in which it was promised all of the Austrian Littoral, but not the city of Fiume (known in Croatian as Rijeka). The Italians claimed Fiume on the principle of self-determination, disregarding its mainly Slavic suburb of Sušak. Austria-Hungary disintegrated in October 1918 during the final weeks of the war, which ended in the defeat of the Central Powers in November 1918. After the war, at the Paris Peace Conference in 1919, this delineation of territory was confirmed, with Fiume remaining outside of Italy's borders and amalgamated into the Kingdom of the Serbs, Croats and Slovenes (which in 1929 would be renamed the Kingdom of Yugoslavia).

As an Italian nationalist, the poet, playwright, orator, journalist, and aristocrat Gabriele D'Annunzio, who had served as an officer in the Italian Royal Army (Italian: Regio Esercito) during World War I, was angered by what he considered to be the surrender of an Italian city. On 12 September 1919, he led a force of about 2,500 so-called "legionaries" from Ronchi di Monfalcone in Italy to Fiume in what became known as the Impresa di Fiume ("Fiume endeavor" or "Fiume enterprise"). His legionaries mostly were former or serving members of the Royal Army's Granatieri di Sardegna Brigade, as well as Italian nationalists and irredentists, and many members of D'Annunzio's force reputedly were veterans of the Battles of the Isonzo on the Italian front during World War I. They were successful in seizing control of the city and forced the withdrawal of the Allied occupying forces, composed of troops from France, the United Kingdom, and the United States. The march from Ronchi di Monfalcone to Fiume became known as the Impresa di Fiume ("Fiume endeavor" or "Fiume enterprise"), and in 1925 Ronchi di Monfalcone was renamed Ronchi dei Legionari in honor of it.

The ethnic Italian portion of the population of Fiume welcomed D'Annunzio enthusiastically, and on the same day, he announced that he had annexed the territory to the Kingdom of Italy. The Italian government opposed this and attempted to pressure D'Annunzio into withdrawing by initiating a blockade of Fiume and demanding that the plotters surrender.

Fiume became a city that attracted artists and radicals from all over Europe. Guido Keller taught yoga to legionaries while Harukichi Shimoi taught karate. Vladimir Lenin sent D'Annunzio a box of caviar. During his time in Fiume in September 1919, the Italian poet, editor, and art theorist, Filippo Tommaso Marinetti, the founder of the Futurist movement, praised the leaders of the impresa as "advance-guard deserters" (disertori in avanti).

The approval of the Treaty of Rapallo on 12 November 1920 turned Fiume into an independent state, the Free State of Fiume. The Free State of Fiume lasted officially until 1924, when the Kingdom of Italy formally annexed it under the terms of the Treaty of Rome of 1924. Under the Kingdom of Italy, the administrative division previously represented by the Free State of Fiume became the province of Fiume.

In 1922, Benito Mussolini brought the fascist party to power in Italy with his March on Rome on 28 October. Mussolini repeatedly stated his dream of the Mediterranean Sea becoming an "Italian lake" (Mare Nostrum, "our sea") and valued war, saying "Though words are beautiful things, rifles, machine guns, planes, and cannon are still more beautiful". In the Corfu incident Italy forced Greece to pay reparations and apologize for the murder of an Italian general by bombarding and temporarily occupying the Greek island of Corfu. This incident was indicative of the aggressive posture of the new Fascist regime.

==== Conquest of Ethiopia (1935–1936) ====
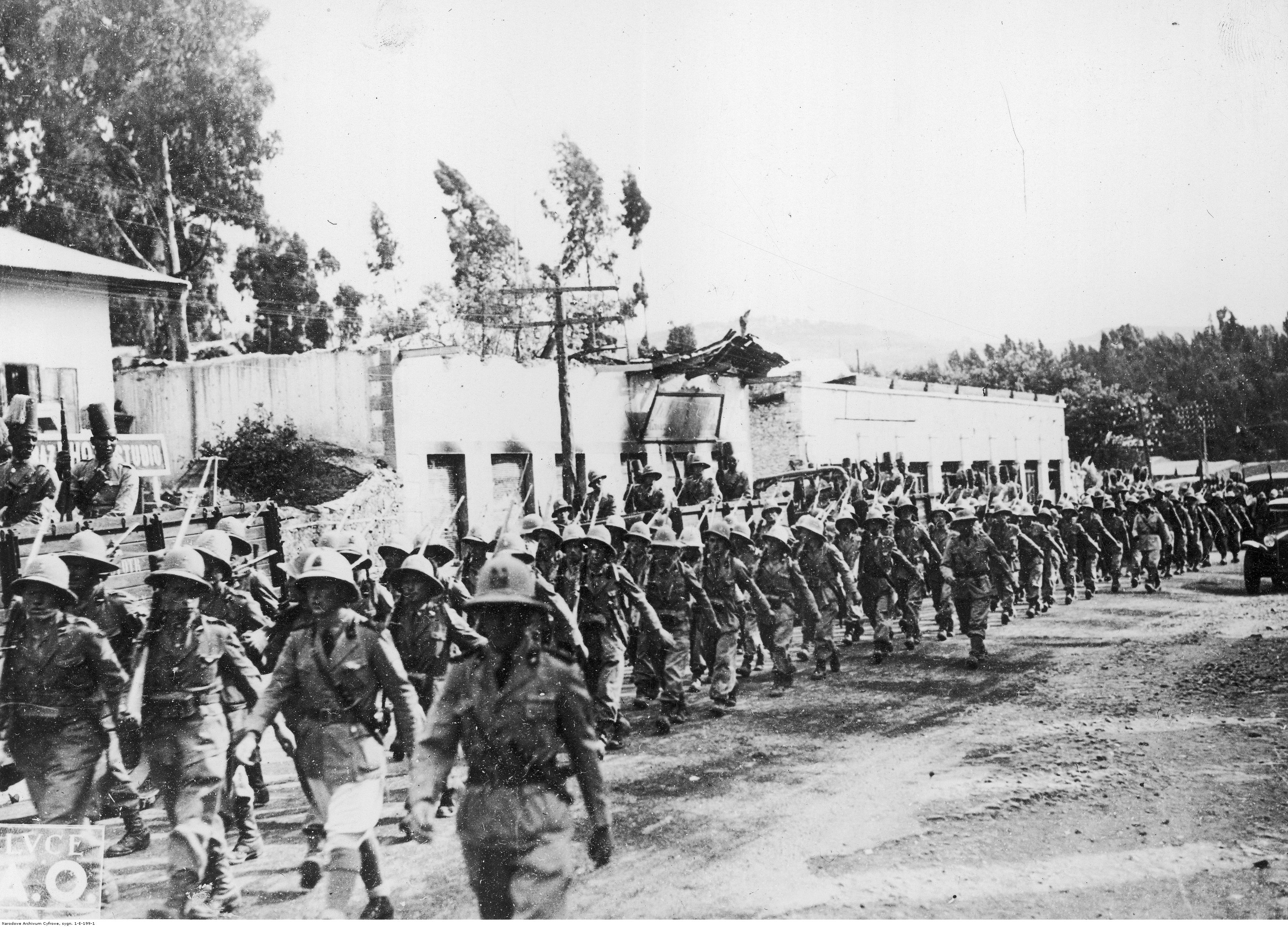
Italian troops in Addis Ababa, 1936

The Second Italo-Ethiopian War was to be Mussolini's way of making up for Italy's embarrassing defeat at the hands of the Ethiopians in the First Italo-Ethiopian War in 1896, and was also a chance to expand the Italian empire by taking one of the last regions of Africa not controlled by other European powers and divert the populace from economic woes. General Emilio de Bono put on record that preparations for the invasion of Ethiopia (Abyssinia) had been going on since 1932 as roads were being built from Italian Somaliland into Ethiopian territory, though Mussolini constantly claimed that he was not a "collector of deserts" and would never think of invading.

Ethiopians protested this build-up to war which eventually led up to a border clash at Walwal. Mussolini called this clash "unprovoked aggression" by Ethiopia and Italian forces invaded on 3 October 1935, led by de Bono. In only three days the Italians had captured Adwa by committing the world's first mass aerial bombardment of civilians. In December Pietro Badoglio replaced de Bono as commander of the invasion because of de Bono's cautious advance. In violation of the Geneva convention, the Italian military committed war crimes by extensively using chemical warfare against the Ethiopian military and, even more so, against Ethiopian civilians as well as attacking Ethiopian, British, and Swedish Red Cross facilities.

On 31 March 1936, a desperate final counter-attack by Emperor Haile Selassie I of Ethiopia, was carried out, though word of the attack had already gotten to the Italians, giving them victory in the Battle of Maychew again through the use of chemical weapons. Only a few days later the Ethiopian capital Addis Ababa was conquered, allowing Italy to annex the country on 7 May, proclaiming Victor Emmanuel III Emperor of Ethiopia. Italy's East African possessions was unified into the colony of Italian East Africa.

==== Intervention in the Spanish Civil War (1936–1939) ====
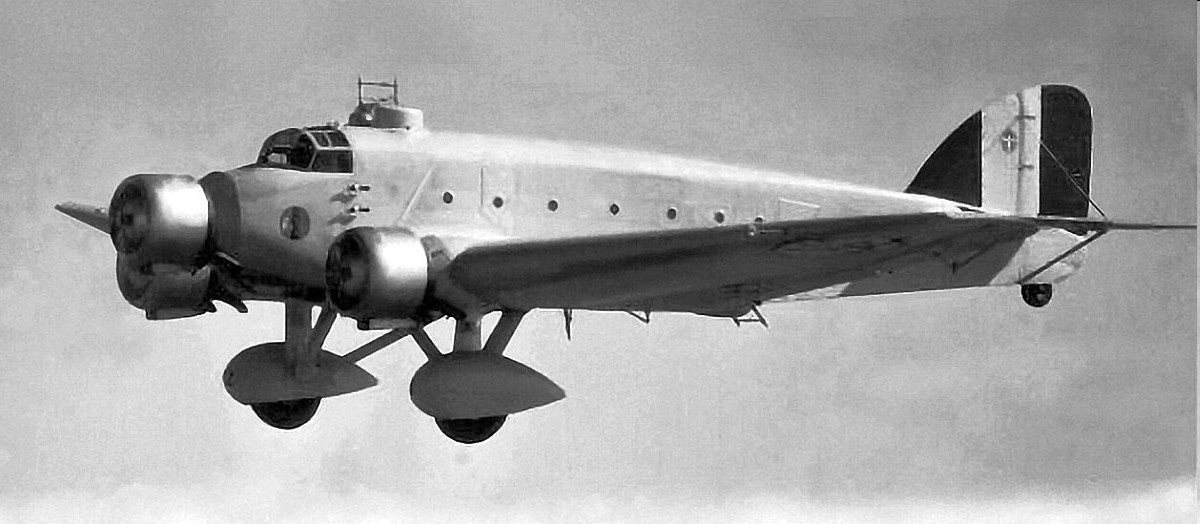
A Savoia-Marchetti SM.81 during a bombing raid in the Spanish Civil War (1936–39).

On 17 July 1936, Francisco Franco and the rest of Nationalist Spain's forces began a rebellion against Republican Spain that was to last three years, called the Spanish Civil War. Franco was fairly sure that he would be able to secure German and Italian help for his National Faction, sending emissaries out on 20 July to achieve this. Both did indeed pledge support, sending in the Corpo Truppe Volontarie from Italy and the Legión Cóndor from Nazi Germany, as well as weapons and aircraft. Mussolini was very devoted, eventually sending in 37,000 men and huge numbers of planes to ensure that this "campaign against communism" would succeed.

The foreign press started to heap pressure on Mussolini when Italian troops suffered a major defeat at Guadalajara, which led to Mussolini sending in normal troops rather than militia to fight in Spain, eventually ruining the Italian economy with the expense of a war Mussolini thought would end any day. This war also distracted Italy, allowing Germany to carry out the annexation of Austria with the Anschluss, a move that otherwise may have been a breaking point between the two powers, due to Austria's alliance with Fascist Italy. The war was supposed to be a staging ground for Italian tactics, potential time to fix any creases out of the system, but Italy continued during World War II to use the same tactics as long before that, unlike Germany's new revolutionary war tactics.

==== Conquest of Albania (1939) ====
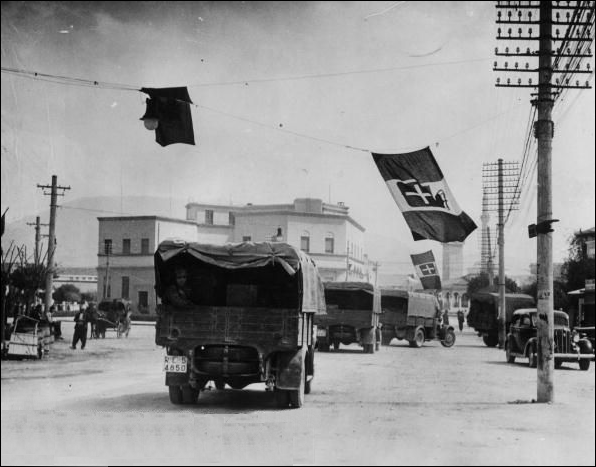
Italian forces in Albania.

As Germany annexed Austria and occupied Czechoslovakia, Mussolini decided to accompany that invasion with his own invasion of Albania. Albania had long been politically dominated by Italy and several of its military officers were actually Italian. Albanian King Zog was in fairly serious debt and wanted help from Italy, so Mussolini sent foreign minister Gian Galeazzo Ciano to him with a list of demands, which Ciano described as impossible to accept. Once King Zog declined, Mussolini said that he must accept the demands by 7 April 1939, or Italy would invade.

The invaders had already disembarked to invade before that time. General Alfredo Guzzoni led two Bersaglieri divisions with a battalion of tanks in the invasion, where resistance was minor, though various organizational problems in the Italian military showed themselves. King Zog fled the country to Greece, was granted asylum in Athens and eventually got to London. On 12 April, the Albanian parliament voted to unite their country with Italy, giving Victor Emmanuel III the Albanian crown.

On 15 April 1939, Albania withdrew from the League of Nations, from which Italy had resigned in 1937. On 3 June 1939, the Albanian foreign ministry merged into the Italian foreign ministry, and Albanian Foreign Minister Xhemil Dino became an Italian ambassador. Upon the capture of Albania, Italian dictator Benito Mussolini declared the official creation of the Italian Empire and King Victor Emmanuel III was crowned King of the Albanians in addition to his title of Emperor of Ethiopia, which had been occupied by Italy three years before. The Albanian military was placed under Italian command and formally merged into the Italian Army in 1940.

==== Pact of Steel ====
On May 22, 1939, the Pact of Steel was signed by Galeazzo Ciano and German foreign minister Joachim von Ribbentrop, effectively allying the two powers. Despite the fairly good relations the two states had had, many Italians were against this alliance, thinking of it as more of a submission to Germany, knowing that Italian interests were likely not to be favored in the relationship. The alliance also technically forced Italy to join in any war that Germany had entered, so that Germany could at any time present the treaty and force Mussolini to enter, though they did not end up using this right.

=== World War II ===
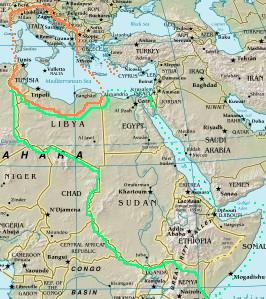
Map of Great Italy according to the 1940 fascist project in case Italy had won the World War II (the orange line delimits metropolitan Italy, the green line the borders of the enlarged Italian Empire)

The Italian Empire (red) before World War II. Pink areas were annexed/occupied for various periods between 1940 and 1943 (the Tientsin concession in China is not shown).

Nazi Germany invaded Poland on 1 September 1939, but Italy remained neutral for the following ten months even though it was one of the Axis powers.

Italian dictator Benito Mussolini's Under-Secretary for War Production, Carlo Favagrossa, had estimated that Italy could not possibly be prepared for such a war until at least October 1942. This had been made clear during Italo-German negotiations for the Pact of Steel whereby it was stipulated that neither signatory was to make war without the other earlier than 1943. Although considered a major power, the Italian industrial sector was relatively weak compared to other European major powers. Italian industry did not equal more than 15% of that of France or of Britain in militarily critical areas such as automobile production: the number of automobiles in Italy before the war ranged at c. 372,000, in comparison to c. 2,500,000 in Britain and France. The lack of a stronger automotive industry made it difficult for Italy to mechanize its military. Italy still had a predominantly agricultural-based economy, with demographics more akin to a developing country (high illiteracy, poverty, rapid population growth and a high proportion of adolescents) and a proportion of GNP derived from industry less than that of Czechoslovakia, Hungary and Sweden, in addition to the other great powers. In terms of strategic materials, in 1940, Italy produced 4.4, 0.01, 1.2 and 2.1 Mt of coal, crude oil, iron ore and steel, respectively. By comparison, Great Britain produced 224.3, 11.9, 17.7, and 13.0 Mt and Germany produced 364.8, 8.0, 29.5 and 21.5 Mt of coal, crude oil, iron ore and steel, respectively. Most of the raw material needs could only be fulfilled through importation and no effort was made to stockpile key materials before the entry into war. Also, approximately one quarter of Italy's merchant fleet were present at foreign ports and given no forewarning of Mussolini's rash decision to enter the war and were immediately impounded. Another handicap was the large number of weapons and supplies given by Italy practically for free to the Spanish forces fighting under Franco during the Spanish Civil War between 1936 and 1939. The Italians also sent the "Corps of Volunteer Troops" (Corpo Truppe Volontarie) to fight for Franco. The financial cost of this war was between 6 and 8.5 billion lire, approximately 14 to 20% of annual expenditure. Added to these issues was Italy's extreme debt position. When Benito Mussolini took office in 1921 the government debt was 93 billion lire, un-repayable in the short to medium term. Yet only two years later this debt increased to 405 billion lire.

The Italian Royal Army (Regio Esercito) therefore remained comparatively depleted and weak at the commencement of the war. The Italian tanks were of poor quality, and radios were few in number. The bulk of the Italian artillery dated from World War I. The Italian Air Force (Regia Aeronautica's) primary fighter was the Fiat CR-42, though an advanced design for a biplane with excellent performance characteristics, it was obsolete compared to the then current generation monoplane fighters of other nations. The Italian Royal Navy (Regia Marina) had no aircraft carriers. In addition, the Royal Air Force (Regia Aeronautica) could field approximately 1,760 aircraft, of which only 900 could be considered as "front-line machines".

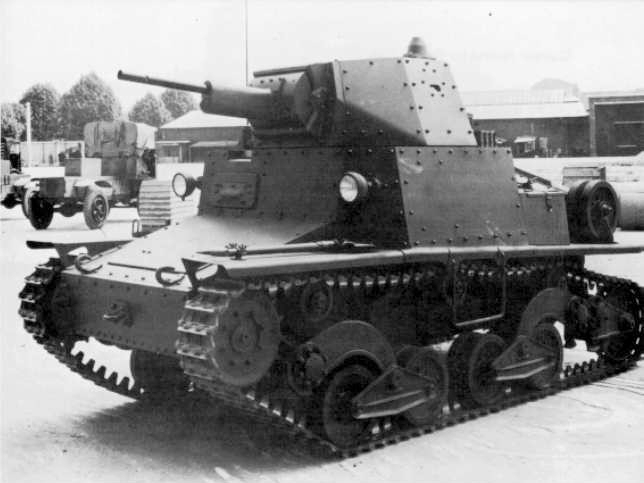
A Fiat-Ansaldo L6/40 tank in 1940

Yet whilst equipment was lacking and outdated, Italian authorities were acutely aware of the need to maintain a modern army (Note: The decision to continue with a frontline biplane fighter, due to the success of the highly maneuverable Fiat CR.32 during the Spanish Civil war was probably one of the most glaring strategic oversights. Another was the mistaken belief that fast bombers need no fighter escort, particularly modern aircraft with radar support.) and were taking the necessary steps to modernize in accordance with their very own relatively advanced tactical principles. (Note: Italian doctrine envisaged a blitzkrieg style approach as early as 1936-8, considerably beyond what most theorists discerned at the time. This stressed massed armour, massed and mobile artillery, action against enemy flanks, deep penetration and exploitation, and the ‘indirect’ approach. Their manuals envisioned M tanks as the core, P tanks as the mobile artillery and reserves for the ‘Ms’ and L tanks. These were to be combined with fast (celere) infantry divisions and forward anti-tank weapons. The Italians were never able to build the armoured divisions described in their manuals – although they often attempted to mass what they had to make up for the poor performance of some pieces.) Almost 40% of the 1939 budget was allocated to military spending. Awareness existed, albeit belatedly, of the need to have close air support for the Navy and the decision to build carriers was taken. (Note: This was being expedited through the conversion of two passenger liners and the scavenging of parts from other vessels. The SS Roma, converted into the Aquila, received 4-shaft turbine engines scavenged form the unfinished light cruisers Cornelio Silla and Paolo Emilio. She was to have a maximum complement of 51 Reggiane Re.2001 fighters. The decision to build carries came late. The Aquila was virtually ready by the time of armistice with the Allies in 1943. She was captured by the Germans, who scuttled her in 1945.) And whilst the majority of equipment was obsolescent and poor, appropriate steps were being taken whereby quality equipment was being developed. For example, the three series 5 fighters (Note: Fiat G.55 Centauro, Macchi C.205, & Reggiane Re.2005; Italian fighters build around the Daimler-Benz DB 605 engine.) were capable of meeting the best allied fighters on equal terms, but only a few hundred of each were produced. The Fiat G55 Centauro received much German interest and was defined by Oberst Petersen, advisor to Goering, as the "best Axis fighter." The Carro Armato P40 tank, roughly equivalent to the M4 Sherman and Panzer IV, was designed in 1940, but no prototype was produced until 1942 and developers/manufacturers not able to roll out any of these tanks before Armistice. (Note: The M13/40s and M14/41s were not (initially) obsolete when they entered service in late 1940/1941. Their operators (in the form of the Ariete and Littoro divisions) met with much unaccredited success. Yet they became obsolescent as the war progressed. It was necessary to maintain production and they suffered unduly as a result of the Italian's inability to produce a suitable successor in time and in numbers.) This was owing, in part, to the lack of sufficiently powerful engines, which were themselves undergoing a development push. Total tank production for the war (≈3,500) was less than the number of tanks used by Germany in its invasion of France. The Italians were also reported to be the first to use self-propelled guns, both in close support and anti-tank roles, and their, for example, 75/46 (& 75/32), 90/53 (a peer of the German 88/55), 102/35 and 47/32 mm, and 20 mm AA guns were not obsolete. Also of note were the AB 41 and the Camionetta AS 42 which were regarded as excellent vehicles of their type. None of these developments precluded the fact that the bulk of the equipment was obsolescent and poor. However, it was this relatively weak economy, lack of suitable raw materials and inability to produce suitable quantities of armaments and supplies which was predominant reason for Italian military failure.

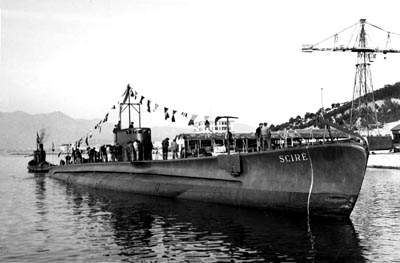
Submarine Scirè used in the victorious Raid on Alexandria (1941).

On paper, Italy had one of the largest armies, but this was far from reality. According to the estimates of Bierman and Smith, the Italian regular army could field only about 200,000 troops at the start of World War II. Irrespective of the attempts to modernize, the majority of Italian army personnel were lightly armed infantry lacking sufficient motor transport. (Note: In light of the economic difficulties it was proposed, in 1933, by Marshal Italo Balbo to limit the number of divisions to 20 and ensure that each was fully mobile for ready response, equipped with the latest weaponry and trained for amphibious warfare. The proposal was rejected by Mussolini (and senior figures) who wanted large numbers of divisions to intimidate opponents. To maintain the number of divisions, each became binary, consisting of only 2 regiments, and therefore equating to a British brigade in size. Even then, they would often be thrown into battle with an under strength complement.) There was insufficient budget to train the men in the services such that in World War II the bulk of the personnel received much of their training at the front, when it was too late to be of use. Air units had not been trained to operate with the naval fleet and the majority of ships had been built for fleet actions, not the convoy protection duties which they were mostly employed for during the war. Regardless, a critical lack of fuel kept naval activities to a minimum.

Senior leadership was also an issue. Mussolini personally assumed control of all three individual military service ministries with the intention of influencing detailed planning. Comando Supremo (the Italian High Command) consisted of only a small complement of staff that could do little more than inform the individual service commands of Mussolini's intentions, after which it was up to the individual service commands to develop these into proper plans and execute. The result was that there was no central direction for operations and the three military services tended to work independently, focusing only on their fields, with little inter-service cooperation.

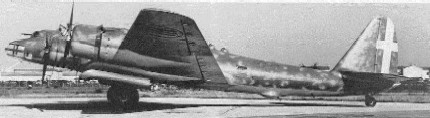
The Italian long-range bomber Piaggio P.108, ready to attack Gibraltar in 1942

Following the German conquest of Poland, Mussolini would change his mind repeatedly as to whether he would enter the war. The British commander in Africa, General Archibald Wavell, correctly predicted that Mussolini's pride would ultimately cause him to enter the war. Wavell would compare Mussolini's situation to that of someone at the top of a diving board: "I think he must do something. If he cannot make a graceful dive, he will at least have to jump in somehow; he can hardly put on his dressing-gown and walk down the stairs again."

Some historians believe that Italian leader Benito Mussolini was induced to enter the war against the Allies by secret negotiations with British Prime Minister Winston Churchill, with whom he had an active mail correspondence between September 1939 and June 1940. The journalist Luciano Garibaldi wrote that "in those letters (which disappeared at Lake Como in 1945) Churchill may have extorted Mussolini to enter the war to mitigate Hitler's demands and dissuade him from continuing hostilities against Great Britain as France was inexorably moving toward defeat. In light of this, Mussolini could urge Hitler turn against the USSR, the common enemy of both Churchill and Mussolini".

Initially, the entry into the war was clearly political opportunism, which led to a lack of consistency in planning, with principal objectives and enemies being changed with little regard for the consequences. Mussolini was well aware of the military and material deficiencies but thought the war would be over soon and did not expect to do much fighting. This led to confusion amongst ordinary Italians and soldiers who had little idea of what they were fighting for and, hence, had little conviction and saw little justification for it. As the war progressed and one disaster followed another, Comando Supremo were forced to take more serious steps in their planning.

==== France ====
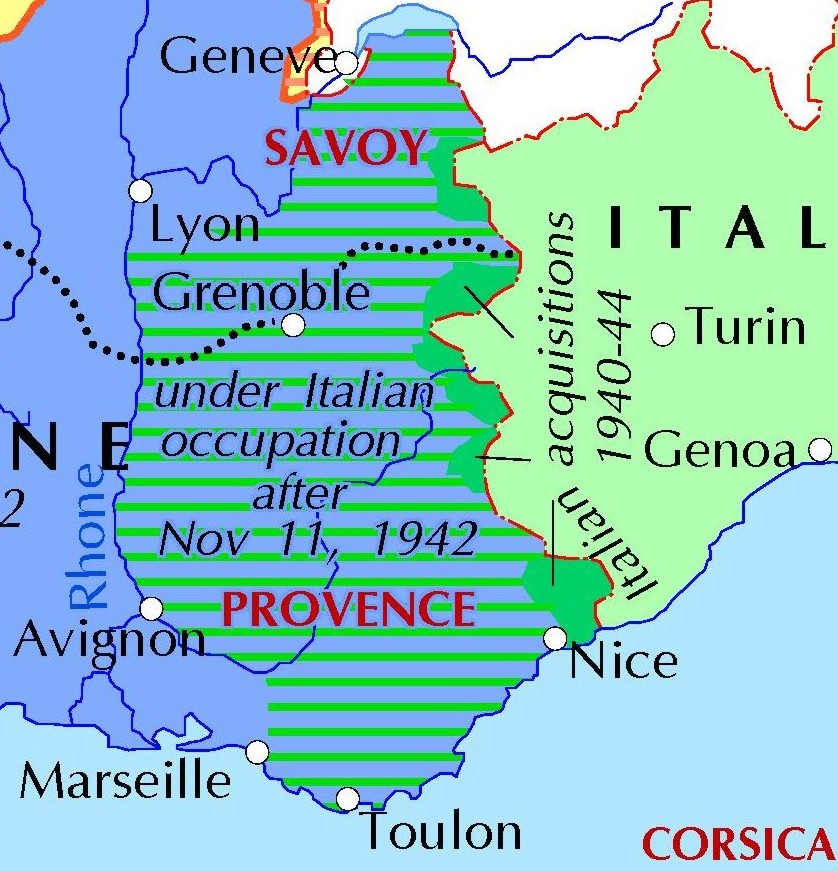
Italian occupation of France (1940–1943) during World War II

As the war looked increasingly bad for the allies, with the impending German conquest of Belgium, the Netherlands, and France, Mussolini could no longer hold himself back and declared war on the allies on 10 June 1940. To Mussolini it seemed that the war was already nearly over, and he wanted to make sure that Italy at least got a position at the peace tables at the end and obtained such lands as Corsica, Nice, and more North African territory. The Italian offensive against France did not actually begin until ten days after the declaration of war, and Italian troops (fighting against a numerically inferior French force, which was however well-entrenched in the Alpine Line) were very slow to capture territory, while Germany had already taken hold of Paris. The Italians made little progress into French territory at the cost of heavy casualties. On 24 June, France agreed to an armistice. The Italian occupation zone consisted of 832 square kilometers.

In addition to Nice and Corsica, Italians projected further territorial claims for the defeated France. In 1940, the Italian Armistice Commission (Commissione Italiana d'Armistizio con la Francia, CIAF) produced two detailed plans concerning the future of the occupied French territories. Plan 'A' presented an Italian military occupation all the way to the river Rhone, in which France would maintain its territorial integrity except for Corsica and Nizza. Plan 'B', proposed by senator Francesco Salata, the director of a section of the ISPI dedicated to Italian territorial claims, encompassed the Italian annexation of the Alpes Maritimes (including the Principality of Monaco) and parts of Alpes-de-Haute-Provence, Hautes Alpes and Savoie. The territory would be administered as the new Italian region of Alpi Occidentali with the town of Briançon (Italian: Brianzone) acting as the provincial capital.

==== Africa ====
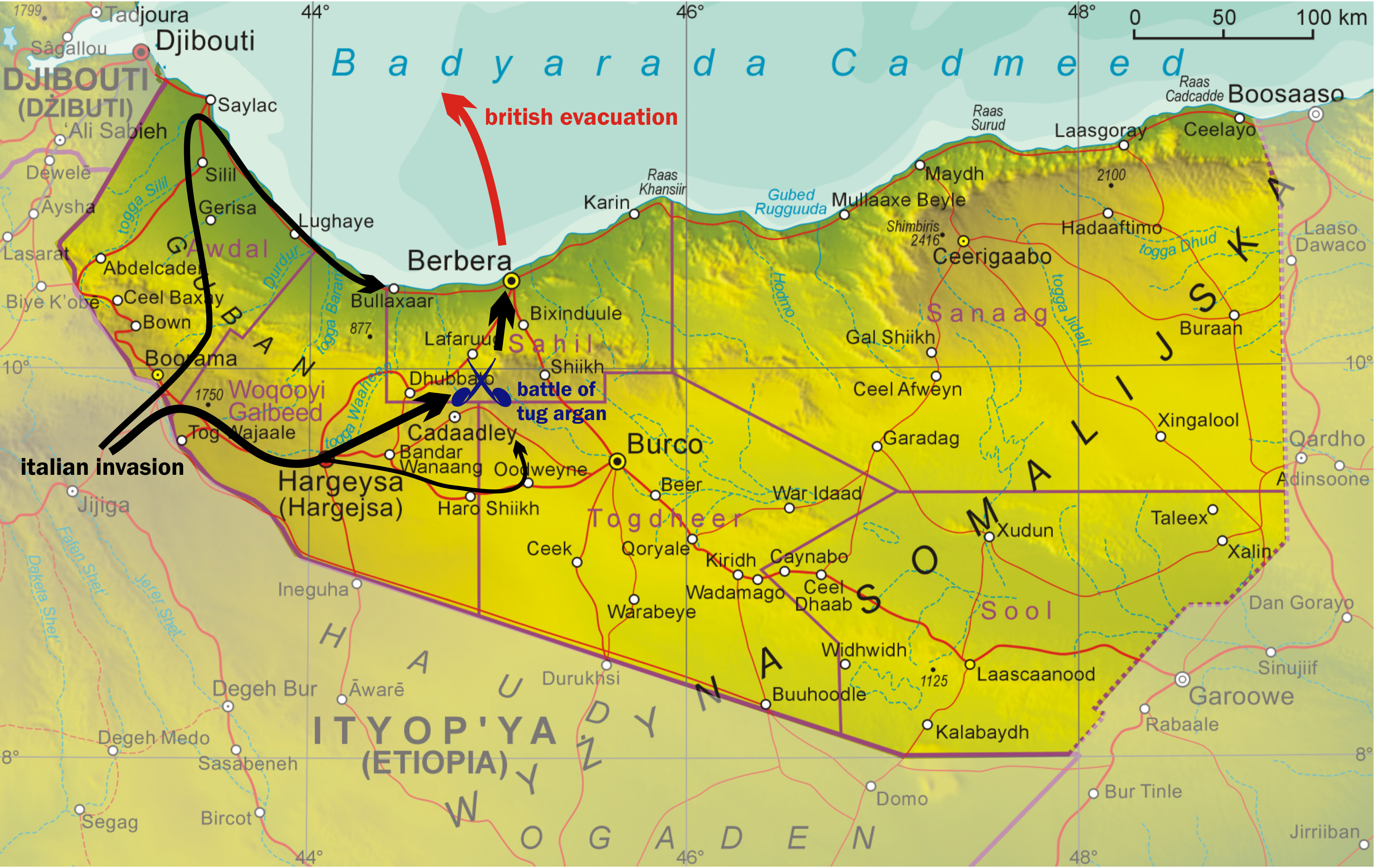
Italian invasion of British Somaliland August 1940

Mussolini's entry into the war was at least bad news for the United Kingdom, as the Regia Marina would now oppose them in Mediterranean waters. Italian armies in Libya and East Africa could also potentially have knocked British troops completely out of Egypt, having half a million men in Africa compared to the United Kingdom's fifty thousand. However, British troops took the initiative in Africa while Italy was still having trouble pacifying Ethiopia and General Wavell kept up a constantly moving front of raids on Italian positions that proved to be successful. On 14 June a successful surprise attack was made on Fort Capuzzo by the British, though it was not meant as a permanent gain as the British were using far more mobile tactics at the time. By mid-September, casualty listings indicate that Italy had lost 3,000 troops where the United Kingdom had only lost slightly over 490, despite Italy's land numbers and air superiority at the time.

On 13 September 1940, Italy began a very slow advance eastward into Egypt. The Italians advanced with six divisions. After three days, they stopped and set up a chain of fortified camps near Sidi Barrani. However, the chain of camps were too far apart from one another. This allowed Wavell make a crippling blow to the Italian forces around Sidi Barrani right at the start of what was to become Operation Compass. Richard O'Connor led the initial attack against the Italian camps. O'Connor moved between the camps and around to the Italian rear. This greatly surprised the Italians and the British were able to immediately capture four thousand prisoners. This attack alone could have effectively annihilated the Italian army in North Africa. But the British commanders did not foresee such a large victory. Instead, the initial attack was thought of as a large-scale raid. For this reason, no infantry division was available to press home the British opportunity at Sidi Barrani. So the remaining Italian troops managed to escape safely to Bardia. However, Bardia was captured by the British within three weeks.

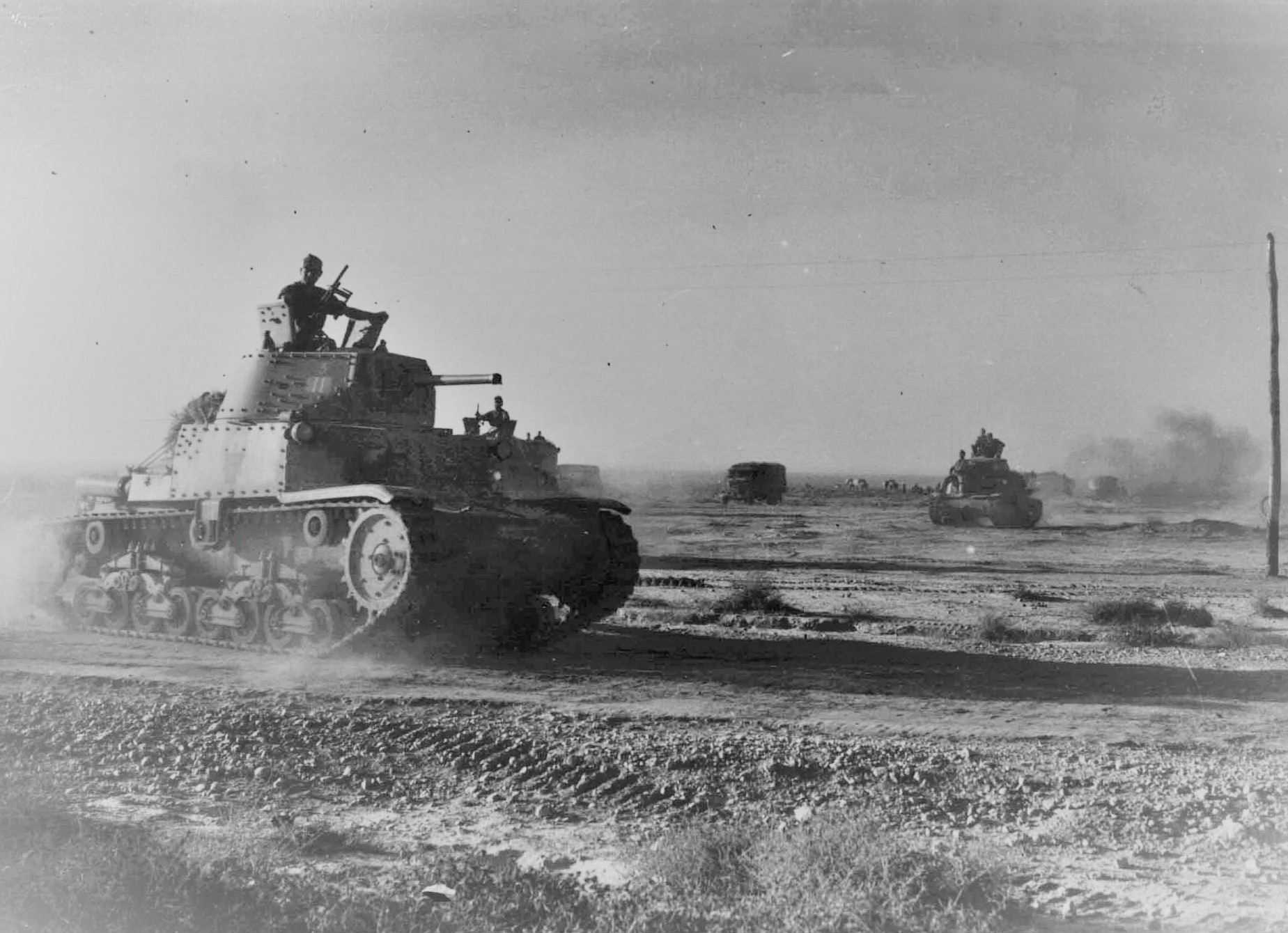
M13/40 tanks of the Ariete Armored Division on the attack during the Battle of Gazala (1942)

The Italian campaign in East Africa was initially more successful, as the Italians captured British Somaliland and small parts of Sudan and Kenya, but lack of fuel and resources then forced them to abandon any further intent of advance and take up a defensive posture against an expected counterattack. This counterattack came from two Indian divisions from Sudan, three divisions from Kenya and an amphibious attack from Aden, in co-operation with Ethiopian Arbegnoch rebels. The Allied forces captured Somalia in February, Eritrea in March–April (after the decisive Battle of Keren), and Addis Ababa, capital of Ethiopia, in April. The Duke of Aosta, viceroy of Italian East Africa, surrendered at Amba Alagi in May. Forces in Italian East Africa were somewhat cut short by the Regia Aeronautica's forced presence in the Battle of Britain at the time, leaving only 150 planes in Ethiopia, as well by the impossibility of receiving supplies from Italy. Some Italian garrisons, such as Gondar and Culqualber, held out till November 1941, and a small number of Italians waged a guerrilla war for some more time, some continuing till 1943.

Campaigning in North Africa was then led by German General Erwin Rommel as field commander of the Panzer Army Africa (A joint Italian-German Army Group), as many Panzer units came into the theatre from Germany as the Afrika Korps. However, the bulk of the Axis army in North Africa was still Italian and Rommel himself was nominally subordinate to Italian Command in North Africa as well to the Italian High Command (Comando Supremo) . The Axis forces was at first very successful, reaching the Egyptian border again in less than a fortnight as they caught General Wavell off-guard. Another British offensive was crushed, and the Axis forces made their way to El Alamein. This made Mussolini believe the end was near, as he flew to Africa, planning to enter the capital of Egypt triumphantly, only to wait three weeks, then fly back to Rome. Field Marshal Montgomery won at El Alamein in October 1942 for the British. This victory coincided with Operation Torch, America's landing in French North Africa, and the Battle of Stalingrad's outcome, destroying Axis morale. After the final loss of Libya in January 1943, Italian and German forces fought the Tunisian Campaign and finally surrendered on 13 May 1943.

==== Greece ====
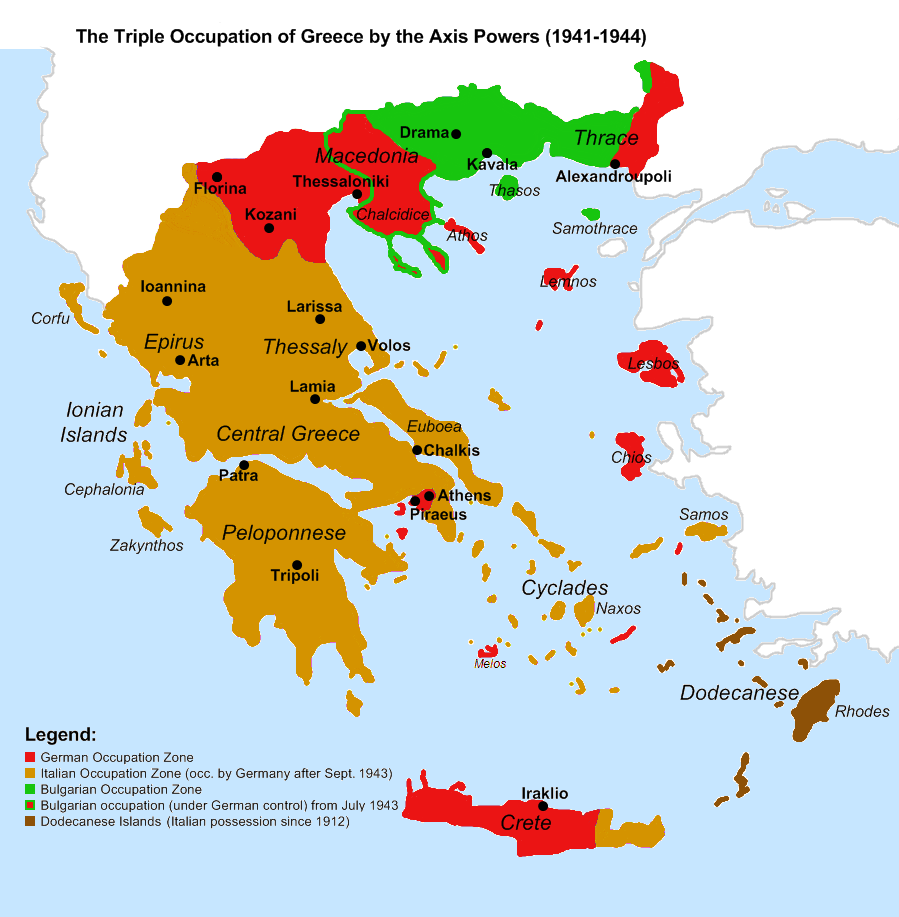
The three occupation zones. Italian German annexed by Bulgaria. The Italian zone was taken over by the Germans in September 1943.

With very little preparation after this disaster in Africa and the ensuing retirement of Rodolfo Graziani, Mussolini then decided on an invasion of Greece as his next move to keep in pace with Germany's recent occupation of Romania. After large propaganda campaigns and even the sinking of a Greek light cruiser, Mussolini then handed an ultimatum to Ioannis Metaxas, Prime Minister of Greece, which would initiate the Greco-Italian War. Hitler was against Mussolini's invasion (as it would require German troops' help later on), but Mussolini continued without German knowledge, as he felt that the Nazis had invaded countries too many times without telling Mussolini beforehand.

Mussolini was very unsure of what date to invade, as he changed his mind many times, even five times in one segment of fifteen minutes. Eventually he decided on 28 October, the anniversary of the March on Rome. In about two weeks, the Italian army was already retreating back into Albania, for conditions at this time of year were very detrimental to mountain warfare and general organization problems continued throughout the military. Hitler then came in to rescue Mussolini's troops, gaining him the upper hand in all politics and military operations for the rest of the war.

==== Yugoslavia ====
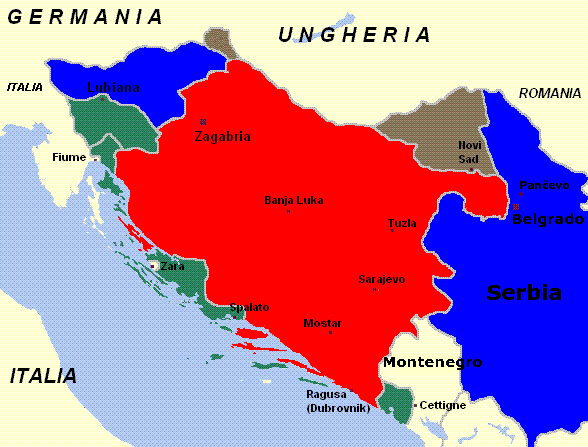
Division of Yugoslavia after its invasion by the Axis powers. Areas annexed by Italy: the area constituting the province of Ljubljana, the area merged with the province of Fiume and the areas making up the Governorate of Dalmatia Independent State of Croatia Area occupied by Nazi Germany Areas occupied by Kingdom of Hungary

On 6 April 1941, the Wehrmacht invasions of both Yugoslavia (Operation 25) and Greece (Operation Marita) began. Together with the rapid advance of German forces, the Italians attacked Yugoslavia in Dalmatia and finally pushed the Greeks out of Albania. On 17 April, Yugoslavia surrendered to the Germans and the Italians. On 30 April, Greece too surrendered to the Germans and Italians, and was divided into German, Italian and Bulgarian sectors. The invasions ended with a complete Axis victory in May when Crete fell. On 3 May, during the triumphal parade in Athens to celebrate the Axis victory, Mussolini started to boast of an Italian Mare Nostrum in the Mediterranean.

Some 28 Italian divisions participated in the Balkan invasions. The coast of Yugoslavia was occupied by the Italian Army, while the rest of the country was divided between the Axis forces (a German and Italian creation, the Independent State of Croatia was born, under the nominal sovereignty of Prince Aimone, Duke of Aosta, but actually governed by the Croatian leader Ante Pavelić). The Italians assumed control of most of Greece with their 11th Army, while the Bulgarians occupied the northern provinces and the Germans the strategically most important areas. Italian troops would occupy parts of Greece and Yugoslavia until the Italian armistice with the Allies in September 1943.

In spring 1941, Italy created a Montenegrin client state and annexed most of the Dalmatian coast as the Governorship of Dalmatia (Governatorato di Dalmazia). A complicated four-way conflict between the puppet Montenegro regime, Montenegrin nationalists, Royalist remnants of the Yugoslav government, and Communist Partisans continued from 1941 to 1945.

In 1942, the Italian military commander in Croatia refused to hand over Jews in his zone to the Nazis.

==== Soviet Union ====
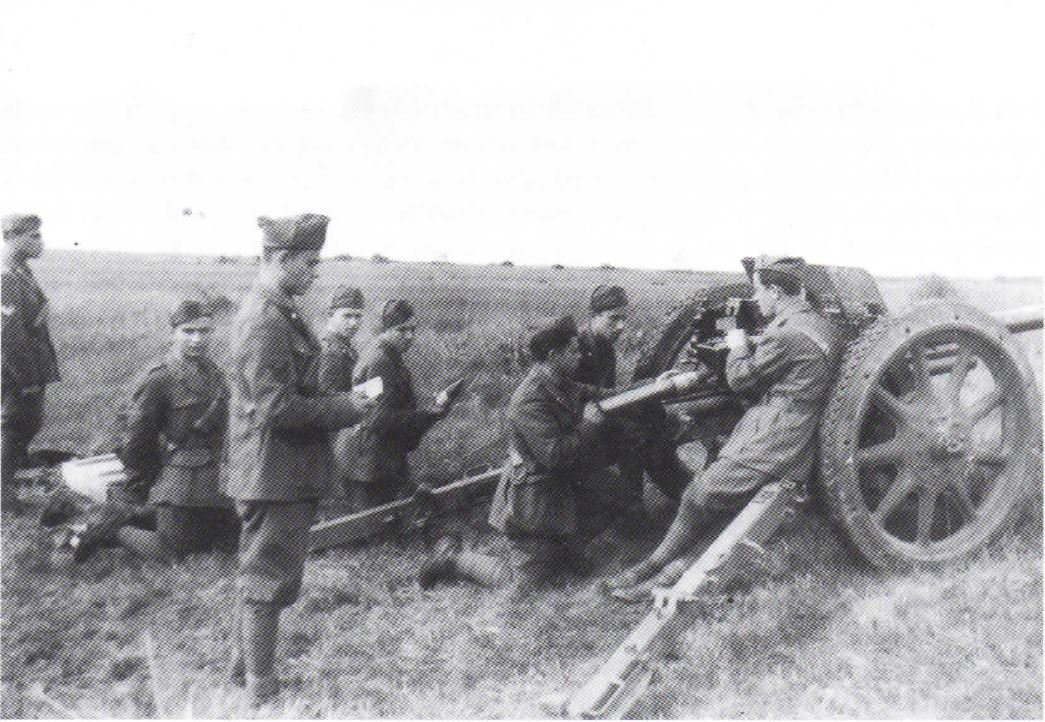
75/32 gun of the Italian army on the Russian front

Mussolini was actually in the middle of negotiating a commercial treaty with the Soviet Union when Hitler invaded his former ally in fighting Poland 22 June 1941. However, Mussolini was taken once again by Hitler's promise of quick victory and would eventually send a total of 200,000 troops to the Eastern front, initially organized as the Italian Expeditionary Corps in Russia. To begin with, three divisions were sent, though only one division was at all motorized, but that division had no tanks.

After some large initial losses in the "Celere" Division, Mussolini sent four new infantry divisions and three Alpini (alpine) divisions to the Soviet Union to officially make his forces an army in July 1942 (Italian Army in Russia). But instead of being deployed in the Caucasus Mountains as expected, the Italian units were tasked with holding the front in the Don river plains. As a result of this disastrous strategic decision, the Alpine troops armed, trained and equipped for mountain warfare and the under strength Italian infantry divisions were pitted against tanks and mechanized infantry, to counter which they were neither equipped nor trained. The Soviet offensive Operation Little Saturn wiped out the majority of the Italian troops, with only the 2nd "Tridentina" Alpine division escaping annihilation. By the end of February 1943, the few remaining Italian troops were being withdrawn, a huge blow to public opinion of the Fascist government in Italy. The remnants of the Italian Army in Russia was still in Italy at the time of the Italian Armistice in September 1943 that led to it being officially disbanded.

The Charge of the Savoia Cavalleria at Izbushensky was a clash between the Italian cavalry Regiment "Savoia Cavalleria" (3rd) and the Soviet 812th Rifle Regiment (304th Rifle Division) that took place on 24 August 1942, near the hamlet (khutor) of Izbushensky (Избушенский), close to the junction between the Don and Khopyor rivers. Though a minor skirmish in the theatre of operation of the Eastern Front, the Izbushensky charge had great propaganda resonance in Italy and it is still remembered as one of the last significant cavalry charges in history.

==== Armistice and liberation of Italy ====
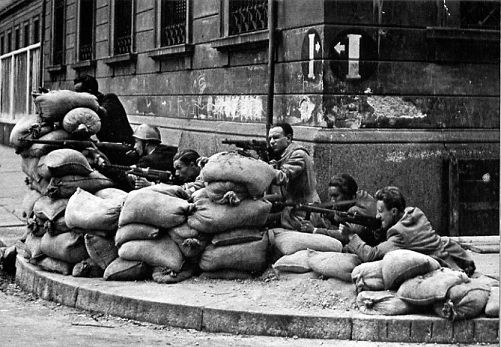
Italian partisans in Milan during the final insurrection leading to the liberation of Italy in April 1945

On 10 July 1943, a combined force of American and British Commonwealth troops invaded Sicily in Operation Husky. German generals again took the lead in the defence and, although they lost the island, they succeeded in ferrying large numbers of German and Italian forces safely off Sicily to the Italian mainland. With the loss of Sicily, popular support for the war diminished in Italy. On 25 July 1943, the Grand Council of Fascism ousted Italian dictator Benito Mussolini and a new Italian government, led by General Pietro Badoglio and King Victor Emmanuel III, took over in Italy. Although the new government declared that Italy would go on fighting with the Axis, it immediately began secret negotiations with the Allies to end the fighting and to come over to the Allied side. On 3 September, a secret armistice was signed with the Allies at Fairfield Camp in Sicily.

The armistice was announced to the public on 8 September. By then, the Allies were on the Italian mainland (landing unopposed because of the armistice). However, German forces soon invaded northern and central Italy, committing several atrocities against Italian civilians and army units who opposed the German occupation and started the Italian resistance movement. The Germans were aware that the Italy might defect from the Axis and strengthened their forces in Italy in preparation during the time of Italy's secret negotiations with the Allies. In the event, the Italian armed forces were given unclear instructions on how to treat their former German allies. Resistance was therefore slight as the Germans moved in and disarmed the Italians and took control of the northern part of Italy. (The exception to this was the navy that received orders to steam out of reach of the Germans. Therefore, few Italian ships fell into German hands.) The captured Italian soldiers were given the choice of imprisonment or to keep fighting for Germany. A minority choose to fight with the Germans. In the Balkans, that Italy had previously occupied alongside Germany, thousands of Italian soldiers evaded capture and joined the local resistance movements. To circumvent the ban on using prisoners of war as forced labor, the Germans re-designated their Italian prisoners as "military internees" and shipped them to Germany as slave labor.

The Italian campaign of World War II, also called the liberation of Italy following the German occupation in September 1943, consisted of Allied and Axis operations in and around Italy, from 1943 to 1945. The Germans freed Mussolini in the Gran Sasso raid (12 September 1943) and set him up as the leader of the Italian Social Republic (RSI) puppet state that kept fighting the Allies until it collapsed when the German forces in Italy surrendered in the spring of 1945. The Allies were of two minds on how to treat the Kingdom of Italy after the armistice. The US wanted to treat the Kingdom of Italy as an equal member of the Allies, while the British wanted to treat the Kingdom like a defeated enemy. The armed forces of the Kingdom of Italy did therefore not enter the war against Germany in full force, although "Co-Belligerent" forces (the Italian Co-Belligerent Army, the Italian Co-Belligerent Air Force and the Italian Co-Belligerent Navy) were eventually set up and fought with the Allies. The post-armistice period also saw the rise of a large Italian resistance movement that fought the Germans and the RSI in the north; an aspect of this period is the Italian civil war.

It is estimated that between September 1943 and April 1945, 60,000–70,000 Allied and 38,805–50,660 German soldiers died in Italy. (Note: In Alexander's Generals Blaxland quotes 59,151 Allied deaths between 3 September 1943 and 2 May 1945 as recorded at AFHQ and gives the breakdown between 20 nationalities: United States 20,442; United Kingdom, 18,737; France, Morocco, Algeria, Tunisia, Senegal and Belgium 5,241; Canada, 4,798; India, Pakistan, Nepal 4,078; Poland 2,028; New Zealand 1,688; Italy (excluding irregulars) 917; South Africa 800; Brazil 275; Greece 115; Jewish volunteers from the British Mandate in Palestine 32. In addition 35 soldiers were killed by enemy action while serving with pioneer units from Botswana, Lesotho, Swaziland, Seychelles, Mauritius, Sri Lanka, Lebanon, Cyprus and the West Indies) The number of Allied casualties was about 330,000 and the German figure (excluding those involved in the final surrender) was over 330,000. (Note: Field Marshal Sir Harold Alexander after the war used a figure of 312,000 but later historians generally arrive at a slightly higher figure.) Fascist Italy, prior to its collapse, suffered about 200,000 casualties, mostly prisoners-of-war taken in the invasion of Sicily, including more than 40,000 killed or missing. Over 150,000 Italian civilians died, as did 35,828 anti-Nazi and anti-fascist partisans and some 35,000 troops of the Italian Social Republic. (Note: In 2010, the Ufficio dell'Albo d'Oro recorded 13,021 RSI soldiers killed; however, the Ufficio dell'Albo d'Oro excludes from its lists of the fallen the individuals who committed war crimes. In the context of the RSI, where numerous war crimes were committed during the Nazi security warfare, and many individuals were therefore involved in such crimes (especially GNR and Black Brigades personnel), this influences negatively the casualty count, under a statistical point of view. The "RSI Historical Foundation" (Fondazione RSI Istituto Storico) has drafted a list that lists the names of some 35,000 RSI military personnel killed in action or executed during and immediately after World War II (including the "revenge killings" that occurred at the end of the hostilities and in their immediate aftermath), including some 13,500 members of the Guardia Nazionale Repubblicana and Milizia Difesa Territoriale, 6,200 members of the Black Brigades, 2,800 Aeronautica Nazionale Repubblicana personnel, 1,000 Marina Nazionale Repubblicana personnel, 1,900 X MAS personnel, 800 soldiers of the "Monterosa" Division, 470 soldiers of the "Italia" Division, 1,500 soldiers of the "San Marco" Division, 300 soldiers of the "Littorio" Division, 350 soldiers of the "Tagliamento" Alpini Regiment, 730 soldiers of the 3rd and 8th Bersaglieri regiments, 4,000 troops of miscellaneous units of the Esercito Nazionale Repubblicano (excluding the above-mentioned Divisions and Alpini and Bersaglieri Regiments), 300 members of the Legione Autonoma Mobile "Ettore Muti", 200 members of the Raggruppamento Anti Partigiani, 550 members of the Italian SS, and 170 members of the Cacciatori degli Appennini Regiment.) On the Western Front of World War II, Italy was the most costly campaign in terms of casualties suffered by infantry forces of both sides, during bitter small-scale fighting around strongpoints at the Winter Line, the Anzio beachhead and the Gothic Line. Casualties among infantry in Italy were proportionally higher than they were on the Western Front of WWI.

=== Post WW2 ===
The peace of Paris formalized to the loss of the entire Italian Colonial Empire (including colonies that had not been conquered by the Fascist government) among other areas next to the Adriatic Sea as stipulated in the Treaty of Paris (1947), resulting in the Istrian-Dalmatian exodus, which involved the emigration of around 350,000 Istrian Italians and Dalmatian Italians. After World War II, Italian irredentism disappeared along with the defeated Fascists and the Monarchy of the House of Savoy. After the Treaty of Paris (1947) and the Treaty of Osimo (1975), all territorial claims were abandoned by the Italian Republic (see Foreign relations of Italy). The Italian irredentist movement thus vanished from Italian politics.

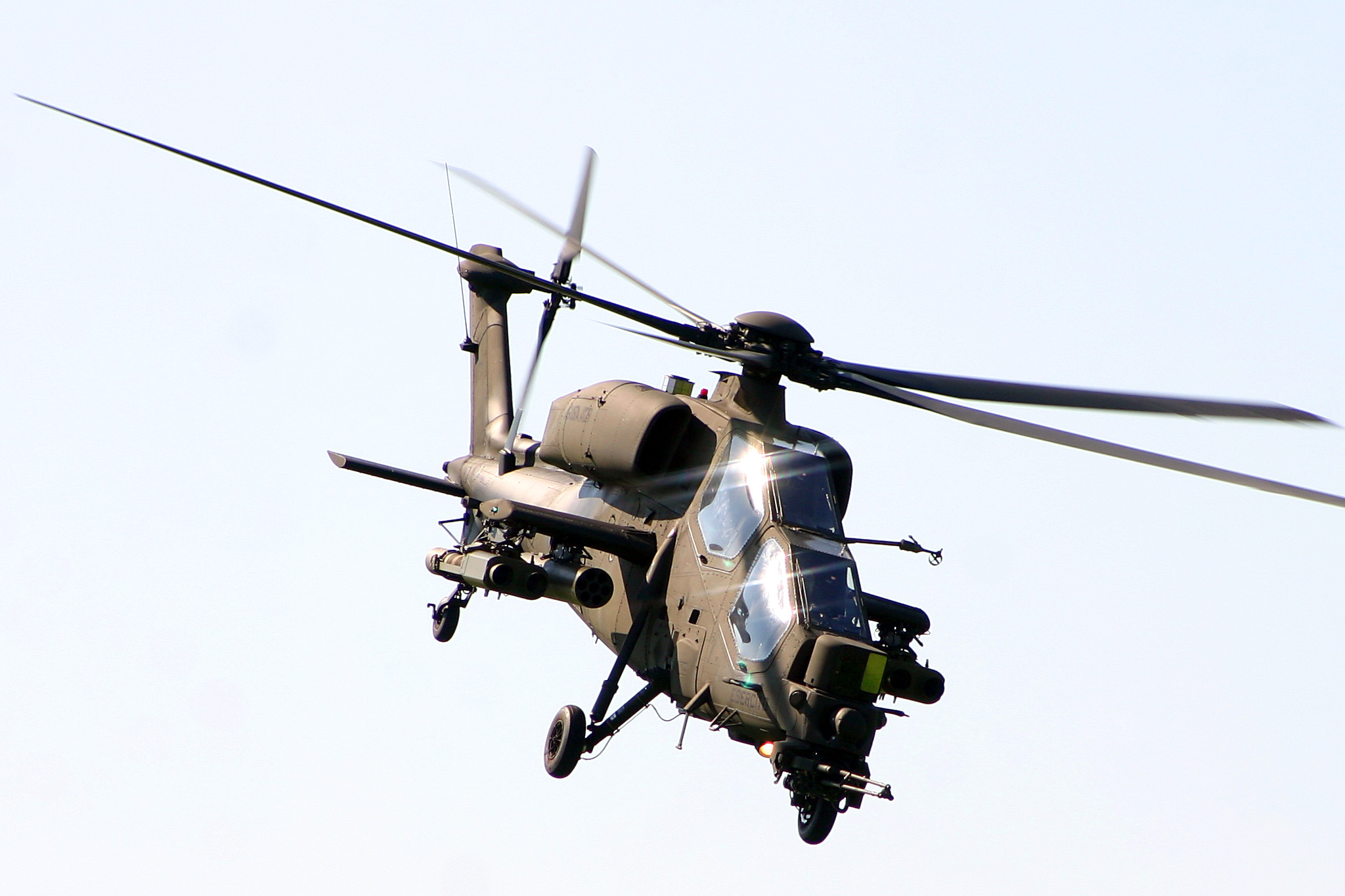
Attack helicopter Agusta A129 Mangusta.

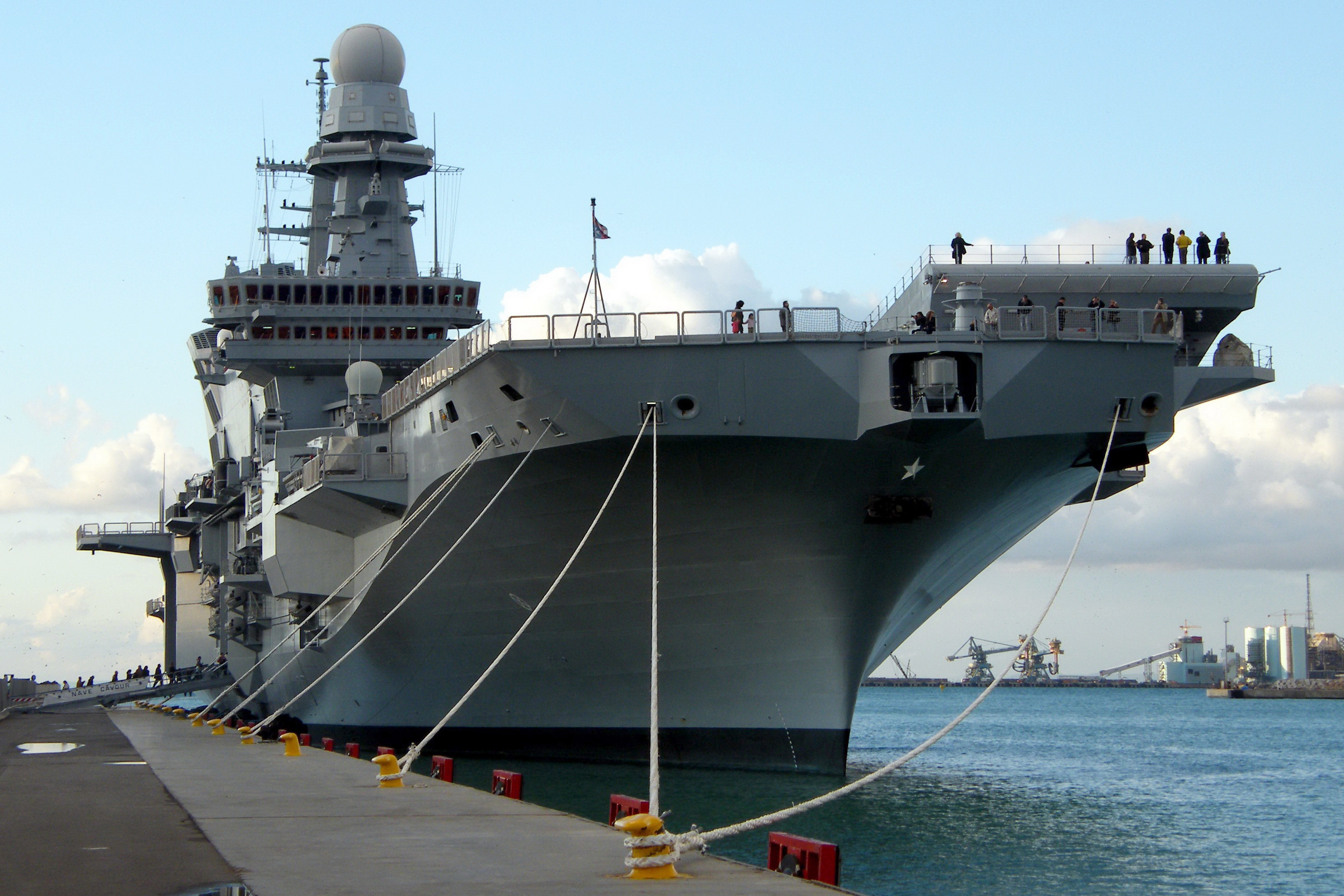
Aircraft carrier MM Cavour, the flagship of the Italian Navy

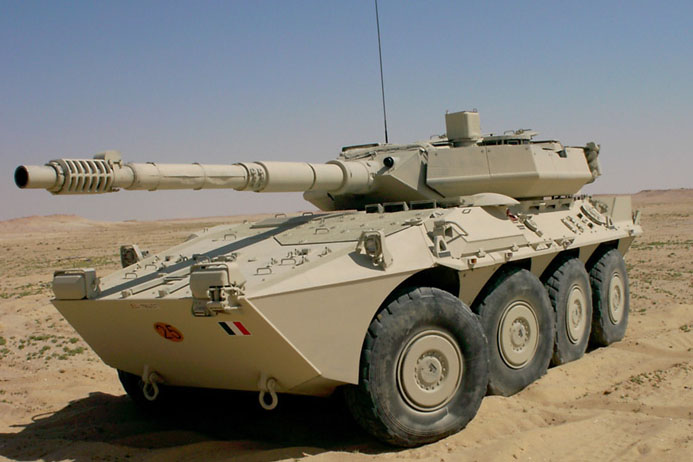
B1 Centauro

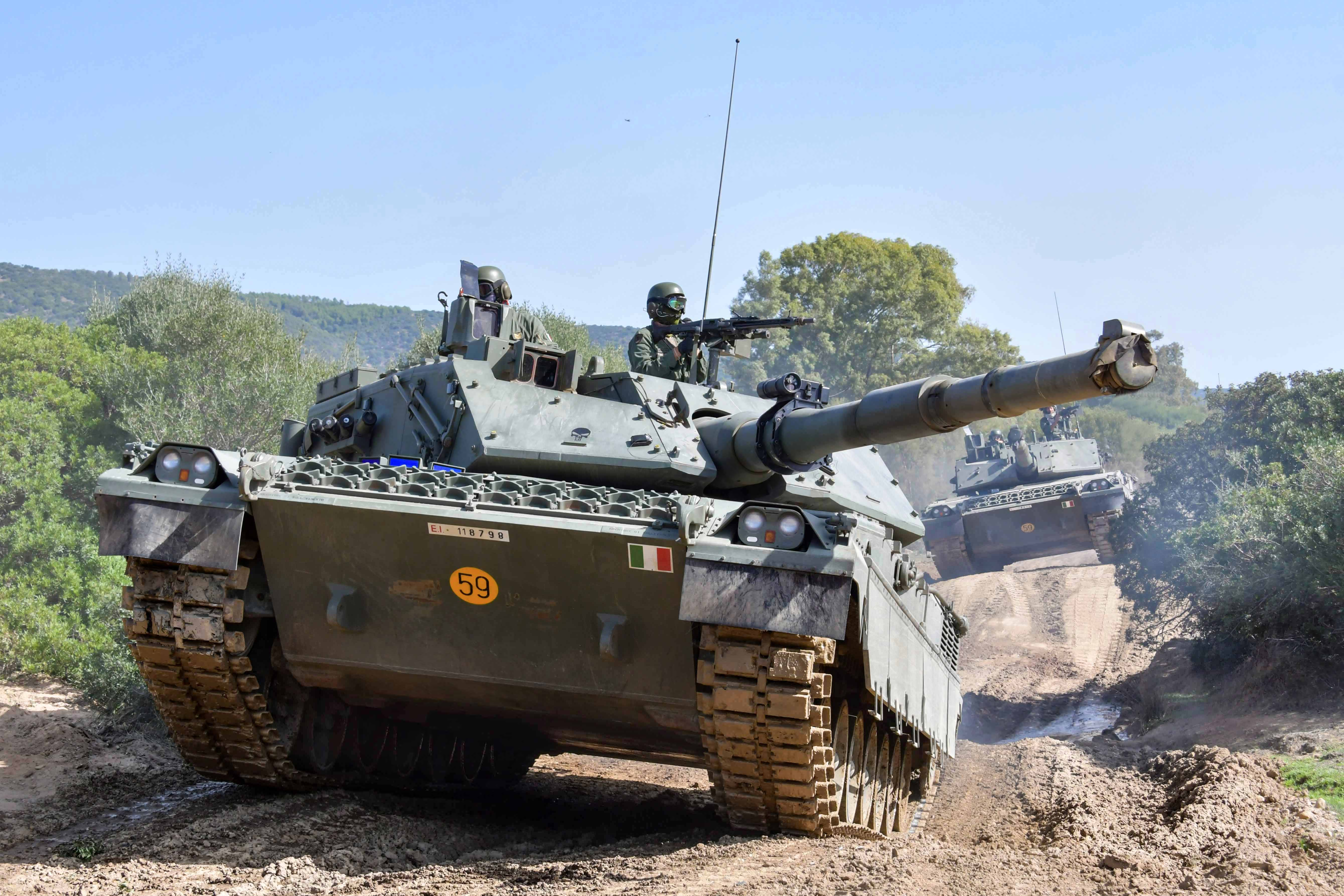
Battle tanks Ariete

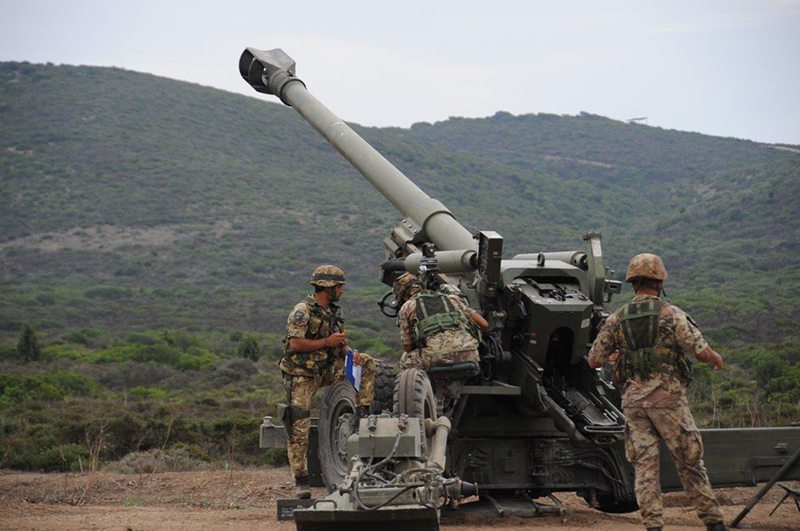
FH70 howitzer

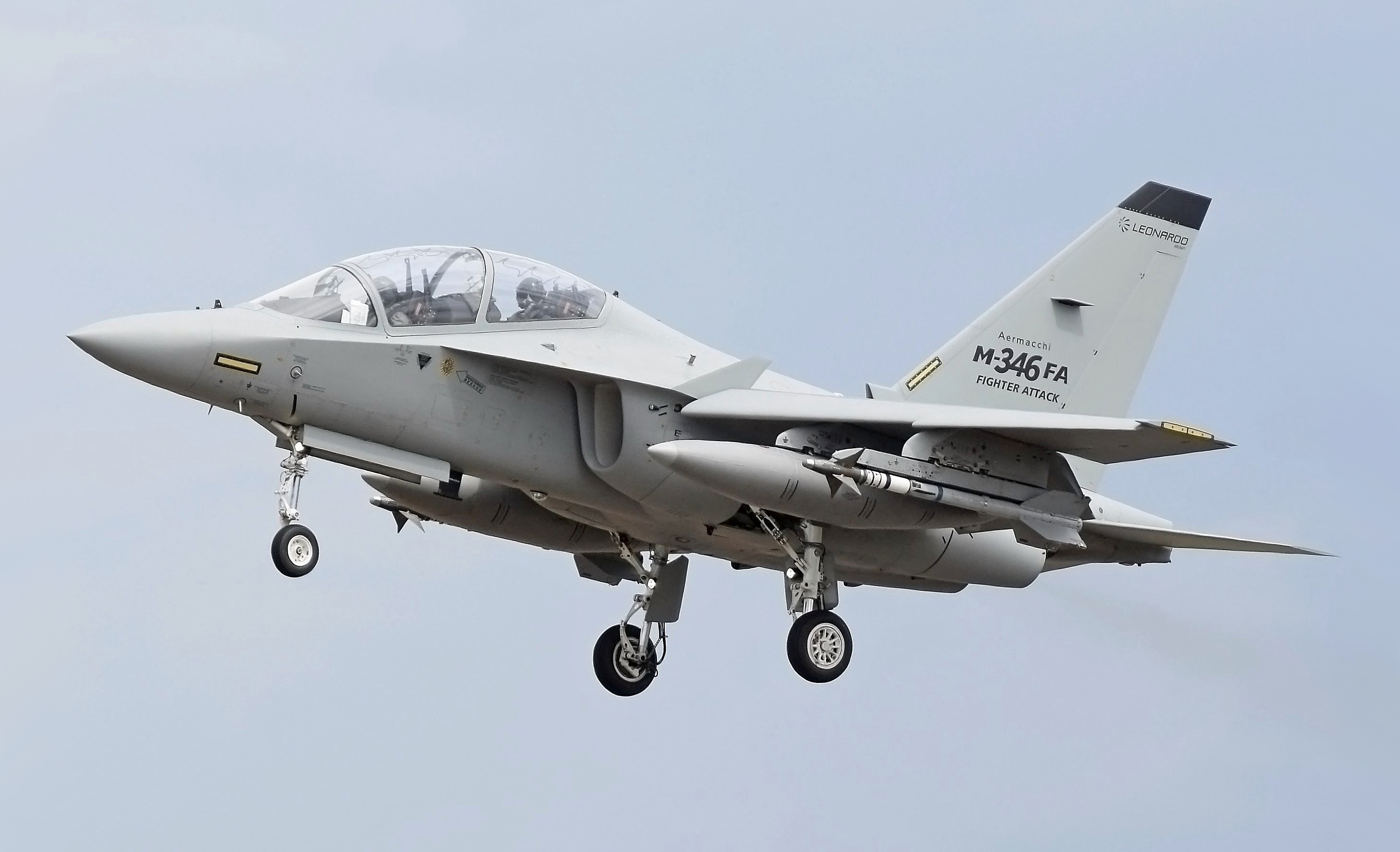
An Alenia Aermacchi M-346 Master

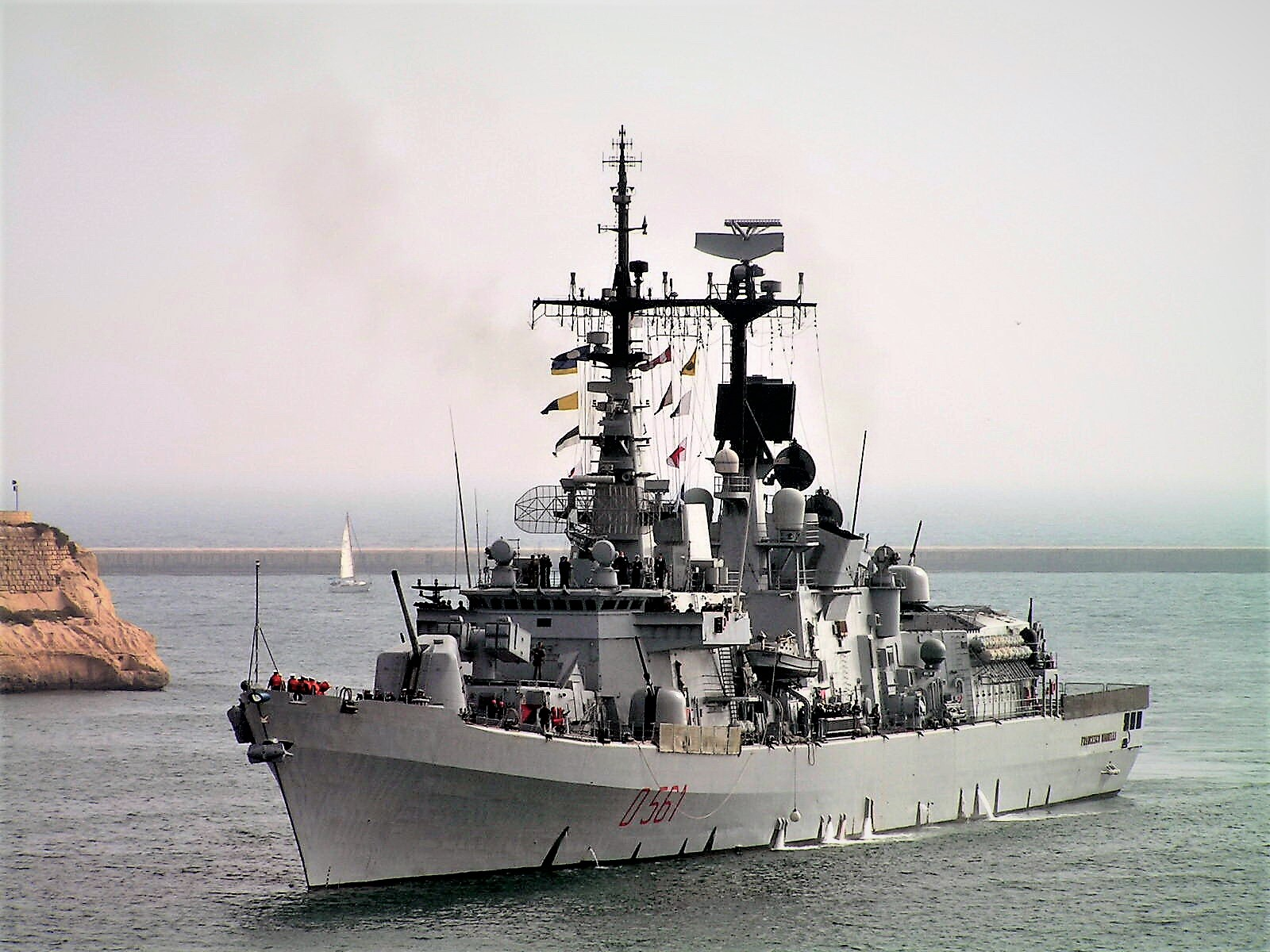
Air-defence destroyer Francesco Mimbelli

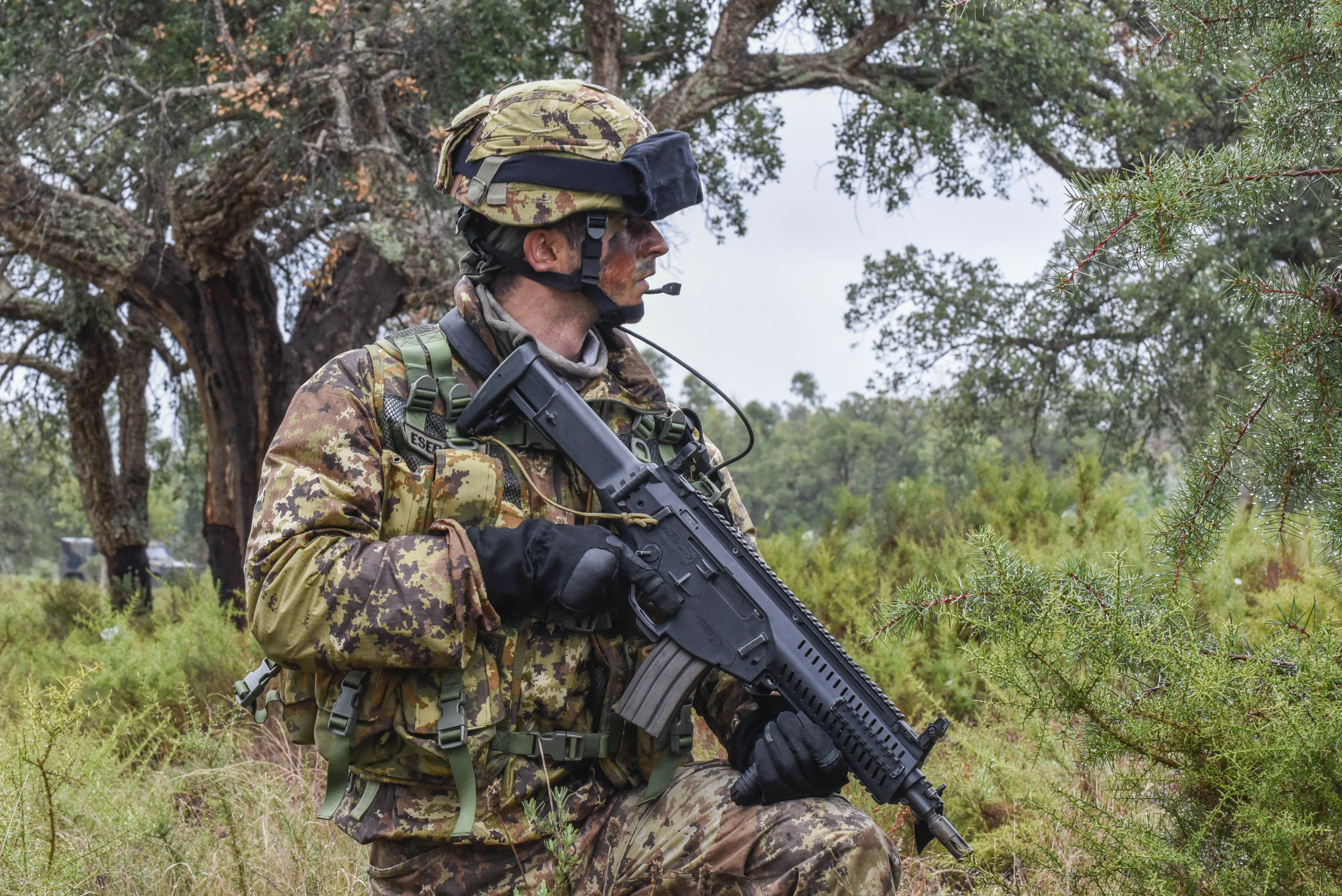
Lagunari reconnaissance member in a security patrol

Post-war Italy adopted a Republican Constitution written by a Constituent Assembly formed by the representatives of all the anti-fascist forces that contributed to the defeat of Nazi and Fascist forces during the liberation of Italy, and became one of the founding members of the Western Bloc military alliance NATO (North Atlantic Treaty Organization) that was formed 4 April 1949. Italy, as defined by Article 11 of the Republican Constitution, repudiate war of aggression and promote and encourage international organisations aimed to achieve peace and justice among nations, even agreeing to limit sovereignty, on condition of equality with other countries, if necessary to achieve these goals.

==== Multinational Force in Lebanon (1982–1984) ====
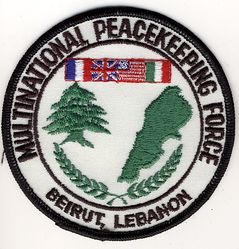
Multinational Force in Lebanon badge

In 1982 Italian forces were deployed to Lebanon (then racked by the Lebanese Civil War) together with American and French troops as the Multinational Force in Lebanon. The stated aim of the Multinational Force was to oversee the withdrawal of the PLO from Lebanon but the deployment lasted beyond that point.

The Italian contingent of around 3,000 troops was led by then Brigadier General Angioni, that in the end was the most successful of the three deployed forces, raising the confidence of Italian leadership and people in the Armed Forces, recovering the low esteem in the public opinion caused by the defeat in World War II and paving the way to the subsequent increase in overseas missions for the Italian military.

The Multinational Force was withdrawn following the deadly 1983 Beirut barracks bombing that simultaneously struck the French and American forces. The Italian contingent was not targeted in this attack. The Italian force was withdrawn on 20 February 1984 (the US followed on 26 February and the last French troops left on 31 March). Two Italian military personnel died while serving in the Multinational Force in Lebanon.

==== Gulf War (1990–1991) ====
Italy contributed 4 warships (plus one support ship) and Panavia Tornado IDS Interdictor/Strike aircraft to the Coalition of the Gulf War.

==== NATO intervention in the Bosnian War (1992–1995) ====
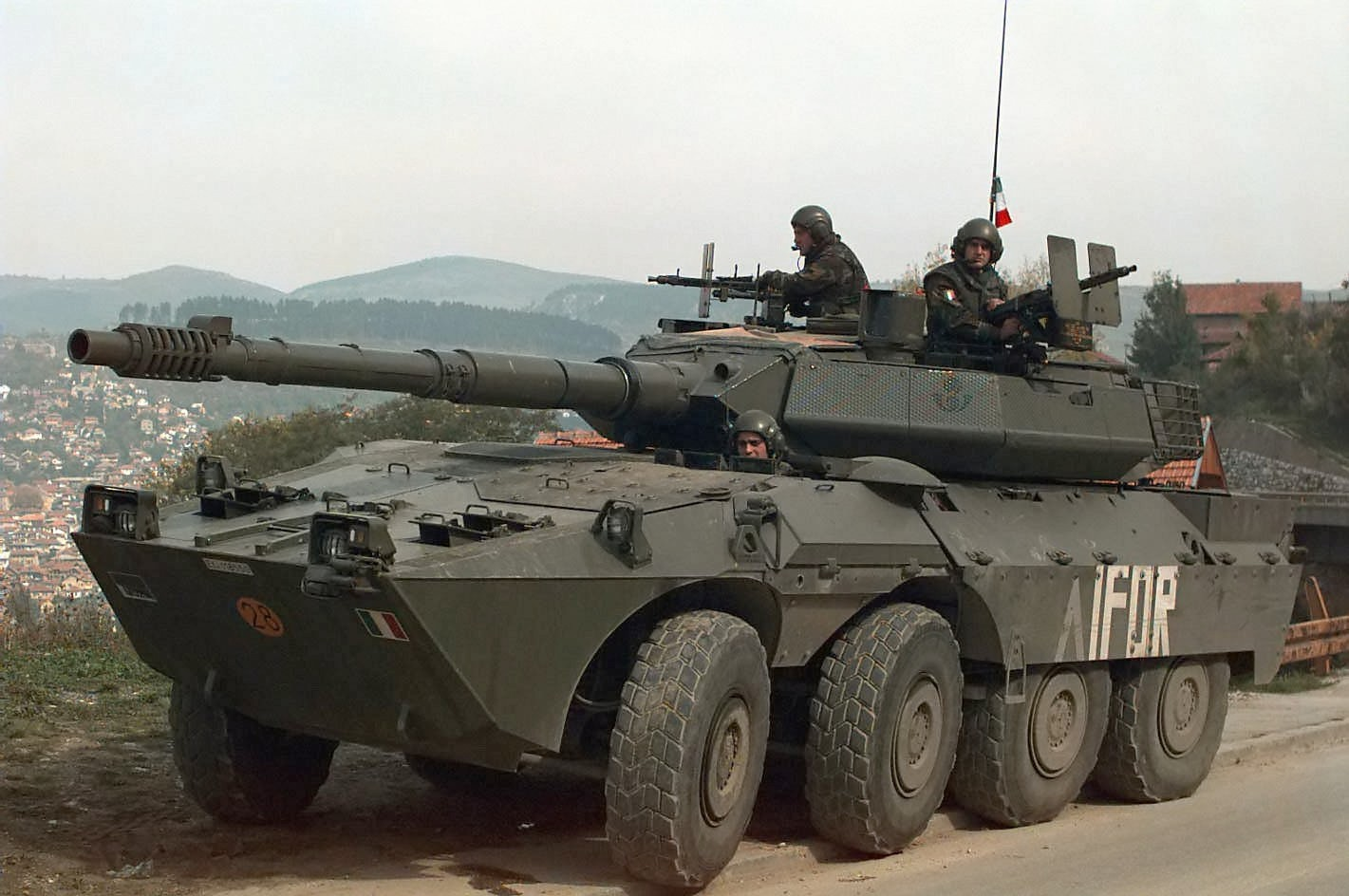
A tank destroyer B1 Centauro during a patrol in Bosnia-Herzegovina as part of IFOR

Under the auspices of NATO, Italy participated in interventions in the Bosnian War (1992–1995). Italy took active part in Operation Deny Flight enforcing a no-fly zone over the war zone. Italian warships also took part in Operation Sharp Guard, a naval blockade enforcing an arms embargo and economic sanctions on the area of the former Yugoslavia. Italy was also part of the 1995 NATO bombing campaign in Bosnia and Herzegovina against Bosnian Serb targets.

==== Unified Task Force and United Nations Operation in Somalia II (1992–1995) ====
Italian forces were part of the Unified Task Force and its successor United Nations Operation in Somalia II a United Nations peacekeeping force whose intervention in the Somali Civil War ultimately proved unsuccessful, ending in withdrawal in 1995.

==== Operation Alba (1997) ====
Operation Alba was an Italian-led multinational peacekeeping force sent to Albania in 1997. Its stated intention was to help the Albanian government restore law and order in the troubled country after the 1997 rebellion in Albania.

The Italian 3rd Army Corps assumed responsibility for the 'Alba' Mission, the first multinational Italian-led mission. Fifteen contributing nations brought humanitarian aid to crisis-struck Albania.

==== Kosovo War (1999) ====
Italy took part in the NATO bombing of Yugoslavia during the Kosovo War (1998–1999). The Italian Air Force operated with 34 Tornados, 12 Lockheed F-104 Starfighters, 12 AMXs, two Boeing 707s and the Italian Navy operated with Harrier II. The Italian Navy also contributed a naval task force that included the aircraft carrier Giuseppe Garibaldi, a frigate (Maestrale) and a submarine (Sauro class), that operated with other NATO ships in the Adriatic sea.

Italian troops are part of the Kosovo Force, a NATO-led peacekeeping force that deployed to Kosovo after the end of the war in 1999.

=== Fourth Army Force (2000) ===
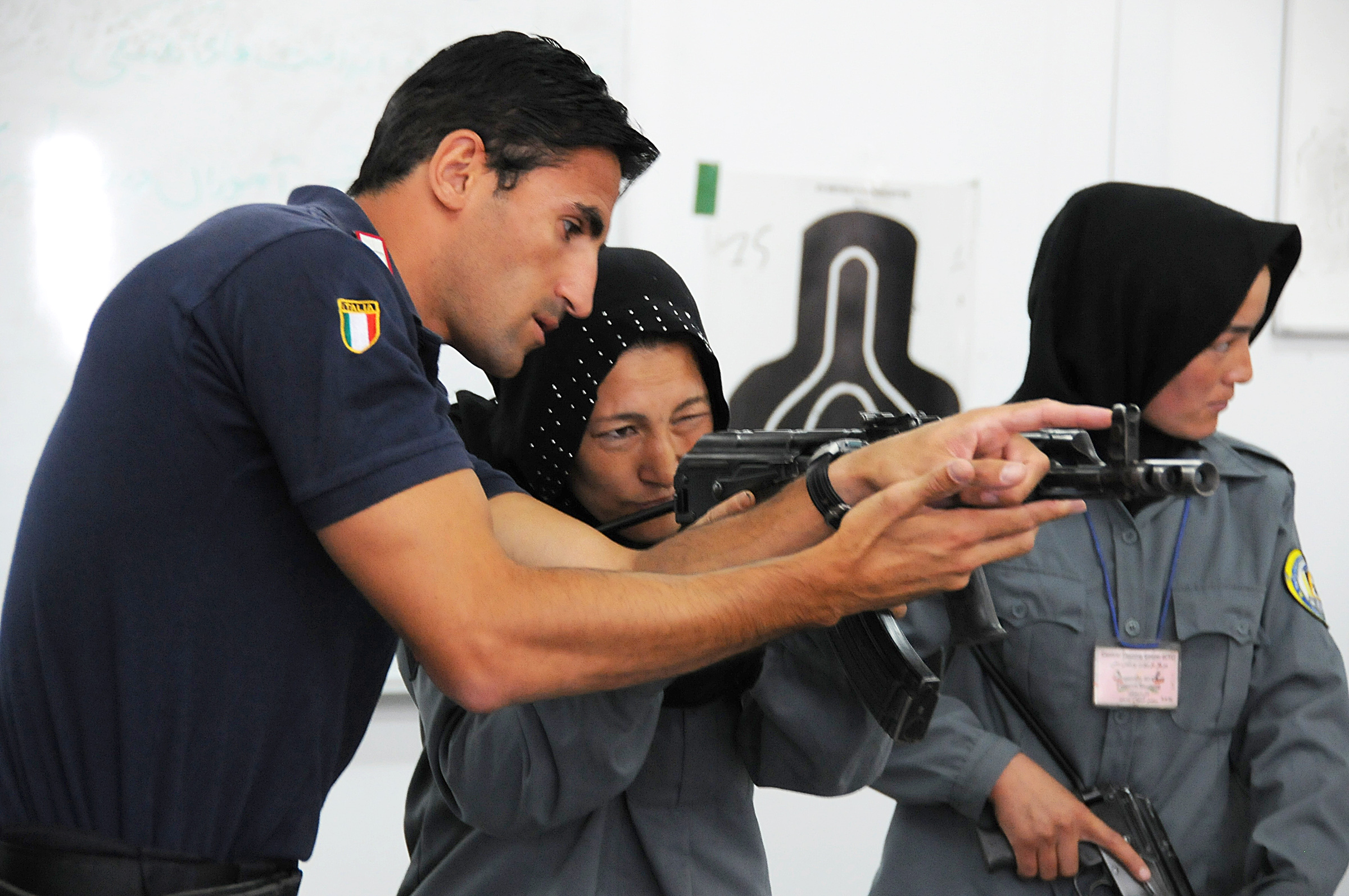
A carabiniere shows a female Afghan National Police recruit how to aim an AMD-65 at the Kabul Central Training Center in 2010 during the Operation Enduring Freedom in Afghanistan

Following the law of 31 March 2000, n. 78, and with the issuing of the legislative decree of 5 October 2000, n. 297 the Carabinieri, from being the first force of the Italian Army, were elevated to an "autonomous position within the Ministry of Defence, with the rank of armed force, and military police force with general competence". This allows participation in Italian military missions abroad, with functions no longer exclusively of military police (art.5). Despite the new rank, according to the principles established by law 18 February 1997, n. 25 on military leaders, still in force, a general officer of the Carabinieri is not allowed to hold the position of Chief of the Defence Staff which can only be assumed by a general officer of the Army, Navy or Air Force.

The Carabinieri, for the defense of the common ideals of freedom in the world, has seen 28 of its men die outside of national borders since 1950. The greatest death toll occurred on 12 November 2003 following the Nasiriyya bombing where 12 carabinieri died and 120 of their colleagues were injured, as well as five army soldiers and two civilian deaths. Following this disastrous event, Italian parliament established the Day of Remembrance of the Military and Civilian Fallen in International Peace Missions on 12 November 2009 with an anniversary on 12 November.

== 21st century ==
=== War in Afghanistan (2001–2021) ===
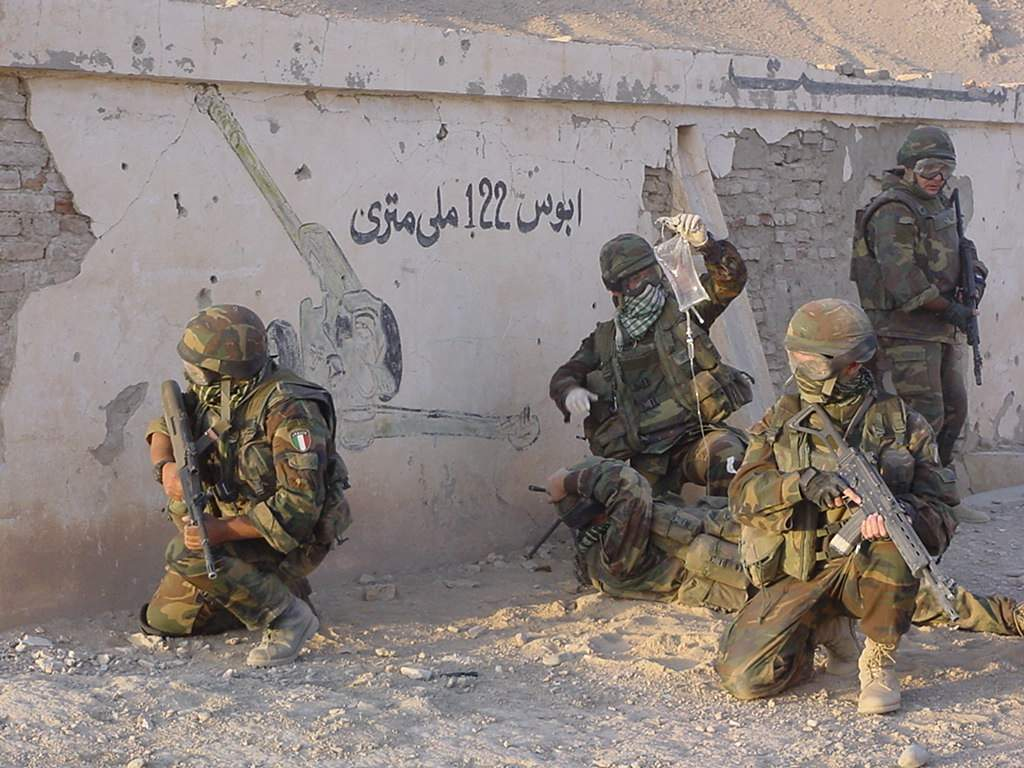
Alpini from the 4th Alpini Regiment in Afghanistan

As part of Operation Enduring Freedom, launched by the United States in response to the September 11 attacks, Italy contributed to the international operation in Afghanistan. Italian forces are part of the ISAF, the NATO-led force in Afghanistan, and has had a Provincial reconstruction team in the country.

Italy initially sent 411 troops, based on one infantry company from the 2nd Alpini Regiment tasked to protect the ISAF HQ, one engineer company, one NBC platoon, one logistic unit, as well as liaison and staff elements integrated into the operation chain of command. Italian forces also command a multinational engineer task force and have deployed a platoon of Italian military police. Three AB 212 helicopters were also deployed to Kabul and four Panavia Tornado aircraft.

47 Italian military personnel have died while serving with ISAF.

=== Multi-National Force – Iraq (2003–2006) ===
The Multi-National Force – Iraq consisted of the nations whose governments had military personnel stationed in Iraq. The Italian Army did not take part in initial combat operations of the 2003 Iraq War, dispatching troops after May 1, 2003 – when major combat operations were declared over by the U.S. President George W. Bush. Subsequently, Italian troops arrived in the late summer of 2003, and began patrolling Nasiriyah and the surrounding area. On 26 May 2006, Italian foreign minister Massimo D'Alema announced that the Italian forces would be reduced to 1,600 by June. The last Italian troops were withdrawn from Iraq in September 2006.

33 Italian military personnel died while serving in Iraq. The greatest single loss of life was on November 12, 2003 when a suicide car bombing struck the Italian Carabinieri Corps HQ in Nasiriyah and killed a dozen Carabinieri, five Army soldiers, two Italian civilians, and eight Iraqi civilians.

=== Multi-National Force – Lebanon (2006–present) ===
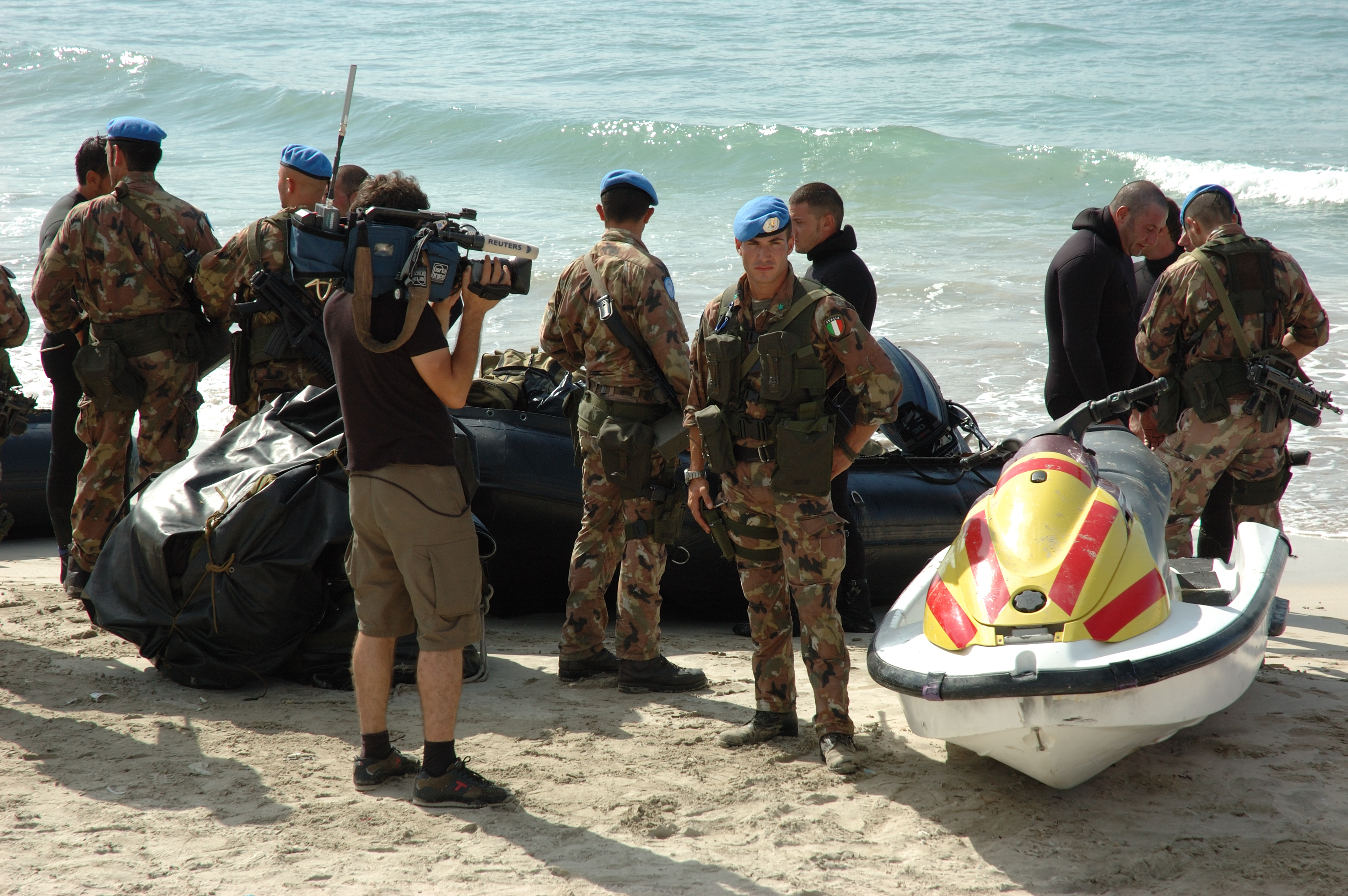
Italian UN soldiers in Lebanon

Operation Leonte – Under the UN mission UNIFIL, Italy sent naval units and 3,000 troops to control the southern Lebanon border.

=== 2011 military intervention in Libya ===
Italy was part of the initial coalition (later expanded to nineteen states) of states that intervened in the Libyan Civil War.

=== Deployments to Niger ===
In December 2017, Prime Minister Paolo Gentiloni announced that 470 Italian soldiers would be deployed to Niger in an effort to mitigate the European migrant crisis.

== Current organization of Italian Armed Forces ==
Heraldic coat of arms of the Italian Armed Forces

The Italian Army, Navy, Air Force, and Carabinieri collectively form the Italian Armed Forces, under the command of the High Council of Defence, presided over by the President, per the Constitution of Italy. According to article 78, the Parliament has the authority to declare a state of war and vest the necessary war-making powers in the government.

Despite not being a branch of the armed forces, the Guardia di Finanza has military status and is organized along military lines. (Note: The Guardia di Finanza operates a large fleet of ships, aircraft and helicopters, enabling it to patrol Italy's waters and to participate in warfare scenarios.) Since 2005, military service has been voluntary. In 2010, the Italian military had 293,202 personnel on active duty, of which 114,778 are Carabinieri. As part of NATO's nuclear sharing strategy, Italy hosts 90 US B61 nuclear bombs located at the Ghedi and Aviano air bases.

The Army is the national ground defence force. It was formed in 1946, when Italy became a republic, from what remained of the "Royal Italian Army". Its best-known combat vehicles are the Dardo infantry fighting vehicle, the B1 Centauro tank destroyer, and the Ariete tank, and among its aircraft are the Mangusta attack helicopter, deployed on EU, NATO, and UN missions. It has at its disposal Leopard 1 and M113 armoured vehicles.

The Italian Navy is a blue-water navy. It was also formed in 1946 from what remained of the Regia Marina (the 'Royal Navy'). The Navy, being a member of the EU and NATO, has taken part in coalition peacekeeping operations around the world. In 2014, the Navy operated 154 vessels in service, including minor auxiliary vessels.

The Italian Air Force was founded as an independent service arm in 1923 by King Victor Emmanuel III as the Regia Aeronautica ('Royal Air Force'). After World War II, it was renamed as the Regia Aeronautica. In 2021, the Italian Air Force operated 219 combat jets. A transport capability is guaranteed by a fleet of 27 C-130Js and C-27J Spartan. The acrobatic display team is the Frecce Tricolori ('Tricolour Arrows').

An autonomous corps of the military, the Carabinieri are the gendarmerie and military police of Italy, policing the military and civilian population alongside Italy's other police forces. While different branches of the Carabinieri report to separate ministries, the corps reports to the Ministry of Internal Affairs when maintaining public order and security.

== Bibliography ==
- Arena, Nino. I Caccia Della Serie 5, Re2005, Mc205, Fiat G.G5 (in Italian). Modena, Italy: STEM-Mucchi, 1976. ISBN 90-70310-11-2.
- Arfaioli, Maurizio. The Black Bands of Giovanni: Infantry and Diplomacy During the Italian Wars (1526–1528). Pisa: Pisa University Press, Edizioni Plus, 2005. ISBN 88-8492-231-3.
- Baumgartner, Frederic J. Louis XII. New York: St. Martin's Press, 1994. ISBN 0-312-12072-9.
- Beales, Derek & Eugenio Biagini. The Risorgimento and the Unification of Italy. Second Edition. London: Longman, 2002. ISBN 0-582-36958-4
- Black, Jeremy. "Dynasty Forged by Fire." MHQ: The Quarterly Journal of Military History 18, no. 3 (Spring 2006): 34–43. ISSN 1040-5992.
- Blaxland, Gregory (1979). Alexander's Generals (the Italian Campaign 1944–1945). London: William Kimber. ISBN 0-7183-0386-5.
- Blockmans, Wim. Emperor Charles V, 1500–1558. Translated by Isola van den Hoven-Vardon. New York: Oxford University Press, 2002. ISBN 0-340-73110-9. online
- Brignoli, Marziano (2012). Il generale Luigi Cadorna. Udine: Gaspari Editore.
- Frieser, Karl-Heinz; Schmider, Klaus; Schönherr, Klaus; Schreiber, Gerhard; Ungváry, Kristián; Wegner, Bernd (2007). Die Ostfront 1943/44 – Der Krieg im Osten und an den Nebenfronten [The Eastern Front 1943–1944: The War in the East and on the Neighbouring Fronts]. Das Deutsche Reich und der Zweite Weltkrieg [Germany and the Second World War] (in German). Vol. VIII. München: Deutsche Verlags-Anstalt. ISBN 978-3-421-06235-2.
- Geloso, Carlo. Il primo anno di Guerra. Milano: Corbaccio.
- Guicciardini, Francesco. The History of Italy. Translated by Sydney Alexander. Princeton: Princeton University Press, 1984. ISBN 0-691-00800-0.
- Hackett, Francis. Francis the First. Garden City, New York: Doubleday, Doran & Co., 1937.
- Hall, Bert. Weapons and Warfare in Renaissance Europe: Gunpowder, Technology, and Tactics. Baltimore: Johns Hopkins University Press, 1997. ISBN 0-8018-5531-4.
- Hart, B. H. Liddell. History of the Second World War. New York: G.P. Putnam's Sons, 1970.
- Kertzer, David. Prisoner of the Vatican. Boston: Houghton Mifflin Company, 2004.
- Konstam, Angus. Pavia 1525: The Climax of the Italian Wars. Oxford: Osprey Publishing, 1996. ISBN 1-85532-504-7.
- Mack Smith, Denis. Italy: A Modern History. Ann Arbor: The University of Michigan Press, 1959. Library of Congress Catalog Card Number: 5962503 online
- Marshall, S. L. A.; Josephy, Alvin M. (1982). The American heritage history of World War I. American Heritage Pub. Co. : Bonanza Books : Distributed by Crown Publishers. ISBN 9780517385555. OCLC 1028047398.
- Nicolle, David (2005). Italian Medieval Armies 1300-1500. Osprey Publishing.
- Norwich, John Julius. A History of Venice. New York: Vintage Books, 1989. ISBN 0-679-72197-5.
- Oman, Charles. A History of the Art of War in the Sixteenth Century. London: Methuen & Co., 1937.
- Paoletti, Ciro et al. "Current Situation of Italian Military Historiography." International Bibliography of Military History 29.1 (2008): 244-251.
- Phillips, Charles and Alan Axelrod. Encyclopedia of Wars. 3 vols. New York: Facts on File, 2005. ISBN 0-8160-2851-6.
- Pompé, Daniel; et al., eds. (1924). Ordres de bataille des grandes unités - Divisions d'Infanterie, Divisions de Cavalerie. Tome X. 2e Volume [10,2]. Les armées françaises dans la Grande guerre. Based on Official Documents by Direction of the Ministère De la Guerre, Etat-Major de l'Armée – Service Historique (in French) (1st ed.). Paris: Imprimerie Nationale.
- Scala, Edoardo (1959). Storia delle fanterie italiane: le fanterie nella prima guerra mondiale, vol. V,. Biblioteca storica de Il Giornale.
- Taylor, Frederick Lewis. The Art of War in Italy, 1494–1529. Westport, Conn.: Greenwood Press, 1973. ISBN 0-8371-5025-6.
