= Battle of Agordat =

Battle of Agordat may refer to:

- First Battle of Agordat (1890)
- Second Battle of Agordat (1893)
- Battle of Agordat (1941)
