= Battle of Serobeti =

- Part of the Mahdist War
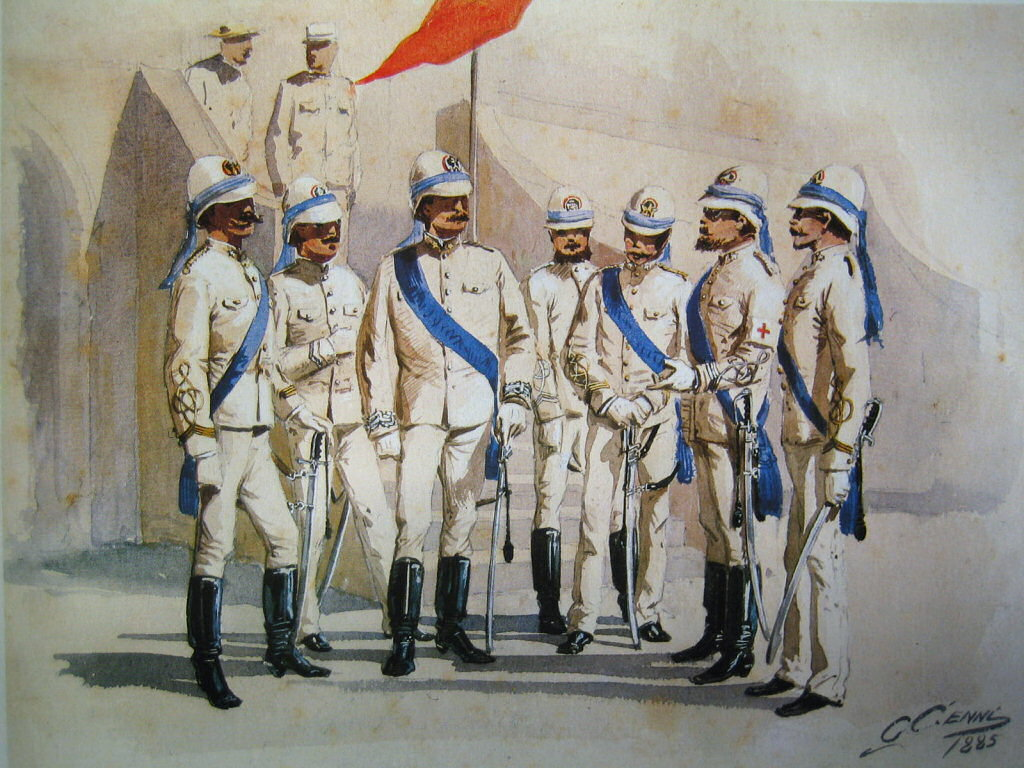
- Ufficiali italiani in Africa (1885) by Quinto Cenni
| Date | 26 June 1892 |
| Location | Serobeti, Italian Eritrea |
| Result | Italian victory |

Belligerents
| Italy | Mahdist State |

Commanders and leaders
| Stefano Hidalgo; Michele Spreafico | Ibrahim Massamil; Ibrahim Faragiallah |

Strength
| 120 ascari and about 200 warriors of the Baria tribe | 1,000 Infantry; 100 cavalry |

Casualties and losses
| 3 killed and 10 wounded | 100 dead and wounded |

The Battle of Serobeti took place on June 26, 1892, and was fought between Italy and the Mahdist State. The incident took place when one-thousand Mahdist warriors entered Italian Eritrea and were driven back by an Italian-led force of 120 ascari and 200 Baria tribe warriors. In all, Italian losses were three dead and ten wounded, while the Mahdists suffered around one-hundred killed and wounded. Author Sean McLachlan blames the Mahdists' "inferior weaponry and fire discipline" for their defeat at Serobeti and the preceding First Battle of Agordat (1890).

== Background ==
The First Battle of Agordat made Muhammad Ahmad's followers more cautious. The Emir of Cassala had threatened to take revenge for the battle, but besides a few other small raids, would hesitate to commit to a major action. Meanwhile, the Italians had occupied Agordat as their outpost, building a fort to defend and garrison it with a company of askari. The Italian victory at Agordat, the completion of the fort and hiring bands of mercenaries along the Barka River, giving impetus to trade relations with Sudan. It would take around two years before the Italians clashed again against the Mahdists on 16 June 1892.

== The Battle ==
The Mahdists resumed their efforts in June 1892, advancing along the Barka to resume their raids but on 16 June, the same day of their return, Italian forces commanded by Captain Stefano Hidalgo and Lieutenant Michele Spreafico encountered a group of Mahdists commanded by Emir Ibrahim Massamil and led by Ibrahim Faragiallah (Farajallāh) encountered in the plain of Serobeti along the Mogoreb stream. At the time of the encounter the Italians had 300 men, while the Mahdists had as many as 900. Despite the fact that the Hidalgo's forces had found the enemy to be more numerous, already deployed in combat order on advantageous terrain, the Italian commander launched an attack and overwhelmed the Mahdist forces in less than two hours. The Italian forces killed around forty Mahdists and took at least a hundred prisoners and took possession of six flags, numerous weapons and all the grain and livestock that the enemy had raided from several villages of the Barka who were allies of the Italians and the Askari. For his actions at Serobeti, Captain Hidalgo received the Knight's Cross of the Military Order of Savoy, as well as a solemn commendation of the Ministers of War and Foreign Affairs, Benedetto Brin. Ibrahim Faragiallah (Farajallāh) had previously suffered a defeat at the hands of Captain Gustavo Fara.
