= Gustavo Fara =

Italian general and politician

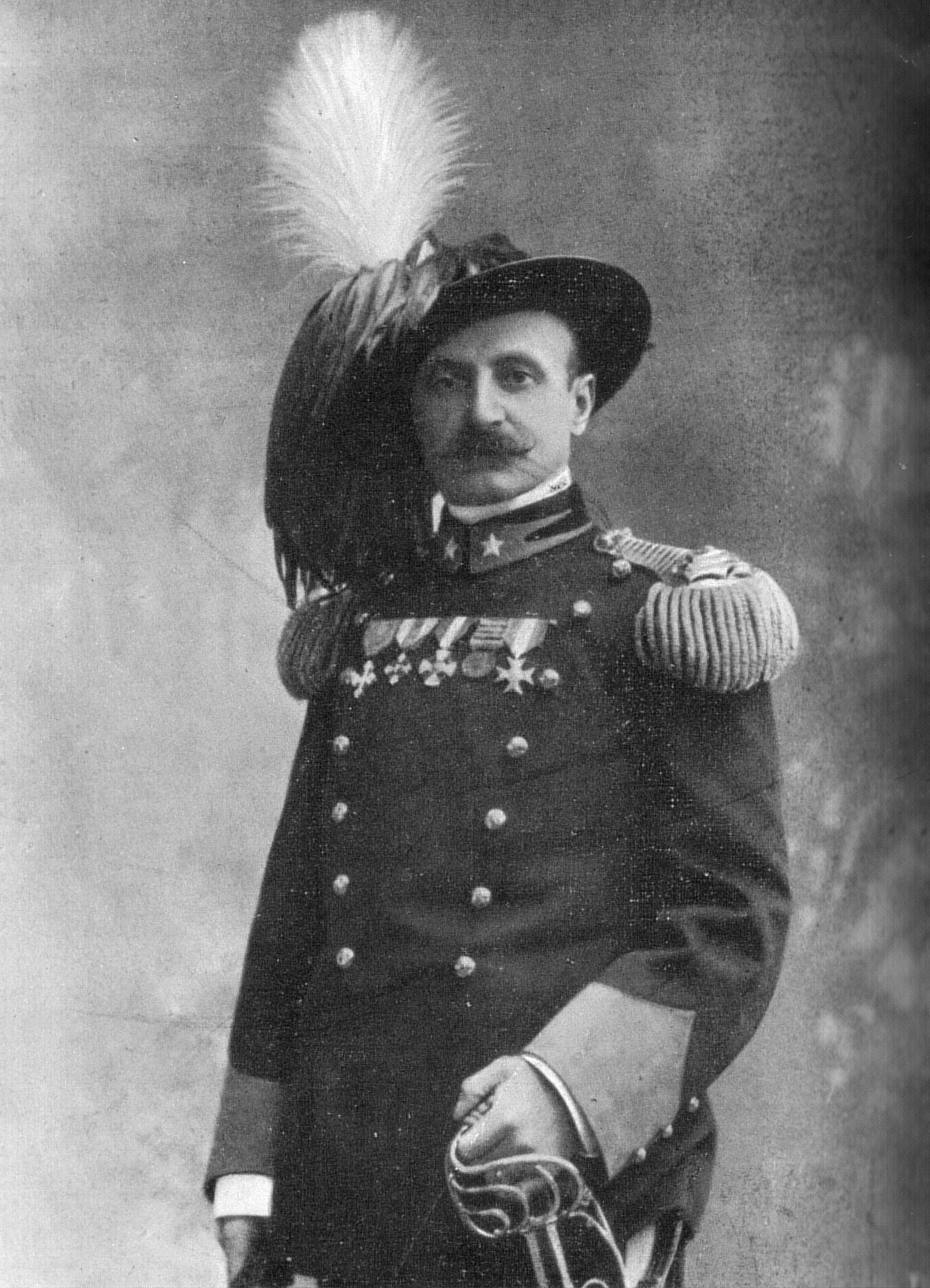
- Gustavo Fara in 1911

Senator of the Kingdom of Italy
- In office December 22, 1928 – February 24, 1936
- Monarch: Vittorio Emanuele III
- Prime Minister: Benito Mussolini

Personal details
- Born: September 18, 1859 Orta San Giulio, Sardinia-Piedmont
- Died: February 24, 1936 (aged 76) Nervi, Liguria, Kingdom of Italy

Military service
- Allegiance: Kingdom of Italy
- Branch: Royal Italian Army
- Years of service: 1878–1920; 1922–1928
- Rank: Lieutenant General
- Battles/wars: Italo-Ethiopian War of 1887–1889; Mahdist War: First Battle of Agordat; Italo-Turkish War: Battle and massacre at Shar al-Shatt; Battle of Bir Tabraz; Battle of Gargaresc (1912); Battles of Zanzur (1912); World War I

Gustavo Fara (18 September 1859 – 24 February 1936) was an Italian general and politician.

== Biography ==
=== Early years ===
Fara was born in Orta San Giulio on 18 September 1859; he was the son of Carlo Fara and Antonietta Bedone. As a young man, determined to undertake a military career, he attended the Military Academy of Modena from which he left in July 1879 with the rank of second lieutenant, being assigned to the 8th Bersaglieri Regiment with which he remained throughout his career. In 1881 he was promoted to lieutenant and then returned to the Modena academy in 1883 with the aim of teaching military history and art.

Reached the rank of captain in April 1888, Fara asked to be assigned as a volunteer for the Italian colonies in Africa and in October of that same year he left for Eritrea, where in January of the following year he was assigned as commander of the 3rd company of the Askari which was participating in the march on Asmara.

He fought in Agordat in 1890, which earned him the knight's cross of the Military Order of Savoy. In the action, Fara managed to surprise the enemies who were advancing towards the sea and threatened to occupy the Eritrean colony commanded by General Orero: the Fara sent two companies of Ascari to reinforce the ranks of Major Cortese with whom he headed to the attack by Dega, blocking the enemies at the Damatai gorge, precisely near Agordat where the clash took place where it was also possible to recover the loot looted in Beni Amer and free several prisoners.

Falling ill with malaria in 1891, he was forced to return to his homeland where, after recovering, he was assigned to the 18th Bersaglieri regiment and married on 30 August 1893 with Giulia Mazzoni. He was then promoted to major in 1899, he obtained command of the XXXIV battalion of the 10th Bersaglieri regiment, reaching the rank of lieutenant colonel in 1905. In 1910 he was finally promoted to colonel and obtained command of the 11th Bersaglieri regiment.

=== The war in Libya and the action on Bir Tobraz ===
Considering the experience he acquired with the war in Eritrea and the distinction acquired on the battlefield, Gustavo Fara took part following the Italo-Turkish War leading the 11th Bersaglieri Regiment in the Battle and massacre at Shar al-Shatt, where he led the resistance of the Henni fort preventing the defeat from turning into a rout.

General Pecori Giraldi who had assumed command of the Ain Zara oasis on December 18 launched an operation against the oasis of Bir Tobraz (14 km south of ʿAin Zara). The Italian general had received the news that some chieftains of Arabs who had sworn allegiance to Italy had been taken prisoners by other hostile Arabs, therefore he decided to send a rescue expedition to the oasis of Bir Tobraz where he presumed they had been taken as prisoners. Without informing General Caneva Pecori-giraldi he sent Colonel Fara's 11th Bersaglieri Regiment on a mission with about 3,000 men. The expedition left during the night hoping to attack the enemy camp at dawn but the local guides who had been assigned did not find their target and the unit wandered for seven hours in the desert until it found the enemy camp. The Italians then decided to attack but went against the wrong side of the camp and soon found themselves caught between two fires. At this point Fara decided to disengage the department and assumed a square formation repelled the enemy attacks for the whole day until the approaching night the Arabs withdrew. The Italian column began the fast retreat towards Ain Zara, abandoning all the useless material and also the bodies of the fallen. On the way back, Fara's column intercepted a rescue brigade that was also lost. The report of the expedition attracted harsh criticism against General Pecori Giraldi who had wanted the action and following an investigation he was relieved of his post in February 1912. The general reacted by attributing the blame to Fara. General Luigi Cadorna became aware of the accusations brought by Pecori Giraldi to his subordinate, accused him of incompetence and recommended promotion to general for Colonel Fara who he defined as "a real soldier". Fara was later promoted to major general for war merits in 1911. It appears in some photographs taken by the French war correspondent Gaston Chérau, who also mentions the heroic behavior of Gustavo Fara in the letters exchanged with his wife.

On March 31, 1912, he was initiated into Freemasonry in the Neapolitan lodge of the Grand Orient of Italy Sons of Garibaldi, but he attended the lodge for just a few months.

After the war in Libya, on March 26, 1913, the Fara was chosen to take command of the "Friuli" brigade, at the same time abandoning Freemasonry by resigning from the "Darwin" Lodge of Naples, in obedience to the Grand Orient of Italy, of which he was a member.

== World War I ==
With the outbreak of the First World War, Gustavo Fara obtained command of the 24th division stationed in Carnia and was promoted to lieutenant general before passing to command of the 4th division, with which he took part in the capture of Sabotino (24 October 1915), where was injured. Having recovered from his wounds, he asked to be sent back to the front in command of the 19th division, with which he helped to counter the offensive launched by the Austrians in Val Lagarina. He distinguished himself with the 14th division in Monfalcone where he earned a silver medal for military valor.

The ability of the Fara in any case emerged in a preponderant way in the last phases of the Great War: in August 1917 he constituted the 47th Bersaglieri division with which he took part in the eleventh offensive of the Isonzo, managing to cross the river and reach the plateau of the Bainsizza, obtaining the rank of commander of the military order of Savoy. In October of that same year he fought on Monte Grappa and from 1918 he obtained command of the 23rd Bersaglieri division, distinguishing himself on the Piave and Paradiso, where he obtained other honors.

With the end of the conflict, in January 1919 he was assigned to the army corps stationed in Florence, but already the following year he was discharged and left his military career on July 20, 1920.

== Politics and proximity to early fascism ==
After his retirement, General Fara decided to retire to his summer residence in Nervi where he approached the political world. Close to the nascent fascism, he promoted the first Fascio di Combattimento di Nervi which was established in 1921 on the occasion of the local elections but officially joined the movement on May 2, 1922. In September 1922 he met Emilio De Bono and Benito Mussolini for the first time, reminding the latter that he was the commander of the 11th regiment in which he himself had served and that he was ready to support the cause of insurrection of the fascist movement. For these reasons he participated in the march on Rome in October 1922 together with the column of Ulysses Igliori, and became lieutenant general of the Voluntary Militia for National Security, as well as inspector general of the same militia.

A few months after the March on Rome, the Voluntary Militia for National Security was officially institutionalized and regularized and for this reason, Fara decided like other former officers to join it, enthusiastic to be able to return "to active service", remaining in this position until 1928 when he retired and was awarded the rank of army corps commander. Between 1924 and 1925 he was also royal commissioner at L'Aquila, after the liberal mayor Vincenzo Speranza left office due to conflicts with the new regime.

He was appointed Senator of the Kingdom on December 22, 1928, and resigned on February 24, 1936; dying on the same day in Nervi.

== Awards ==
- Knight of the Military Order of Savoy

- August 24, 1890

- Commander of the Military Order of Savoy

- August 31, 1917

- Grand Officer of the Military Order of Savoy

- November 11, 1920

- Medal of Military Valor (Golden Medal)

- "For the eminent qualities of a brave and brilliant soldier under enemy fire explained and first after his promotion for war merit, in the numerous battles of the Libyan campaign in which he took part." - Ain Zara - December 4, 1911

- Medal of Military Valor (Silver Medal)
- Knight of the Order of the Crown of Italy

- March 8, 1900

- Commander of the Order of the Crown of Italy

- December 28, 1911

- Grand Officer of the Order of the Crown of Italy

- June 3, 1916

- Knight of the Grand Cross of the Order of the Crown of Italy

- June 3, 1916

- Knight of the Order of Saints Maurice and Lazarus

- January 12, 1911

- Officer of the Order of Saints Maurice and Lazarus

- January 15, 1914

- Commander of the Order of Saints Maurice and Lazarus

- July 24, 1919

- Grand Officer of the Order of Saints Maurice and Lazarus

- September 14, 1920

- Grand Officer of the Colonial Order of the Star of Italy

- January 29, 1925

- Maurician medal
- Cross for seniority of military service
- War Merit Cross
- Medal in memory of the African campaign
- Commemorative Medal for the Italo-Turkish War 1911-1912
- Commemorative Medal for the Italo-Austrian War 1915–1918
- Commemorative Medal of the Unity of Italy
- Commemorative medal of the March on Rome, Golden Medal

- October 28, 1922

== Bibliography ==
- Mola, Aldo Alessandro (2018). Storia della Massoneria in Italia dal 1717 al 2018. Milano-Firenze: Bompiani/Giunti.
- Vivarelli, Roberto (2012). Storia delle origini del fascismo. Vol. III. Il Mulino2.
- Bandini, Franco (1971). Gli italiani in Africa storia delle guerre colonialili 1882-1943. Milano: Longanesi & C.
- Vandervort, Bruce (2012). Verso la quarta sponda la guerra italiana per la Libia (1911-1912). Roma: Stato maggiore dell'esercito.
- "Gustavo Fara". Digiland.
