= Agordat =

Town in Gash-Barka, Eritrea

Agordat Ak'ordat
- Town
- Location within Eritrea
- Coordinates: 15°33′N 37°53′E
- Country: Eritrea
- Region: Gash-Barka
- Time zone: UTC+3 (EAT)
- Climate: BWh

Agordat (also spelled Akordat or Ak'ordat) is a city in Gash-Barka, Eritrea. It was the capital of the former Barka Province, which was situated between the present-day Gash-Barka and Anseba regions.

== History ==
Agordat was historically a key center along the old caravan trade route connecting eastern and northern Sudan to Eritrea, due to its strategic location near the Barka River. During the period of Funj hegemony in Sudan, the nabtab became the ruling class of the Beni-Amer, with their center established around Agordat. It was from the Funj that the vassal Beni-Amer chief, the diglal, received his emblem of rank and authority. His permanent camp was located a few kilometers from what is now the town of Agordat.

Although the diglal's growing power was weakened by the Mahdist invasion between 1885 and 1893, he remained in control of the region. In June 1890, an Italian military expedition, which had already built a small fort near Agordat, allied itself with the Beni-Amer. In 1893, they successfully defeated the Mahdist army in the Barka region at the First Battle of Agordat and the Second Battle of Agordat.

Agordat later developed into an administrative center under Italian rule, leading to the establishment of a hospital and an Italian-Arabic school. In 1928, a railroad from Asmara to Keren was extended to Agordat. By 1938, the town's population was estimated at 2,050, including 168 Italians, as well as workers from various parts of Eritrea, Sudanese, Arabs, and West Africans (Tukrir). By 1943, the population had grown further, though only a few members of the Beni-Amer elite (nabtab) and the diglal resided within the city itself, with many others living in camps on its outskirts. During the 1940s and 1950s, Italian entrepreneurs cultivated banana and citrus plantations along the Barka River, contributing to the town's economic growth.

During the Eritrean-Ethiopian Federation, Agordat experienced political instability. The Muslim population—particularly those from the western lowlands—faced suppression under Emperor Haile Selassie I. As a result, Agordat became a focal point for political activism. The town emerged as a key center for the early Eritrean Liberation Front (ELF). In July 1962, ELF operatives bombed a ceremony attended by Imperial representatives and the Eritrean Chief Executive, killing four officials and wounding 60 civilians in the ensuing police gunfire. Throughout the 1960s, repression and guerrilla resistance persisted, transforming Agordat into a major Ethiopian garrison town.

Between 1972 and 1975, ELF attacks around Agordat intensified. On March 9, 1975, the Ethiopian Army massacred 208 people, prompting most of the population to flee to Sudan. In September 1977, ELF forces liberated Agordat, but the Ethiopian Army recaptured it in July 1978. In April 1988, Agordat was once again liberated, this time by the Eritrean People's Liberation Front (EPLF).

After Eritrean independence, the population of Agordat and its surrounding villages was estimated to be between 45,000 and 65,000, following the return of many former refugees from Sudan. The majority of Agordat's residents engage in agriculture and pastoralism, while others produce baskets, mats, and other goods from coconut trees. The town has developed a range of social services, including elementary and junior schools, a high school, and a hospital. It also houses administrative buildings, including offices for the Ministry of Agriculture.

== Overview ==
Agordat lies in the western part of the country on the Barka River. An important market town and it also home to a large mosque. Agordat has many restaurants, as well as a hospital built during the colonial period in Italian Eritrea. A considerable amount of Eritrea's fruit and vegetables, particularly bananas and oranges, are transported through the town. Additionally, the Akat fruit is grown locally.

== Climate ==
Ak'ordat has a hot arid climate (Köppen BWh) with hot to sweltering temperatures throughout the year and a short wet season from mid-June to mid-September due to the northward extension of the West African Monsoon and the African Easterly Jet.

Climate data for Ak'ordat
Month	Jan	Feb	Mar	Apr	May	Jun	Jul	Aug	Sep	Oct	Nov	Dec	Year
Mean daily maximum °C (°F)	32 (89)	33 (92)	36 (96)	39 (103)	40 (104)	37 (99)	33 (91)	32 (89)	35 (95)	37 (99)	36 (96)	33 (92)	35 (95)
Mean daily minimum °C (°F)	14 (58)	14 (57)	14 (58)	18 (65)	22 (72)	22 (72)	21 (69)	21 (70)	21 (69)	21 (70)	19 (67)	16 (61)	19 (66)
Average rainfall mm (inches)	0 (0)	0 (0)	0 (0)	0 (0)	10 (0.4)	30 (1.2)	100 (3.9)	140 (5.5)	40 (1.6)	0 (0)	0 (0)	0 (0)	320 (12.6)
Source: Weatherbase

== See also ==
- History of Eritrea
- Battle of Agordat (1941)
- First Battle of Agordat
- Second Battle of Agordat
- Italian cruiser Agordat
