= Second Battle of Agordat =

- Part of the Mahdist War
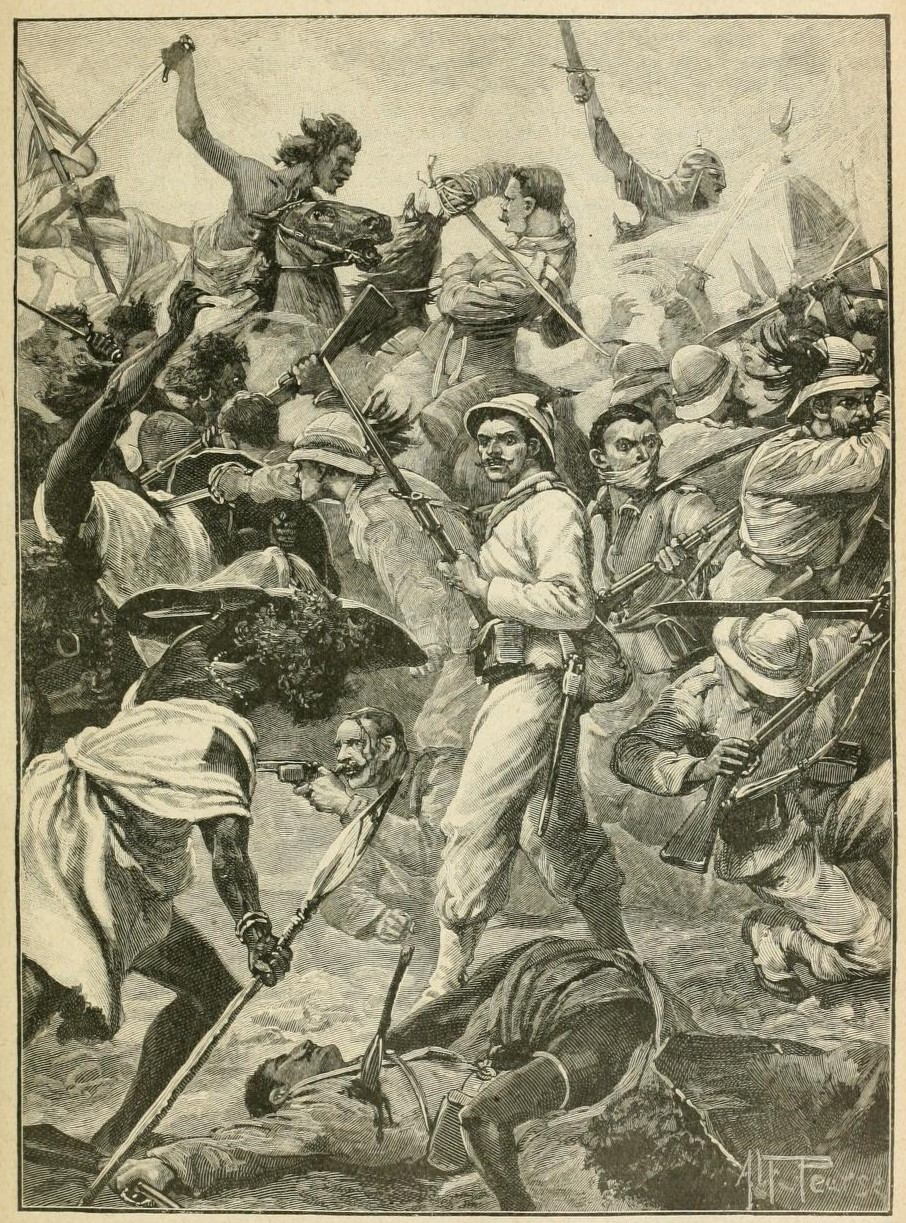
- Alfred Pearse: Second Battle of Agordat (Battles of the nineteenth century, 1901)
Date	21 December 1893
Location	Agordat, Eritrea
Result	Italian victory

Belligerents
Kingdom of Italy	Mahdist State

Commanders and leaders
(Kingdom of Italy) Col.Giuseppe Arimondi	Emir Ahmed Ali †

Strength
75 Italians (42 officers) and 2,100–2,400 Eritrean Askaris	10,000–12,000 Mahdists; 6,000 armed with rifles

Casualties and losses
108 killed 124 wounded	1,000+ killed hundreds wounded 180 men, 700 rifles and 72 flags captured

The Second Battle of Agordat was fought in late December 1893, between Italian colonial troops and Mahdists from Sudan. Emir Ahmed Ali campaigned against the Italian forces in eastern Sudan and led about 10,000–12,000 men east from Kassala. This force encountered 2,400 Italians and their Eritrean askaris at Agordat, west of Asmara, commanded by Colonel Arimondi. Over 1,000 Dervishes, including the Emir, were killed in severe fighting. The outcome of the battle constituted "...the first decisive victory yet won by Europeans against the Sudanese revolutionaries,..."

A year later, Italian colonial forces seized Kassala.
