= First Battle of Agordat =

1890 battle of the Mahdist War

- Part of the Mahdist War
- The fight of Agordat against the Dervishes, by Gennaro D'Amato (1890)
Date	27 June 1890
Location	Agordat, Italian Eritrea
Result	Italian victory

Belligerents
Italy	Mahdist State

Commanders and leaders
Gustavo Fara	Unknown

Strength
2 ascari companies	1,000

Casualties and losses
3 killed and 8 wounded	~250 killed

The First Battle of Agordat, which took place on 27 June 1890 was the first battle between Italy and the Mahdist State.

== Background ==
In 1885, the Kingdom of Italy—taking advantage that the British and the Egyptians were busy fighting the Mahdi uprising—took the port city of Massawa and soon after almost the entire Eritrean coast as the Egyptians had little choice but to abandon their garrisons in the region while facing Muhammad Ahmad followers. The British also encouraged Italian expansion to counter French influence in the Horn of Africa. After occupying the city of Keren, the Italians found themselves having to defend their new territorial acquisitions against Mahdist incursions: in February and April 1890, the dervishes retreated after a column with 888 troops and two artillery pieces led by Major Fadda approached, though the Mahdists would conduct persistent raids that prompted the Italians to send punitive expeditions against them.

== The battle ==
Fighting began when a force of one-thousand Mahdists attacked tribes that had signed protectorates with the Kingdom of Italy, and threatening the road to Keren. The Sudanese continued on to the wells at Agordat, where they were met by two companies of Eritrean ascaris led by Captain Gustavo Fara that managed to rout the invaders, driving them back to Kassala.

Casualties were around 250 Mahdists killed, while the Italian side counted three dead and eight wounded. Author Sean McLachlan attributes the Mahdists' defeat at both Agordat and the upcoming Battle of Serobeti (1892) to their "inferior weaponry and fire discipline".
