= List of massacres in Ethiopia =

The following is a list of massacres that have occurred in Ethiopia (numbers may be approximate):

== List of massacres ==
Name	Date	Location	Deaths	Perpetrator	Notes
Sack of Aksum	around 960	Kingdom of Aksum	Unknown	Gudit's army	
Battle of Das	3 July 1332	Adal	~10,000+	Ethiopian Empire	
Islamgee massacre	9 April 1868	Islamgee	307	Soldiers of Tewodros II	
Aanolee massacre	6 September 1886	Hitosa, Oromia	11,000	Emperor Menelik II's army	
Dolo hospital airstrike	30 December 1935	Dolo	22–30	Italy Italian Air Force	
Gondrand massacre	13 February 1936	Mai Lahlà	120	Ethiopian Empire	
Lekemti massacre [it]	26-27 June 1936	Nekemte, Oromia	12	Students of the military school of Olettà	
Yekatit 12	19–21 February 1937	Addis Ababa	19,200-30,000	Kingdom of Italy	
Vogra Massacre	1937	Village of Vogra	67	Kingdom of Italy	
Gaia Zeret massacre	9-11 April 1939	Ametsegna Washa, Village of Zeret	2,500	Kingdom of Italy	
Arafali Massacre	1970	Arafali	32	Ethiopian Empire	
Atshoma Massacre	1970	Atshoma	88	Ethiopian Empire	
Basadare Massacre	November 1970	Basadare	112	Ethiopian Empire	
Ona Massacre	1 December 1970	Ona	625	Ethiopian Empire	
Elabored Massacre	27 January 1971	Elabored	60	Ethiopian Empire	
Massacre of the Sixty	23 November 1974	Addis Ababa	60	Derg	
Red Terror (Ethiopia)	23 September 1976 – 22 March 1978	Ethiopia	10,000–980,000	Derg	
Wukro air raid	8 April–3 May 1988	Wukro, Tigray	176	Derg	
Hawzen massacre	22 June 1988	Hawzen, Tigray	2,500	Derg	
Sheraro air raid	12 December 1988	Sheraro, Tigray	8		
Chercher air raid	9 September 1989	Chercher, Tigray	148		
Gobye air raid	9–10 September 1989	Gobye, Wollo	22		
Mekelle air raid	27–29 October 1989	Mekelle, Tigray	31		
Nefas Mewcha air raid	13 January 1990	Nefas Mewcha, Gondar	23		
Isitayoh air raid	28 January 1990	Isitayoh, Wollo	40		
Ticha air raid	10 June 1990	Ticha, Shewa	23		
Killings of the Koore people	1994 to present	Amaro woreda zone; Gedeo; West Guji	Ongoing. 52+ killed; 15+ injured; Hundreds of IDPs from the conflict areas. Civilians homes burned down and livestocks stolen	OLF or OLF-shene, militants from various ethnic groups in SNNPR (Southern Nations, Nationalities, and Peoples' Region) and Oromia regions	
Civilians killing in Konso	1994 to present	Konso	Ongoing. 83+ killed; 57+ injured; 1 million+ displaced; Civilian houses burned down	Various militants from (Southern Nations, Nationalities, and Peoples' Region) and regions	
Didessa massacre	29 June 2003	Didessa	17	Soldier Jaafar	
Gambela massacre	December 2003	Gambela, Southern Nations, Nationalities, and Peoples' Region	100	ENDF's 43rd Division	
Massacre in Addis Ababa	June and November 2005	Addis Ababa	193	Government of Ethiopia during EPRDF's regime	
2012 Afar region tourist attack	17 January 2012	Erta Ale, Afar Region	5	Eritrean-trained groups	
2012 Gambella bus attack	12 March 2012	Gambella	19	Gunmen with machine guns	
2014–2016 Oromo protests	25 April 2014 – December 2016	Oromia Region, Addis Ababa north-western, southern and eastern part of the regions Ambo, Dembi Dolo, and Nekemte,Amhara Region, Gondar and Bahir Dar	5,000+	Government of Ethiopia	
Burayu massacre	14–16 September 2018	Addis Ababa and Burayu, Oromia	58-65	Pro-OLF and "mobs" of Oromo youth, Oromo Liberation Army	
Shashemene massacre	30 June–2 July 2020	Oromia, Addis Ababa, Shashemene, and Jimma	240+	Organized Oromo youth, Oromo Liberation Army, Ethiopia Ethiopian Federal Police	
Humera massacre	November 2020	Humera, Tigray	92	(Amhara Region) Amharan militias/Fano; (Ethiopia) ENDF	
Gawa Qanqa massacre	2 November 2020	Gawa Qanqa, West Welega Zone	32-54	Oromo Liberation Army. (Disputed) with (Ethiopia) Ethiopian Government. Allegation of collaboration.	
Mai Kadra massacre	9–10 November 2020	Mai Kadra, Disputed land between Amhara and Tigray	1100+	Tigray People's Liberation Front (TPLF); Pro-TPLF militias; Ethiopian National Defence Force; Pro-Ethiopia militias	
2020 Ethiopia bus attack	November 14, 2020	Benishangul-Gumuz	34	* Gumuz militiamen	
Hitsats massacre	November 19, 2020	Hitsats refugee camp	300	Eritrea; Tigray People's Liberation Front	
Kombolcha massacre	October 30, 2021	Kombolcha, Amhara region	100+	Tigray forces: TPLF and TDF	
Aksum massacre	19 November–20 December 2020	Aksum	720-800	Eritrea	
Hagere Selam massacres	4–14 December 2020	Hagere Selam and Addi Qoylo	90	Ethiopian National Defence Force; Eritrea	
Metekel massacre	22–23 December 2020	Bikuji, Benishangul-Gumuz	142+	Gumuz militiamen; Oromo Liberation Army	
Debre Abbay massacre	5–6 January 2021	Debre Abbay, Tigray	40	Ethiopian National Defence Force	
Kola Tembien February 2021 massacres	February 10, 2021	Kola Tembien, Tigray	182	Ethiopian National Defense Force; Eritrea	
Abo church massacre	March 05, 2021	East Welega Zone, Oromia	29 to 40+	Oromo Liberation Army	
2021 Ataye clashes	March 18 and April 16, 2021	Amhara region	584+	OLA, (Ethiopia) ENDF	
Galikoma massacre	August 05, 2021	Gulina, Afar region	107+	Tigray People's Liberation Front (TPLF)	
Chenna massacre	31 August 2021 to 4 September 2021	Dabat, Amhara region	120 to 200	Tigray People's Liberation Front (TPLF)	
Kobo massacre	September 09, 2021	Kobo (woreda), Amhara region	600+	Tigray People's Liberation Front (TPLF)	
Ayisid Kebele massacre	March 3, 2022	Ayisid Kebele, Metekel Zone, Benishangul-Gumuz	11	Oromo Liberation Army	
Tole massacre	June 20, 2022	Tole village, West Welega Zone, Oromia	554+	Oromo Liberation Army	
Qelem Wollega massacre	June 20, 2022	Kellem, Oromia	308+ killed; 36 injured	Oromo Liberation Army	
Ano massacre	February 2-4, 2023	Ano, Seyo Woreda, East Welega Zone, Oromia	50+ killed; 8 injured	Oromo Liberation Army	
Finote Selam drone strike	August 13, 2023	Finote Selam, West Gojjam Zone, Amhara Region	30	(Ethiopia) ENDF	
Merawi massacre	29–30 January 2024	Merawi, West Gojjam, Amhara Region	50–100+	(Ethiopia) ENDF	

== See also ==
- List of massacres in the Eritrean War of Independence
- Attacks on humanitarian workers
