= Hawzen in the Tigray war =

Massacre in Hawzen, Central Tigray as part of Tigray war

Coordinates: 13.97967°N 39.42942°E

Hawzen in the Tigray War
- Part of Tigray War
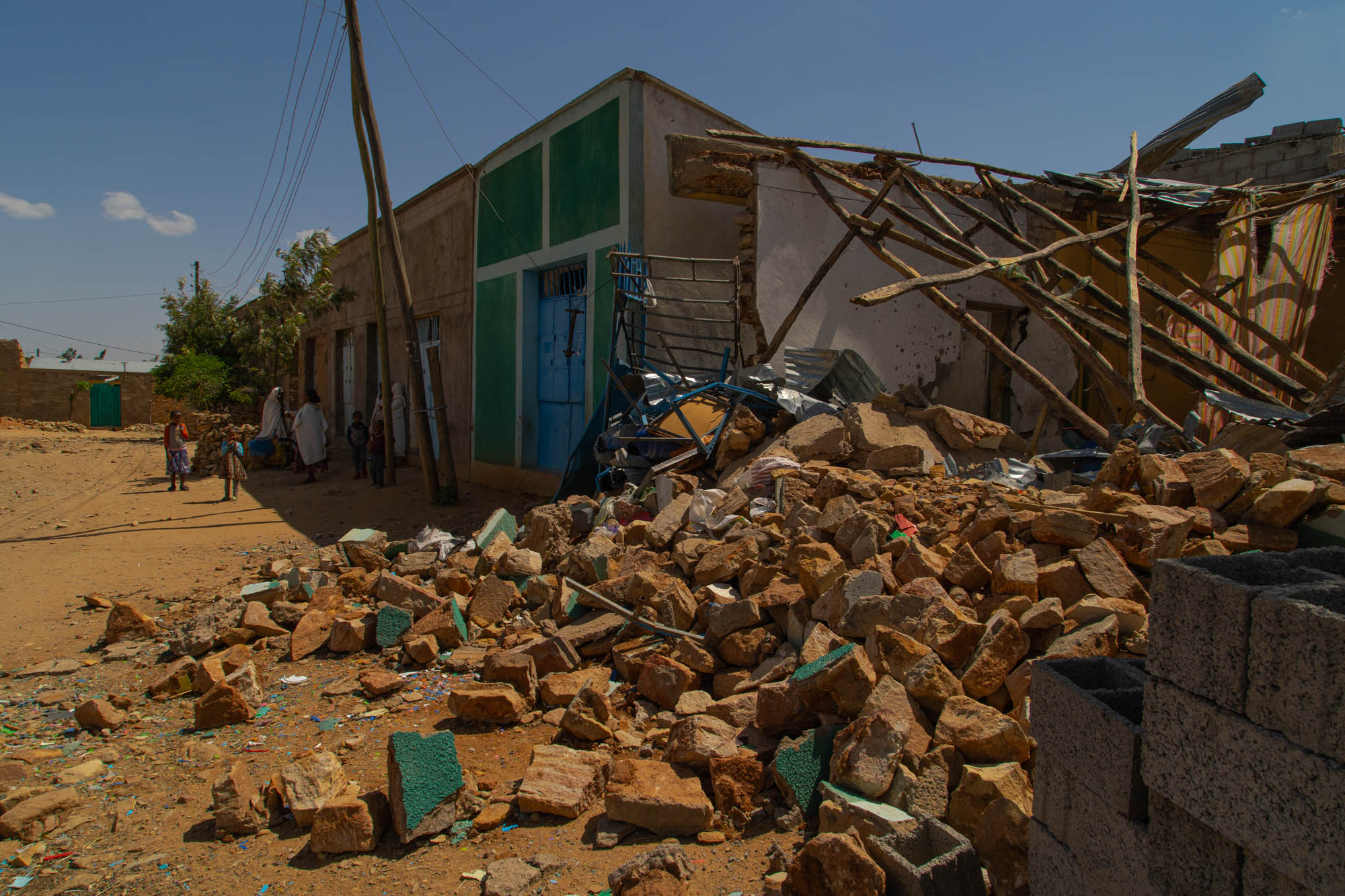
- 6 June 2021, house destroyed in a battle in Hawzen

- Location of Hawzen in Ethiopia
- Location: Hawzen, Tigray Region, Ethiopia
- Target: Tigrayans
- Attack type: Mass killing; Shelling
- Deaths: 8 civilians
- Perpetrators: (Ethiopia) Ethiopian National Defence Force (Eritrea) Eritrean Defence Forces

Events in Hawzen in the Tigray War included five mass extrajudicial killings that took place in Hawzen in the Tigray Region of Ethiopia during the Tigray War in November and December 2020 and January and February 2021, looting and destruction Hawzen Primary Hospital by the Eritrean Defence Force (EDF), and the establishment of a rape camp in the hospital by the Ethiopian National Defense Forces (ENDF).

== Military events ==
Hawzen (also transcribed as Hawzien or Hauzien), the capital of Hawzen Woreda, in the Eastern zone of Tigray, is a small town with a few thousand inhabitants. Six incidents of heavy fighting and bombing took place from November 2020 to August 2021 during the Tigray War.

=== November 2020 ===
From 25 to 27 November 2020, the Ethiopian National Defense Force (ENDF) and Eritrean Defence Forces (EDF) killed 8 civilians in Hawzen (Eastern Tigray). In the wake of the battles, they organised a killing spree that spread towards the nearby small towns of Megab and Koraro.

=== December 2020 ===
The Ethiopian National Defense Force (ENDF) and Eritrean Defence Forces (EDF) killed five civilians in Hawzen (Eastern Tigray) on 1 December 2020.

The EDF carried out a massacre in Hawzen around 23 December 2020. Estimates are up to seventy people killed.

=== January 2021 ===
The ENDF and EDF killed thirty civilians in Hawzen on 23 January 2021. The EHRC–OHCHR Tigray investigation reported the massacres in this locality, without going into further detail.

=== February 2021 ===
The ENDF and EDF killed eleven civilians in Hawzen from 8 to 14 February 2021.

=== Perpetrators ===
Witnesses interpreted the identity of the late November perpetrators as Ethiopian and Eritrean soldiers.

Local residents identified the perpetrators of the late December massacre as mainly EDF, identified as Eritrean by cheek markings and pronunciation when speaking Tigrinya, and some ENDF and Amhara special forces.

== Rape camp ==
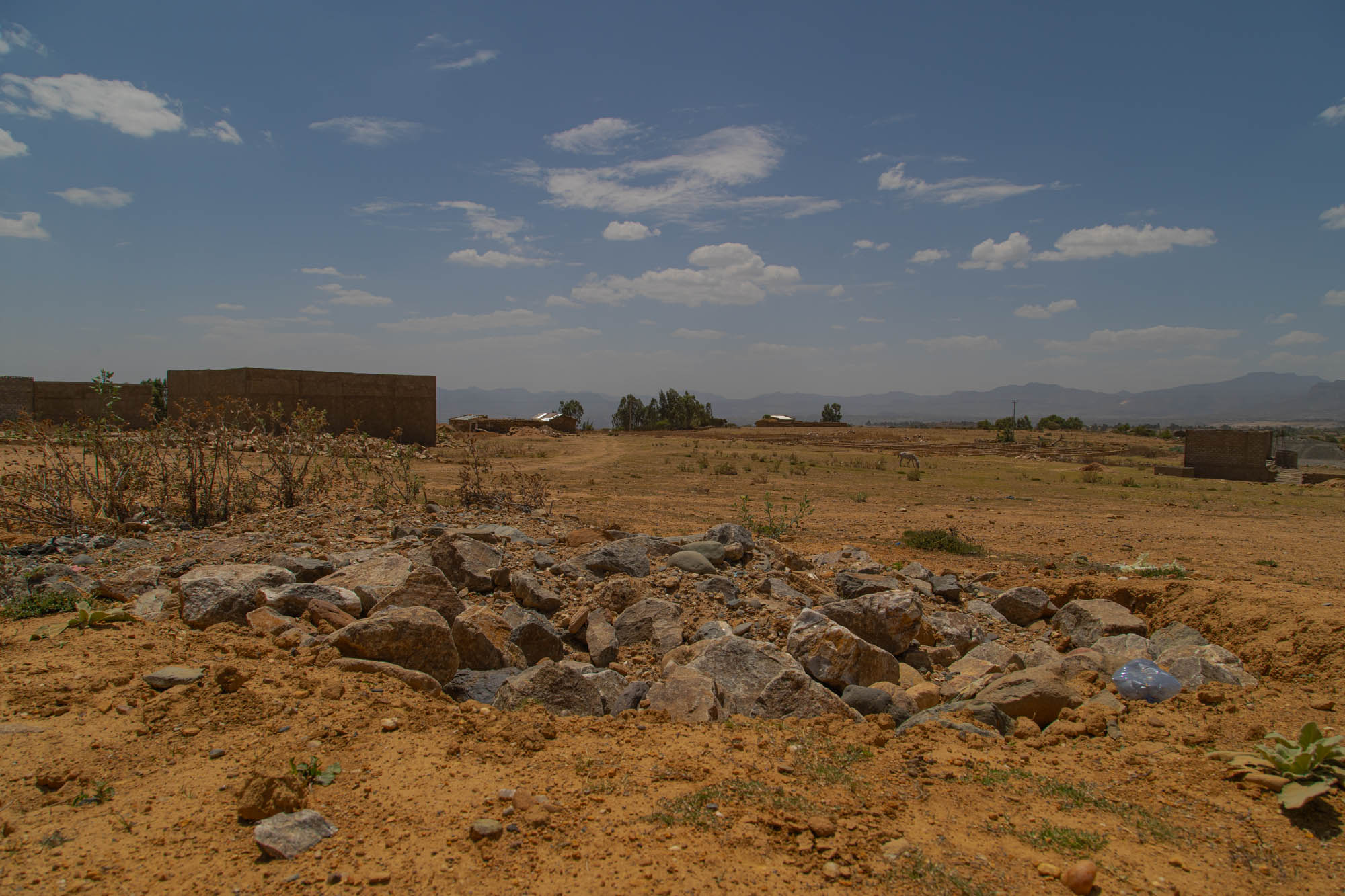
A dozen of civilians are buried in this grave in Hawzen – photo on 6 June 2021

Hawzen Primary Hospital was looted and destroyed by the EDF. The ENDF used the hospital as a military base several times. In one of the periods of ENDF military use of the hospital, the ENDF established the hospital as a rape camp, holding captive girls and women that they had brought with them into Hawzen. The beds normally meant for medical patients were used for the rapes. Methods used to prevent girls and women from escaping included tying them to the beds or locking doors.

== See also ==
- Hawzen massacre (1988)
