= Orlando Lorenzini =

Italian general (1890–1941)

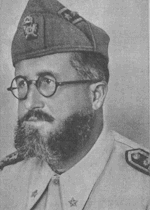
- Born: 3 May 1890; Guardistallo, Tuscany, Italy
- Died: 17 March 1941 (aged 50); Keren, Italian Eritrea
- Military career
- Allegiance: Kingdom of Italy
- Branch: Royal Italian Army
- Service years: 1910–1941
- Rank: Generale di Brigata (Brigadier-General)
- Commands: 2099th Machine-gun Company; 14th Eritrean Battalion; 22nd Eritrean Battalion; 2nd Colonial Brigade; 11th Colonial Brigade; 4th Colonial Division
- Conflicts: Italo-Turkish War; World War I: Second Battle of the Piave River; Pacification of Libya; Second Italo-Ethiopian War; World War II: Invasion of British Somaliland; Battle of Agordat; Battle of Keren †
- Awards: Gold Medal of Military Valor (posthumous); Silver Medal of Military Valor (five times); Bronze Medal of Military Valor; War Merit Cross (five times)

Orlando Lorenzini (3 May 1890 – 17 March 1941) was an Italian general during World War II, posthumously awarded the Gold Medal of Military Valor during World War II.

== Biography ==
=== Early life and career ===
Lorenzini was born in Guardistallo, Pisa province, son of Giuseppe Lorenzini and Maria Giuntini. He entered the S. Quirico Salesian Boarding School in Collesalvetti in 1895, and later attended the Volterra Seminary High School and the Galileo Galilei High School in Pisa, where he graduated. He began his military career on 20 May 1910, when he was drafted as a private in the 84th Infantry Regiment; he fought in the Italo-Turkish War and became an officer on 4 February 1912. During World War I, Lorenzini fought with the rank of captain on the Italian front, where he commanded the 2099th Machine-gun Company of the "Udine" Brigade in the Montello sector. He received a Silver Medal of Military Valor for an action on 18 June 1918, on Montello, during the Second Battle of the Piave River; he also received a War Merit Cross in 1919.

In the 1920s, Lorenzini fought for several years in Cyrenaica and Fezzan during the campaign for the pacification of Libya. He was mentioned in dispatches in July 1924 for inflicting a defeat on the Senussi rebels in the Jebel Auaghir area, in command of a squadron of armed vehicles; in 1925 he was made a Knight of the Colonial Order of the Star of Italy, and in 1926 he received another War Merit Cross and was promoted to major following a 20-month campaign in the Central Jebel. In the summer of 1927, Lorenzini commanded an armoured car squadron during a successful campaign in the Cyrenaic Jebel, where he pursued and destroyed a group of Libyan rebels in August 1927; in March 1928, he was made a Knight of the Military Order of Savoy for this action and was again mentioned in dispatches by the Governor of Cyrenaica. Between January and February 1928, his armoured car squadron fought the rebels between Gifa and Jalo, which led to a second Silver Medal of Military Valor being awarded to him in May 1929.

=== East Africa ===
In December 1931 Lorenzini was made an Officer of the Colonial Order of the Star of Italy, and in June 1933 he was made Commander of the same order. In September 1933 he received another War Merit Cross. In 1935 Lorenzini, by then commander of the 14th Eritrean Battalion, was sent on a secret mission to contact the Danakil people with the aim of making an alliance with them in the imminent Second Italo-Ethiopian War. He then fought in the war as commander of the 14th and 22nd Eritrean Battalion; on 15 October 1936, he was awarded a Bronze Medal of Military Valor for a successful action against Ethiopian troops. After the Italian victory and the annexation of Ethiopia to Italian East Africa, Lorenzini remained in East Africa, commanding the 11th Colonial Brigade and the 2nd Colonial Brigade, fighting against Ethiopian guerrillas. In June 1937 he led a colonial brigade in a successful three-day battle against the guerrillas in Shewa, which earned him another Silver Medal of Military Valor. In the same year, he was made Knight of the Order of Saints Maurice and Lazarus and in the following year also Officer of the Order of the Crown of Italy, in addition to receiving a further War Merit Cross. Between April and July 1938, Lorenzini led his colonial brigade in fierce fighting against the Arbegnoch fighters in the Goggiam region, obtaining a victory and his fourth Silver Medal of Military Valor.

In 1939 Lorenzini was promoted to colonel for merit of war, following long campaigns in East Africa, and was awarded another War Merit Cross. Between August 1938 and May 1940, Lorenzini fought in six campaigns of counterguerrilla operations in Shewa. For the successes in these campaigns, he would receive a fifth Silver Medal of Military Valor in February 1941.

According to Frederic Wehrey, Lorenzini was responsible for a chemical attack with mustard gas on rebels that sheltered at Ametsegna Washa cave. After the rebels surrendered, Italian troops separated the men and adolescent boys of fighting age from the women and small children. Tying the males together at the shoulders in groups of two, they marched them away from the cave. About 800 Ethiopian men and boys were killed outside the cave, either by gunshot or by being pushed to their deaths into a deep canyon. "No rebel [has] escaped deserved punishment," Colonel Lorenzini cabled to his superiors.

=== World War II ===
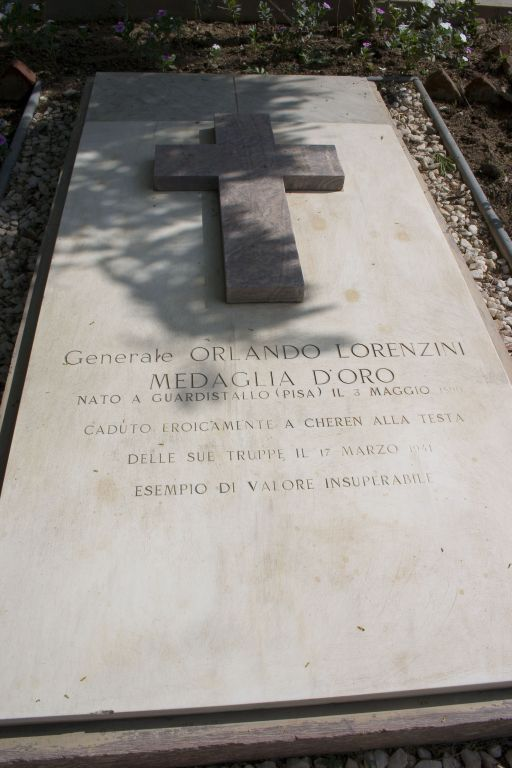
Tomb in Keren cemetery

When World War II broke out, Lorenzini was in command of the 2nd Colonial Brigade in Italian East Africa. In August 1940 he took part in the Italian conquest of British Somaliland, after which he was promoted for war merit to the rank of Brigadier-General. When the British Commonwealth launched its counteroffensive from Sudan, in early 1941, Lorenzini and his brigade were transferred to Keren, Eritrea, to defend Italian Eritrea. The Duke of Aosta, Viceroy of Italian East Africa, appointed Lorenzini commander of the 4th Colonial Division, and tasked him with halting the British advance against Agordat.

Lorenzini tried to strengthen the defences of Agordat; the battle began on 26 January 1941, and on 31 January, after suffering heavy losses, Lorenzini's men were forced to abandon the town; they slowed down the British advance by blowing up bridges and laying mines behind them, but they were forced to abandon all vehicles, tanks and guns when the normal road turned into a mule track. Lorenzini took command again of the 2nd Colonial Brigade and retreated to Keren, where the final battle for Eritrea would take place.

The Battle of Keren lasted from 5 February to 1 April 1941, and was the longest and the bloodiest of the East African Campaign. General Lorenzini was killed during the battle at 15:00 on 17 March 1941, by a grenade splinter. He was buried in the Asmara War Cemetery two days later, and posthumously awarded the Gold Medal of Military Valour.

His abilities won the posthumous respect of his enemies; in the official Indian military history of the campaign in East Africa, Compton Mackenzie referred to Lorenzini as gallant and praised his leadership of colonial troops in the first days of the battle of Keren.

== Sources ==
- Gian Carlo Stella, Paola Lorenzini Doveri Trent'anni d'Affrica. Vita del generale medaglia d'oro Orlando Lorenzini, Bagnacavallo, Ravenna, 20 maggio 1996.
- Angelo Del Boca, Italiani in Africa Orientale: La caduta dell'Impero, Laterza, Roma-Bari 1986, ISBN 88-420-2810-X.
