= Debre Maryam Qorqor =

Coordinates: 13°55′18″N 39°21′57″E

- ደብረ ማርያም ቆርቆር
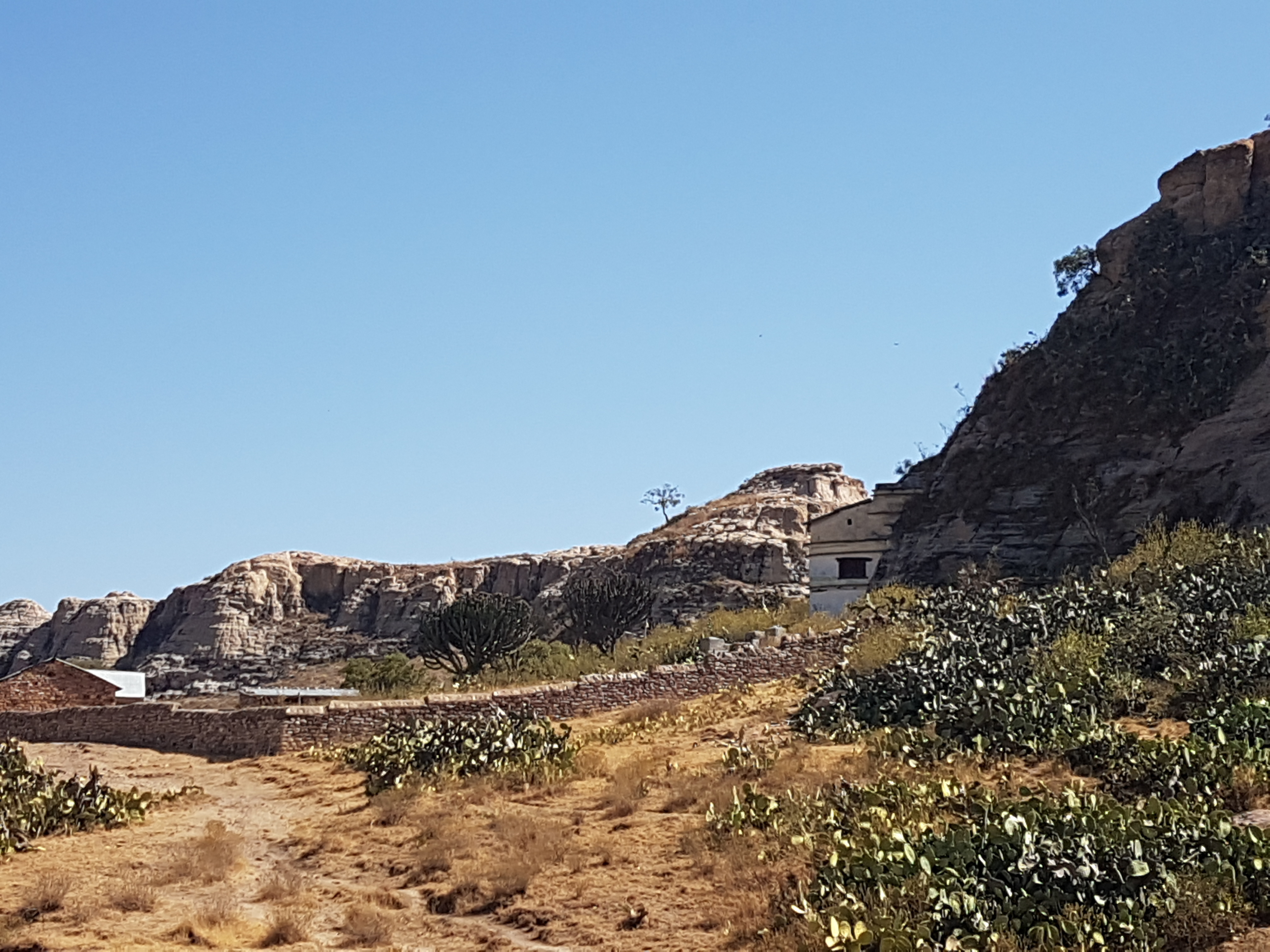
- Distant view of Debre Maryam Qorqor
- Interactive map of Debre Maryam Qorqor

Monastery information
- Full name: ገዳም ደብረ ማርያም ቆርቆር (Gädam Däbrä Maryam Qorqor)
- Order: Ethiopian Orthodox Tewahedo Church
- Established: 13th century (approximate, based on murals)
- Dedication: Saint Mary

People
- Founders: Unknown (tradition links to Abba Daniel of Qorqor; Saint Ewostatewos studied here)

Architecture
- Functional status: Active (monastic community and pilgrimage site)
- Style: Aksumite architecture

Site
- Location: Gheralta, Tigray Region, Ethiopia
- Country: Ethiopia
- Public access: Yes (pilgrimage and tourism)

Debre Maryam Qorqor, (Note: Ge'ez: ድብረ ማርያም ቆርቆር, romanized: Däbrä Maryam Qorqor, lit. 'Monastery of St. Mary of the Cliffs') is a large rock-hewn Orthodox Christian church located in the Gheralta cluster of Tigray, Ethiopia. It is one of the most architecturally and artistically significant rock churches of the region and remains in use by the Ethiopian Orthodox Tewahedo Church.

The church is situated on a high sandstone plateau near the village of Megab, approximately eight kilometres south of Hawzen, in the eastern Tigray region. To reach the church, visitors must climb a steep path of about 45 minutes to an hour. Its elevated position provides extensive views over the Gheralta mountains and central Tigray.

== History ==
The precise date of the excavation of Debre Maryam Qorqor is uncertain. Scholars have proposed a range of chronologies from the late Aksumite period (7th–8th centuries) to the early Solomonic era (13th–14th centuries). Architectural analysis by Jacques Mercier and Claude Lepage suggests that the sophistication of its cruciform pillars and decorated arches points to an early medieval origin, although later modifications and repainting complicate its dating.

Local tradition associates the church with monastic activity in the wider Gheralta region, which developed as a centre of Christian scholarship and asceticism. According to David Buxton, Maryam Qorqor was regarded as “one of the many important shrines in Gheralta” and likely functioned both as a monastic settlement and as a parish church.

The church's wall paintings are associated with the flourishing of Ethiopian Christian art during the 13th century. T. C. Tribe’s analysis of the frescoes indicates that at least three different painters were involved, suggesting that the decoration was carried out in phases over several generations of clerical patronage. Elements of the painting style reflect Byzantine and Coptic influences while remaining firmly rooted in Ethiopian artistic traditions.

During the medieval and early modern periods, the church remained part of the network of Tigrayan rock-hewn churches that reinforced the spread of the Ethiopian Orthodox Tewahedo Church in the northern highlands. Steven Kaplan argues that monastic institutions such as those associated with Maryam Qorqor played a central role in the Christianization of the Solomonic state and in shaping the relationship between church and monarchy. In the modern era, Debre Maryam Qorqor has continued to serve as a pilgrimage site and liturgical space for the local community. The church also attracted scholarly attention in the 20th century, with surveys conducted by explorers, historians, and art historians who documented its architecture and murals as part of the wider rediscovery of Tigray's rock-hewn heritage.

=== Legends and traditions ===
According to oral tradition, the foundation of Debre Maryam Qorqor is linked with Abba Daniel of Qorqor, a monk believed to have lived in the Gheralta mountains during the medieval period. Clerical memory credits him with painting some of the earliest murals of the church, and a nearby hermitage is associated with his name. Local legends recount that the church was miraculously protected from enemies. It is said that when hostile forces approached, the sanctuary would become hidden in a divine mist, making it invisible and preserving the monks who dwelt there. Such motifs are common in Ethiopian hagiographical traditions, where cliffside churches are considered divinely guarded refuges. The site is also associated with extreme asceticism. Hermits are said to have lived in the caves and ledges around the church, spending years in solitary prayer and descending only to participate in liturgical celebrations. To this day, Debre Maryam Qorqor is regarded as a holy place of intercession, and communities gather there on Marian feast days to honour the Virgin Mary with offerings of grain, incense, and candles.

== Architecture ==
Debre Maryam Korkor is among the largest rock-hewn churches in Tigray, measuring about 17 metres deep, 9 metres wide, and 6 metres high. The interior is laid out in a basilica-like plan with six massive cruciform pillars, bracket capitals, and arches. The church follows the tripartite division of nave, aisles, and sanctuary that is characteristic of Ethiopian Orthodox ecclesiastical architecture. The architectural sophistication of Debre Maryam Korkor has led scholars such as Jacques Mercier and Claude Lepage to suggest that it was carved during the late Aksumite or early medieval period, although precise dating remains debated.

The church is excavated in Adigrat Sandstone, a sedimentary rock typical of the Gheralta cluster. Geological studies show that this sandstone is relatively soft and easy to carve but vulnerable to erosion and salt weathering, which pose risks for the long-term preservation of the site.

=== Murals and iconography ===
The church preserves an important corpus of mural paintings and ceiling frescoes, which art historians date between the thirteenth century and later periods of repainting. Among the most striking depictions are representations of Adam and Eve, the Virgin Mary with the Christ child shown in utero, and Christ in Majesty. Archangels, apostles, and saints are also represented alongside decorative motifs of crosses, geometric patterns, and floral designs. Art historian T. C. Tribe identified at least three different artistic hands in the decoration of the church, suggesting that the frescoes were executed at different times and by different painters. Marilyn E. Heldman has shown that elements of the painting style reflect Byzantine and Coptic influences while remaining rooted in Ethiopian artistic traditions.

== Status and Significance ==
Maryam Korkor is part of the broader network of more than 120 rock-hewn churches in Tigray identified by architectural surveys. Local tradition associates the site with early monastic communities, although historical documentation remains limited. Scholars such as Steven Kaplan argue that such monasteries and churches played a key role in consolidating Ethiopian Orthodox identity during the early Solomonic period, particularly in peripheral regions like Gheralta.

The rock-hewn churches of Tigray, including Debre Maryam Korkor, have been proposed for inclusion on the UNESCO World Heritage Tentative List. They are considered unique testimonies of Ethiopia's medieval Christian heritage, comparable in importance to the better-known rock-hewn churches of Lalibela. Today, the church remains an active site of worship and pilgrimage under the Ethiopian Orthodox Tewahedo Church.

== See also ==
- Ethiopian Orthodox Tewahedo Church
- Ethiopian architecture
- Ethiopian art
- Lalibela
- Abuna Yemata Guh
