= Hawzen massacre (1988) =

- Part of the Ethiopian Civil War
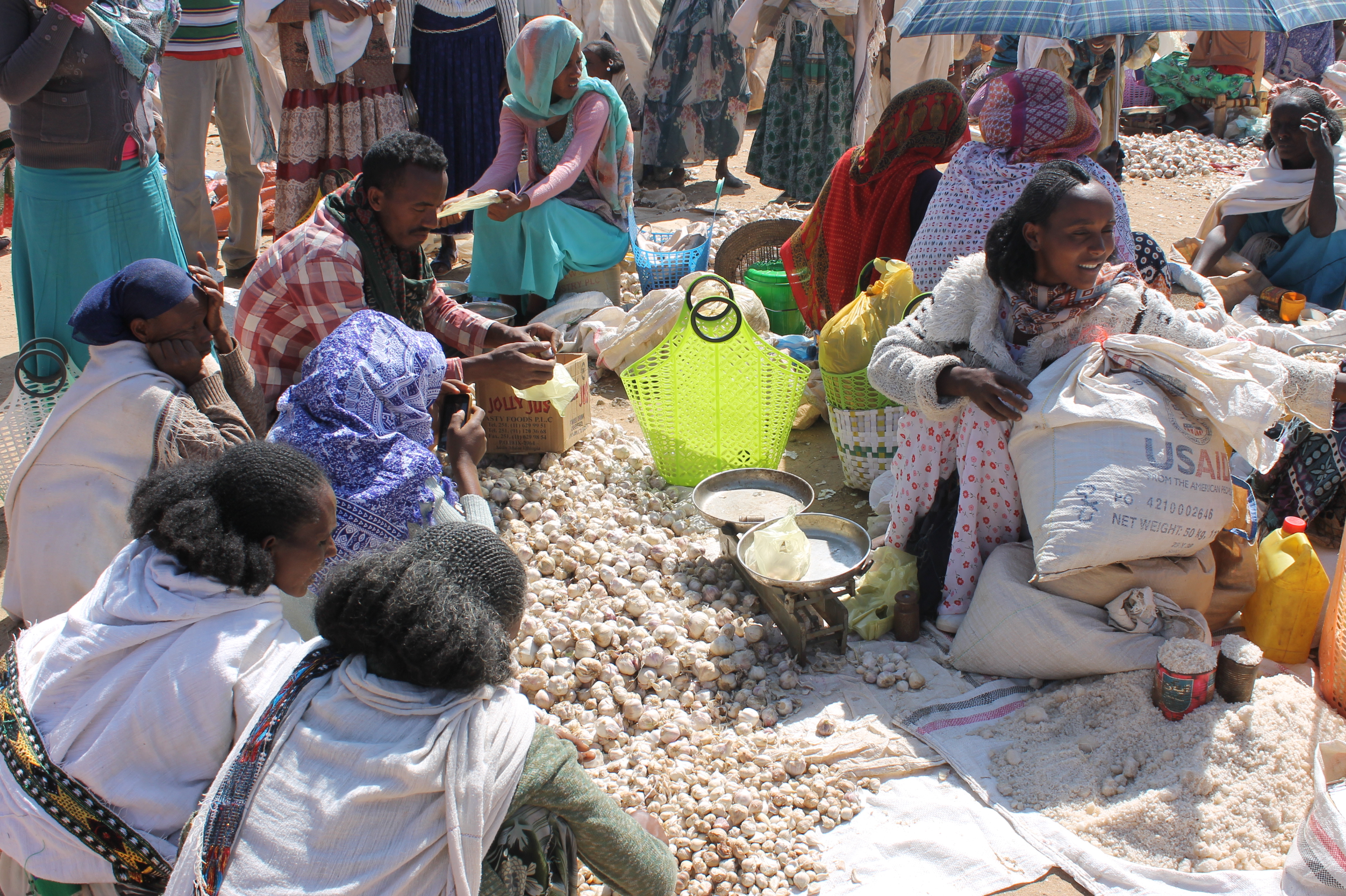
- The marketplace at Hawzen, the area targeted
- Location: Hawzen, Ethiopia
- Date: 22 June 1988
- Target: Tigrayans
- Deaths: 1,800 to 2,500
- Perpetrator: People's Democratic Republic of Ethiopia

The Hawzen massacre (also transcribed as Hawzien or Hauzien massacre) was a massacre committed by Derg forces in Ethiopia on 22 June 1988 during the Ethiopian Civil War. On that day, Mig and helicopter gunships adhering to the Third Revolutionary Army (TRA) bombed the marketplace in Hawzen, Tigray, killing 1,800 to 2,500 civilians and wounding about a thousand.

The military justified the attack by claiming thousands of TPLF fighters had congregated in Hawzen. In addition to the human victims, camels were reportedly targeted because the rebels used them to transport weapons and supplies. Four ancient stelae were also toppled in the bombardment.

According to former TPLF leader Aregawi Berhe, the attack was made at the direction, or at least tacit permission, of Legesse Asfaw, commander of the armed forces in Tigray.

In 2008, five top military officials from the Derg regime were sentenced to death by an Ethiopian court for their role in the Hawzen massacre; however, in 2011, these sentences were commuted to life imprisonment.

== See also ==
- List of massacres in Ethiopia
- Hawzen in the Tigray War
