= Koraro =

Village in the Tigray Region of Ethiopia

Koraro (Tigrinya: ቆራሮ), also transliteratd as Qoraro, is a village in north Ethiopia's Tigray Region, located in the Hawzen woreda, near Hawzen, in a cluster of 11 villages with a total of 55,000 residents. This village is located about 16 kilometres (10 mi) from a dry weather road. Due to such long distances and some communication infrastructure, Koraro is quite isolated.

It is in an area surrounded by cactuses and dusty land. The 11 villages span an area of several thousand square kilometres, stitched together by extremely poor or non-existent roads, making traveling between the villages and local commercial centers, such as Hawzen and Mekelle, very difficult. Koraro is one of the most remote and isolated sites and suffers from very poor infrastructure and severe drought. The region is semiarid with a short rainy season that lasts from the end of June to the beginning of September.

== Sources ==
- IRC International Water and Sanitation Centre
- Koraro, Ethiopia at Millennium Villages
