= Hawzen (woreda) =

Coordinates: 14°00′N 39°20′E

Hawzen ሓውዜን
- Woreda
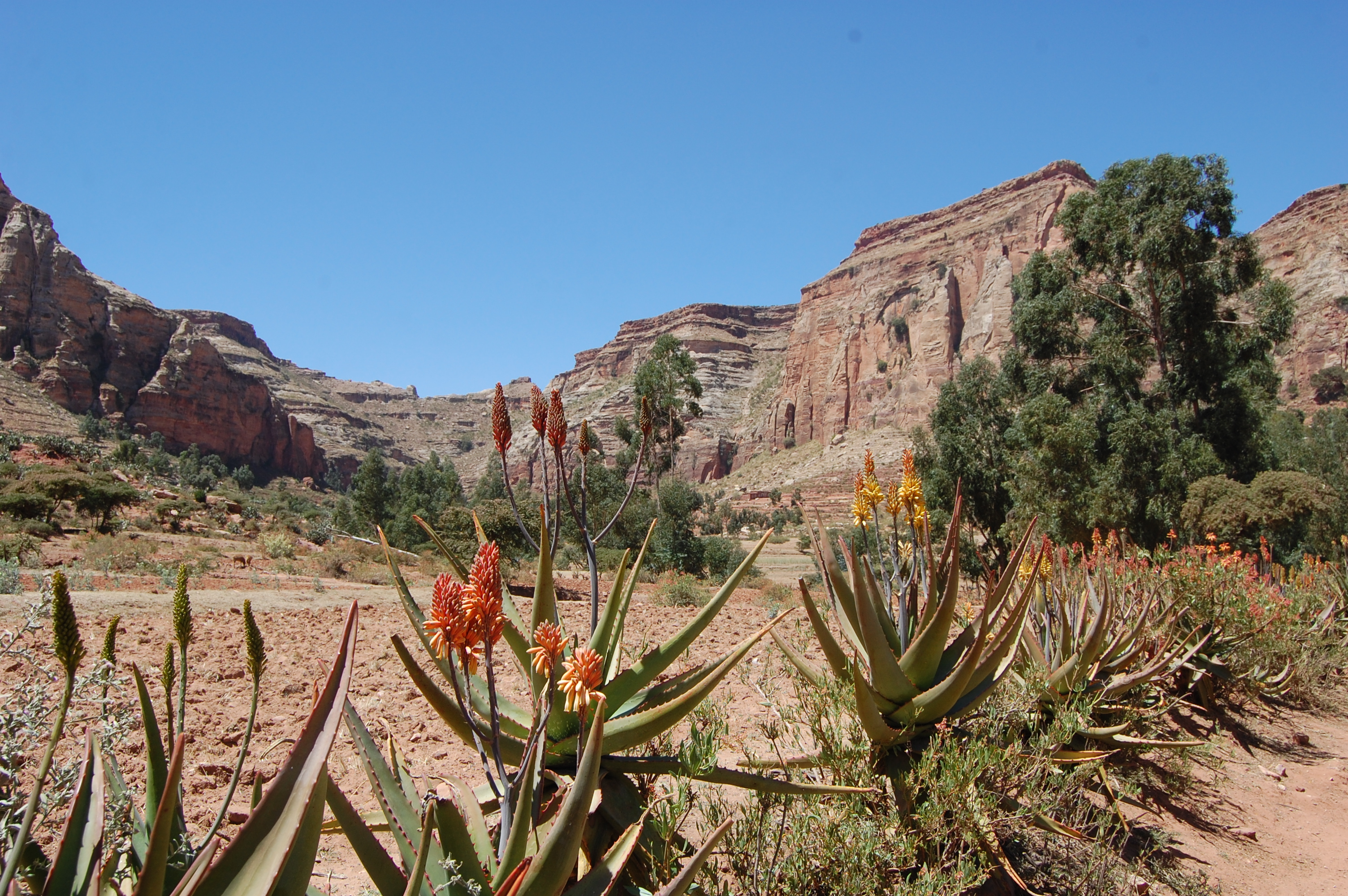

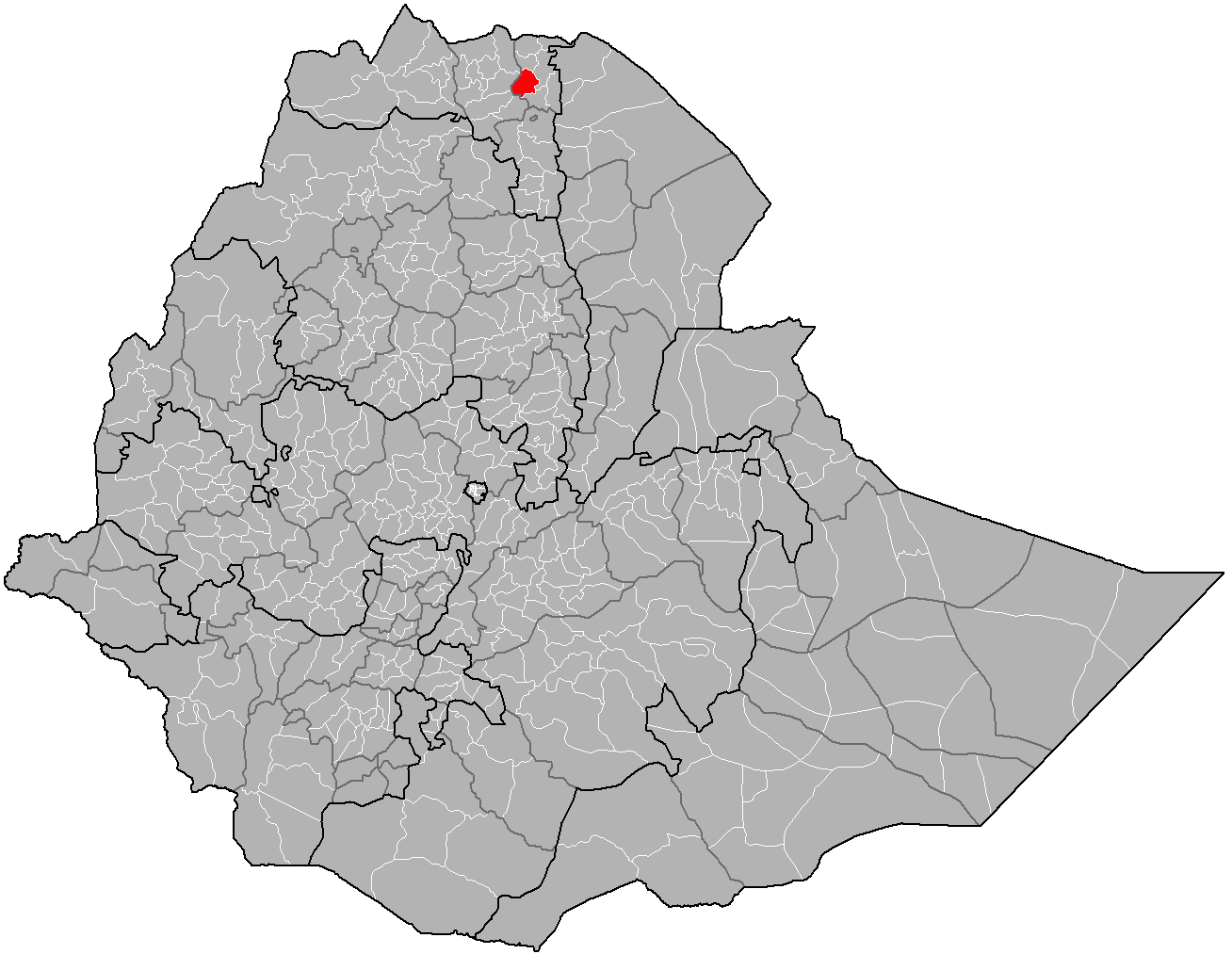
- Country: Ethiopia
- Region: Tigray
- Zone: Misraqawi (Eastern)

Area
  - Total: 1,892.69 km^{2} (730.77 sq mi)

Population (2007)
  - Total: 117,954

Hawzen (Tigrinya: ሓውዜን) is an Ethiopian District or woreda in the Tigray Region of Ethiopia. Part of the Misraqawi Zone, Hawzen is bordered on the south by Kilte Awulaelo, on the west by the Mehakelegnaw (Central) Zone, on the north by Ganta Afeshum, and on the east by Saesi Tsaedaemba. Towns in Hawzen include Hawzen and Megab; villages include Koraro.

== Gere-alta ==
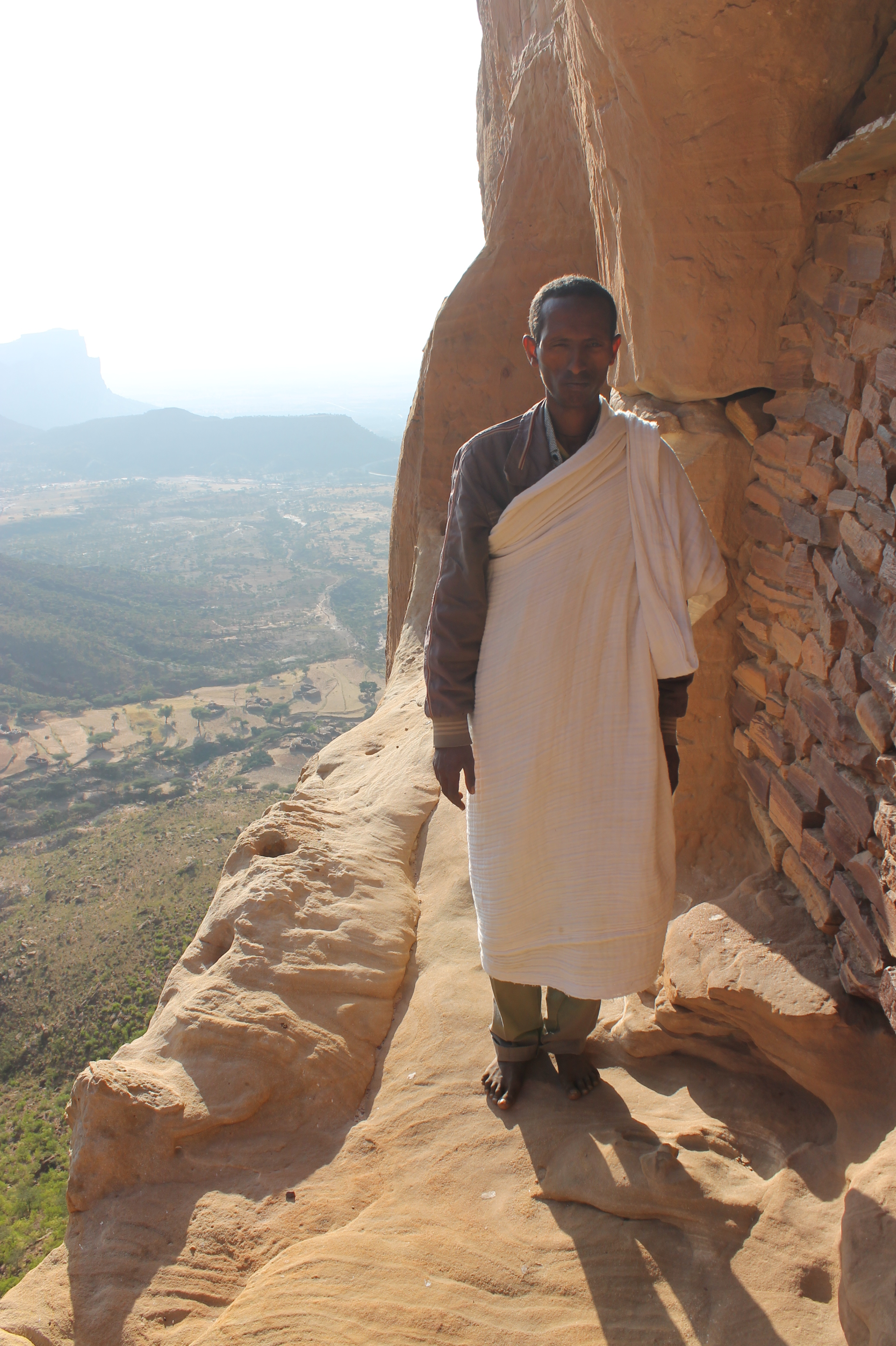
Monk standing in front of Abuna Yemata Guh's entrance

The western portion of the woreda covers a region known as Gar'alta (Gere-alta). Ger'alta appears on indigenous maps of the northern Horn of Africa in the fifteenth century. Gere-alta has been an integral part of the former Enderta province, when Enderta was an independent province as well as when it was an awraja. During the imperial times (until 1975), the Gere-alta woreda consisted of the western parts of the current Hawzen and Kilte Awulaelo districts. The capital of the Gere-alta district was located at the town of Tsigereda, nowadays located in the western part of the Kilte Awulaelo district (south of the Hawzen district).

As described by Philip Briggs, the Gar'alta is "a fantastic spaghetti-western landscape of flat dry plains and towering rock outcrops" best known for its "35-odd rock-hewn churches, the largest concentration anywhere in Ethiopia."

There are several monolithic churches in the woreda, including: Hawzen Tekle Haymanot (near Hawzen town); Abuna Yemata Guh and Debre Maryam Qorqor (near Megab); and Dugem Selassie, Abuna Abraham Debre Tsion and Yohannes Maikudi (near the village of Dugem). Abuna Yemata Guh is also notable for its wall and dome paintings that David Buxton has dated to the fifteenth and sixteenth centuries "before the massive impact of external influences that occurred in the seventeenth century." One of the dome paintings represent nine of the Apostles, and the other eight of the Nine Saints, one of whom, Abuna Yem'ata, tradition credits founding the church.

== Demographics ==
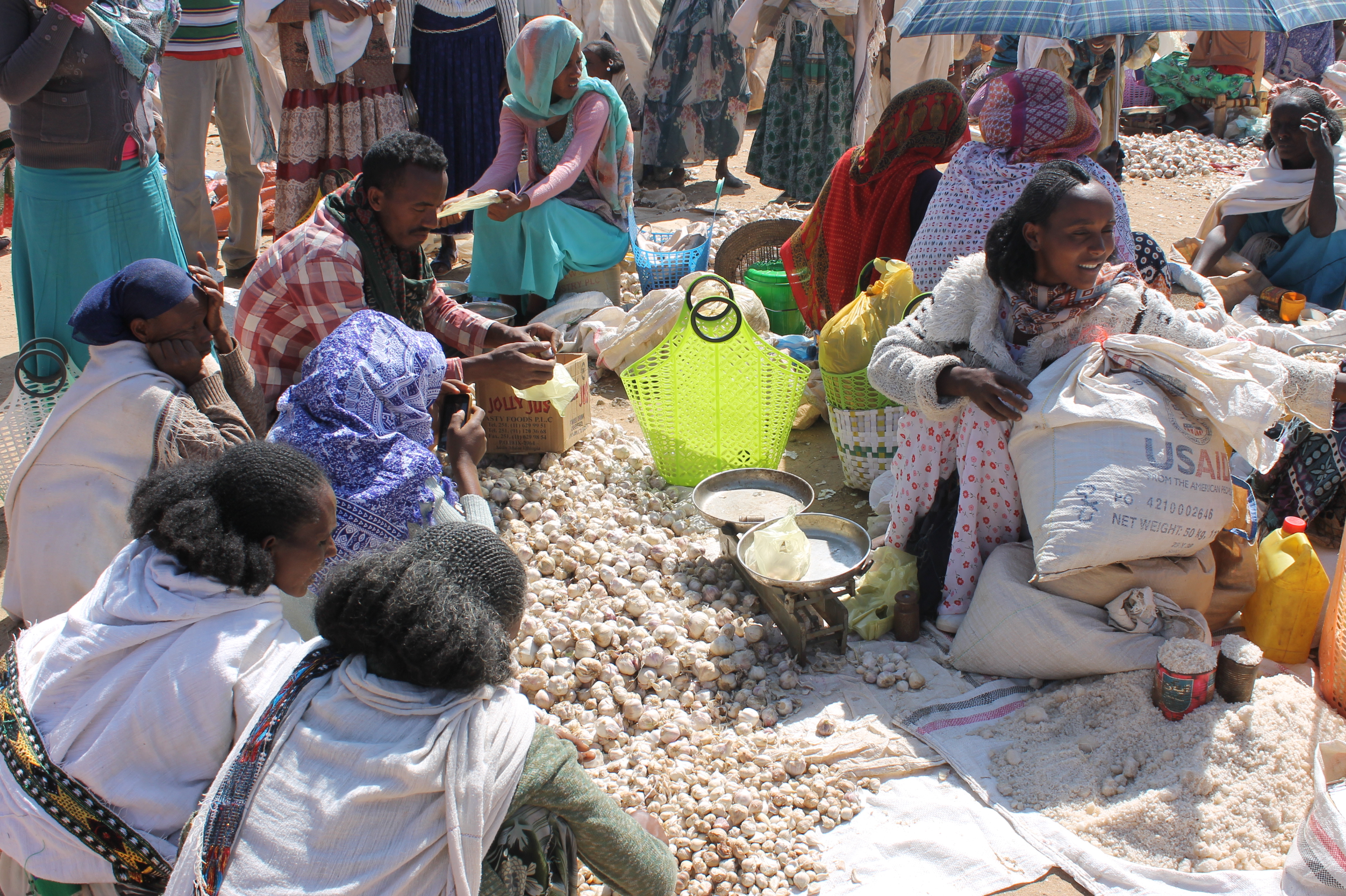
Women selling garlic at Hawzien's weekly market (2017)

Based on the 2007 national census conducted by the Central Statistical Agency of Ethiopia (CSA), this woreda has a total population of 117,954, an increase of 26.42% over the 1994 census, of whom 56,415 are men and 61,539 women; 7,553 or 6.40% are urban inhabitants. With an area of 1,892.69 square kilometers, Hawzen has a population density of 62.32, which is greater than the Zone average of 56.93 persons per square kilometer. A total of 25,067 households were counted in this woreda, resulting in an average of 4.71 persons to a household, and 24,105 housing units. The majority of the inhabitants said they practiced Ethiopian Orthodox Christianity, with 99.4% reporting that as their religion.

The 1994 national census reported a total population for this woreda of 93,300 of whom 45,704 were men and 47,596 were women; 3,835 or 4.11% of its population were urban dwellers. The largest ethnic group reported in Hawzen was the Tigrayan (99.68%). Tigrinya is spoken as a first language by 99.72%. The majority of the inhabitants practiced Ethiopian Orthodox Christianity, with 99.45% reporting that as their religion. Concerning education, 11.38% of the population were considered literate, which is greater than the Zone average of 9.01%; 11.71% of children aged 7–12 were in primary school; a negligible number of the children aged 13–14 were in junior secondary school, as well as the inhabitants aged 15–18 in senior secondary school. Concerning sanitary conditions, about 76% of the urban houses and 18% of all houses had access to safe drinking water at the time of the census; about 7% of the urban and about 3.5% of the total had toilet facilities.

== Agriculture ==
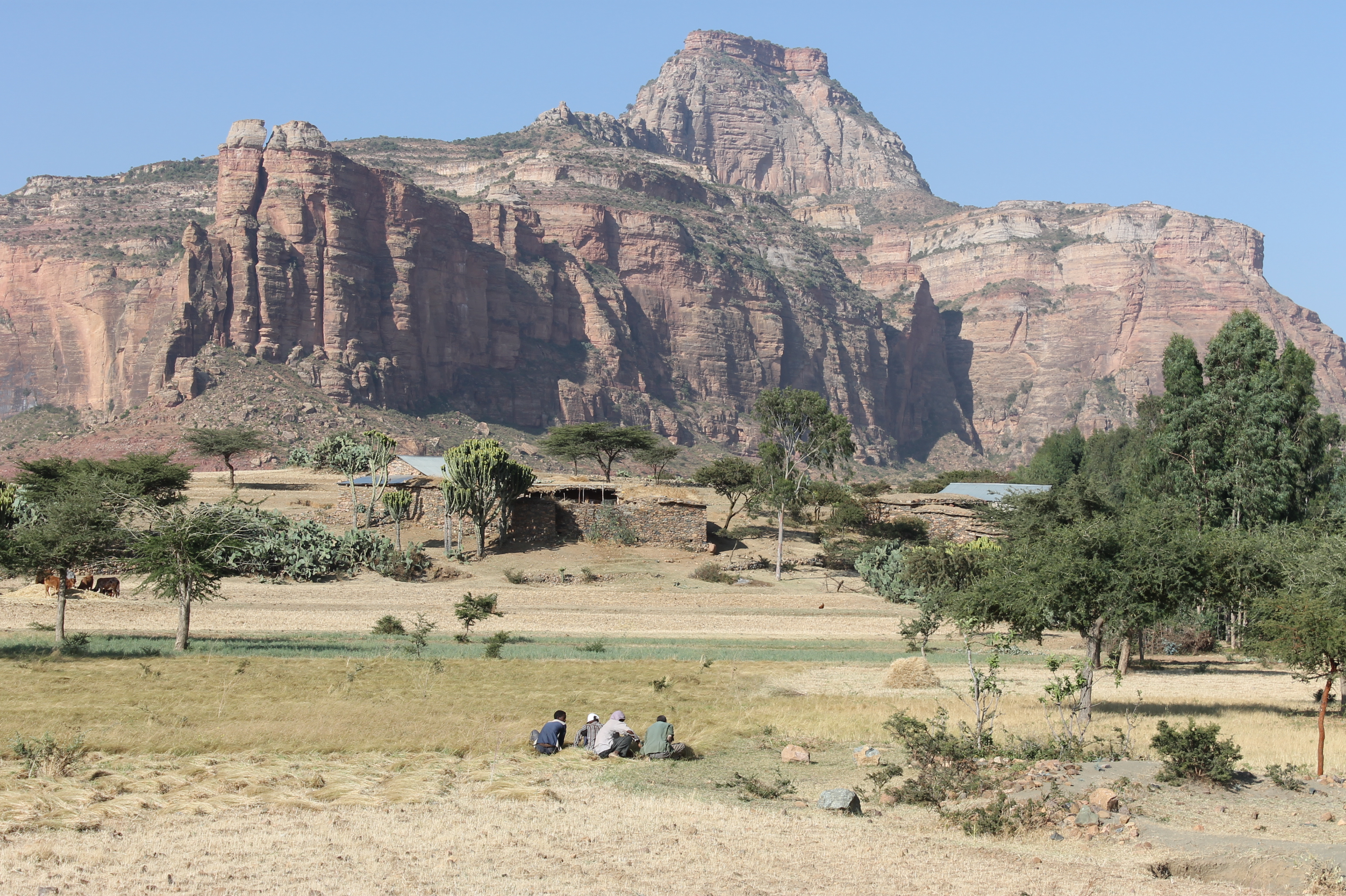
Men harvesting tef in front of Megab escarpment (2017)

A sample enumeration performed by the CSA in 2001 interviewed 21,582 farmers in this woreda, who held an average of 0.77 hectares of land. Of the 16,580 hectares of private land surveyed, 77.92% was under cultivation, 12.64% pasture, 5.1% fallow, 0.78% in woodland, and 4.03% was devoted to other uses. For the land under cultivation in this woreda, 62% was planted in cereals, 13.2% in pulses, 0.96% in oilseeds, and 7 hectares in vegetables. The total area planted in fruit trees was 372 hectares, while 13 were planted in gesho. 74.00% of the farmers both raised crops and livestock, while 22.35% only grew crops and 3.65% only raised livestock. Land tenure in this woreda is distributed amongst 95.49% owning their land, 3.37% renting, and 1.02% holding their land under other forms of tenure.
