= Battle of Agordat (1941) =

British WWII victory over Italy in Eritrea

- Part of The East African campaign
- British invasion of Eritrea, 1941
| Date | 26–31 January 1941 |
| Location | Agordat, Eritrea Governorate, Italian East Africa 15°32′55″N 37°53′12″E |
| Result | British victory |

Belligerents
| United Kingdom: India; Sudan | Italy: Italian East Africa |

Commanders and leaders
| Archibald Wavell; William Platt; Noel Beresford-Peirse | Duke of Aosta; Orlando Lorenzini |

Units involved
| Gazelle Force; 4th Indian Division; 5th Indian Division (less one brigade) | 2nd Colonial Division |

Strength
| 2 infantry divisions Sudan Defence Force (elements) | 6,000–7,000 men |

Casualties and losses
| | 1,500–2,000 prisoners 14 tanks 43 guns |
- Agordat in the Gash-Barka region, Eritrea. Capital of the former Barka province, between the modern Gash-Barka and Anseba.

The Battle of Agordat was fought near Agordat in Eritrea from 26 to 31 January 1941, by the Italian army and Royal Corps of Colonial Troops against British, Commonwealth and Indian forces, during the East African Campaign of the Second World War. The British had the advantage of breaking Italian codes and cyphers before the offensive and received copious amounts of information from Italian sources on the order of battle and plans of the Regia Aeronautica (Italian Royal Air Force) and the Italian army.

After the garrison of Italian and colonial troops at Kassala in Sudan was ordered to withdraw in mid-January, the British offensive into Eritrea due in February 1941 began in mid-January instead. Agordat was an excellent defensive position and the British advance was slowed by delaying actions and mined roads but the attack began on 28 January on the left (northern) flank, which was repulsed. Determined fighting took place on the hills and plain below until 31 January, when the British attacked behind four Matilda tanks and Bren Gun Carriers, which easily destroyed the Italian Fiat M11/39 tanks and forced the infantry to retreat.

To avoid being cut off the Italians began a disorderly retreat to Keren, leaving behind 1,000 prisoners, several guns and 14 knocked out tanks; another 1,000 men were taken during the British pursuit. The Battle of Agordat saw some of the most determined and effective defensive operations of the war by the Italian and local forces. The battle was the first big victory in the British offensive against Italian East Africa and was followed by the Battle of Keren (5 February – 1 April), which led to the fall of the Eritrea Governorate.

== Background ==
=== Italian offensive in 1940 ===
After weeks of inactivity by the Italian forces after the declaration of war, Amedeo, Duke of Aosta the Viceroy and Governor-General of Italian East Africa (Africa Orientale Italiana [AOI]), commander in chief of Comando Forze Armate dell'Africa Orientale Italiana (Italian East African Armed Forces Command) and Generale d'Armata Aerea (General of the Air Force) ordered a limited offensive to seize a number of Sudanese settlements on the border with the AOI, including Kassala. The Italians were interested in acquiring Kassala to strengthen their frontier defences and as a potential starting point for an invasion of Sudan.

It was also hoped that taking Kassala would boost morale among Italian troops and impress the local population. The rainy season was approaching, and once it began offensive operations would be impossible until the end of September, due to the lack of paved roads, leaving little time for the Italians to act. A force was assembled near the Sudan border to capture Kassala. The British were aware of its presence and had considered an attack to forestall the Italians but this was prevented by poor wireless communication.

Advancing on Kassala were two colonial infantry brigades, four squadrons of cavalry, approximately 24 armoured vehicles (a mix of light tanks, medium tanks and armoured cars) and ten batteries of artillery. Many of the troops being Askari in Italian service. Starting from Teseney (an Eritrean town to the south-east of Kassala) the Italian force was divided into three columns, one approaching Kassala from the east (consisting mainly of cavalry) while the other two advanced on either side of the Gash River.

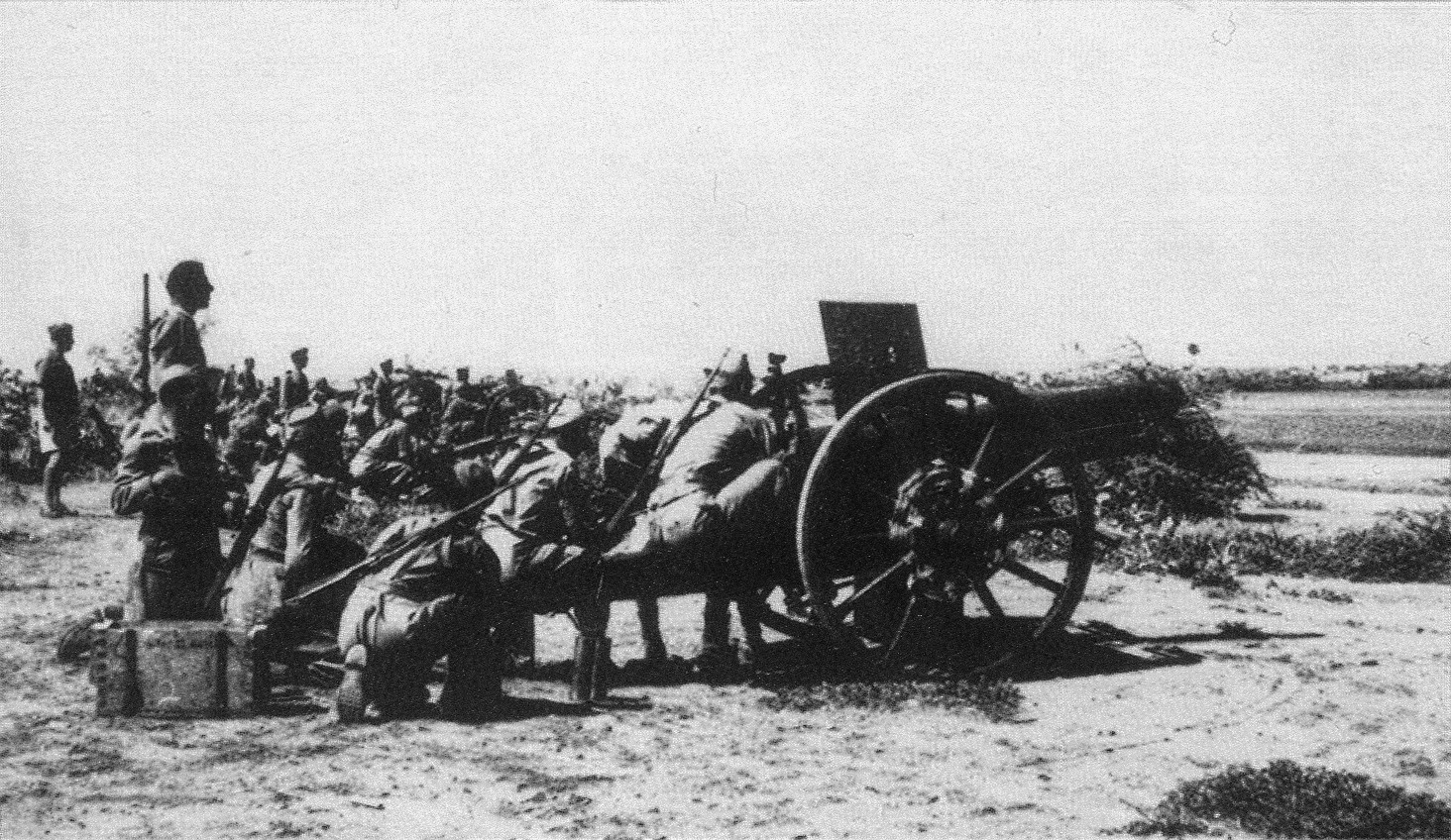
Italian artillery firing on Kassala.

The British commander in Sudan, General William Platt, commanded 7,000 troops, consisting of the 4,500 men of the Sudan Defence Force (SDF) and three British regular battalions. General Wavell, Middle East Command, whose priority was the defence of Egypt and Sudan had to wait for reinforcements. Kassala had a garrison of around 500 men of the SDF and the local police, consisting of two motorised infantry companies and a mounted infantry company, with no artillery or armoured vehicles. The action began with an air raid by the Regia Aeronautica, then at 06:30 hours, Italian cavalry arrived and engaged the defenders outside of the town. The SDF, in lorries with machine guns, carried out hit-and-run attacks on the flanks and rear of the Italian columns. Despite being outnumbered, the SDF and police put up a spirited defence that inflicted significantly more casualties on the attackers than they suffered themselves. After an action Pitt described as "brisk but short-lived", the defenders withdrew from Kassala and rallied at the next stop on the railway line, Butana Bridge.

At Kassala, the 12th Colonial Brigade built anti-tank defences, machine-gun posts and strongpoints. The Italians were disappointed to find no strong anti-British sentiment among the Sudanese population. During the Italian attack at Kassala a battalion of Italian colonial troops and a banda (pl. irregulars) attacked Gallabat and forced No. 3 Company, Eastern Arab Corps to retire. Karora was occupied unopposed when the Sudanese police were ordered to withdraw and at Kurmuk on 7 July, another colonial battalion and a bande supported by artillery and aircraft, overcame a force of 60 Sudanese police after a short engagement.

The Italian attacks had gained a valuable entrepôt to the Sudanese hinterland at Kassala, had made it more difficult for the British to support the indigenous resistance in Gojjam by capturing Gallabat; the loss of Kurmuk prompted some of the locals to resort to banditry. Local Sudanese opinion was impressed by the Italian successes but the population of Kassala continued to support the British and supplied valuable information during the occupation. The SDF continued to operate close to Kassala and on 5 July, a company of the 2nd Battalion, West Yorkshire Regiment arrived at Gedaref to act as a reserve for the SDF. The British discovered that rumours of the arrival of the West Yorkshire company had reached the Italians in greatly magnified form and Platt decided to bluff the Italians into believing that there were far greater forces on the Sudanese border. An Italian map captured on 25 July showed around 20,000 British and Sudanese troops in Kassala province. The 5th Indian Infantry Division was ordered to Port Sudan on 2 August.

=== Italian plans ===
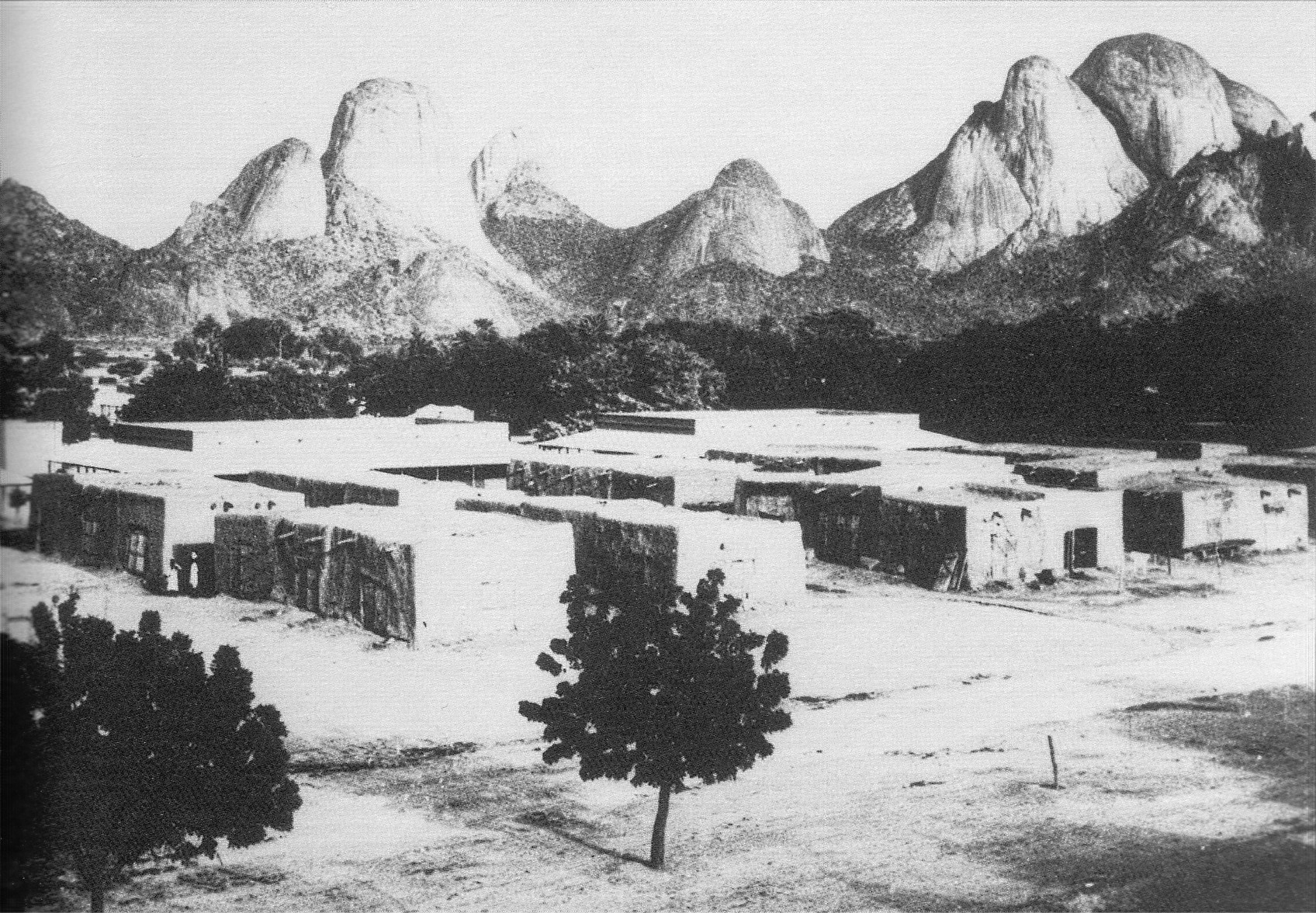
Kassala in 1940

After the conquest of British Somaliland, the Italians in the AOI adopted a more defensive posture. In late 1940, Italian forces had suffered defeats in the Mediterranean, the Western Desert, the Battle of Britain and in the Greco-Italian War. General Ugo Cavallero, the new Italian Chief of the General Staff in Rome, adopted a new strategy in East Africa. In December 1940, Cavallero ordered the Italian forces in East Africa to concentrate on the defence of the AOI by withdrawing to better defensive positions. On 31 December, Frusci ordered a retirement from the area north of Kassala along the track east of Sabdaret with outposts at Serobatib and Adaret, with a mobile force at Sabdaret as a reserve.

Earlier in the month, Frusci had received orders from Rome to cancel plans to invade Sudan, withdraw from Kassala and Metemma in the lowlands along the Sudan–Eritrea border and hold the more easily defended mountain passes on the Kassala–Agordat and Metemma–Gondar roads. Frusci was reluctant to withdraw from the lowlands, because it would be a propaganda defeat after he had announced that the British were about to attack and would be defeated. Kassala was also an important railway junction; holding it prevented the British from using the railway to carry supplies from Port Sudan on the Red Sea coast to the base at Gedaref.

=== British plans ===
In October 1940, the British formed Gazelle Force, a mobile brigade that combined SDF and Indian troops in lorries, supported by a battery of British field artillery, which launched raids against Italian advanced posts around Kassala on the Ethiopian plateau, where hill ranges from 2,000–3,000 ft (610–910 m) bound wide valleys and the rainfall makes the area malarial from July to October. After a British reverse at Gallabat in November, Wavell held a review of the situation in Cairo from 1 to 2 December. With Compass imminent in Egypt, the British forces in East Africa were to provide help to the Patriots in Ethiopia and continue to pressure the Italians at Gallabat. Kassala was to be recaptured early in January 1941, to prevent an Italian advance deeper into Sudan and the 4th Indian Infantry Division (Major-General Noel Beresford-Peirse) was to be transferred from Egypt to Sudan from the end of December. With the success of Compass, East Africa was made second in importance after Egypt, a strategy in which victory over the Italian forces in Ethiopia was to be achieved by April 1941.

The transfer of the 4th Indian Division took until early January 1941. Platt intended to begin the offensive on the northern front on 8 February, with a pincer attack on Kassala, by the 4th Indian Infantry Division and 5th Indian Infantry Division (Major-General Lewis Heath), less a brigade each. News of the Italian disaster in Egypt, the harassment by Gazelle Force and the activities of Mission 101 in Ethiopia, led to the Italians withdrawing their northern flank to Keru and Wachai and then on 18 January to retreat hurriedly from Kassala, Tessenei and the triangle of Keru, Biscia and Aicota. Wavell ordered Platt to begin the March offensive early on 9 February and to begin on 19 January, when it seemed that Italian morale was crumbling. Wireless decrypts greatly aided British preparations and the decision to attack ahead of schedule. The Italian withdrawal led Wavell to order a pursuit and the troops arriving at Port Sudan (Briggs Force) to attack at Karora and advance parallel to the coast, to meet the forces coming from the west.

==== Ultra ====
The Italians in the AOI had replaced their ciphers by November 1940 but by the end of the month, the Government Code and Cypher School (GC&CS) in England and the Cipher Bureau Middle East (CBME) in Cairo had broken the Regio Esercito and Regia Aeronautica replacement codes. Sufficient low-grade ciphers had also been broken to reveal the Italian order of battle and the supply situation by the time that the British offensive began on 19 January 1941. Italian dependence on wireless communication, using frequencies on which it was easy for the British to eavesdrop, led to a flood of information from the daily report from the Viceroy, to the operational plans of the Regia Aeronautica and Regia Esercito. On occasion, British commanders had messages before the recipients and it was reported later by the Deputy Director Military Intelligence in Cairo, that

...he could not believe that any army commander in the field had [ever] been better served by his intelligence.

— DDMI (ME)

== Prelude ==
=== Italian retirement ===
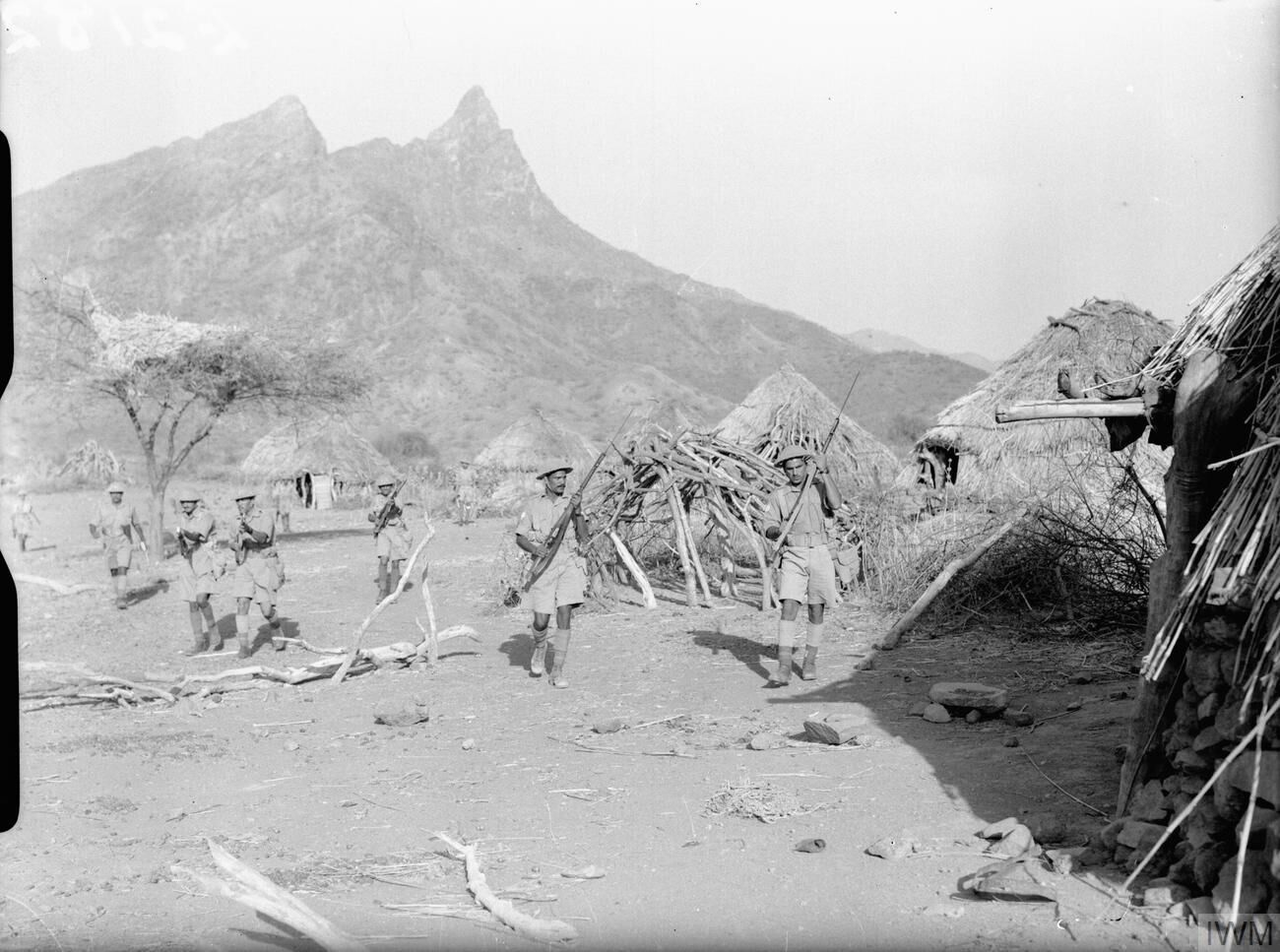
Indian troops clearing a village in Eritrea, 1941.

The situation in late 1940 rendered the Sudanese towns of Kassala and Gallabat untenable, leading to the decision by Italian command to abandon them and withdraw the troops to Ethiopia and Eritrea. The Italian 12th Colonial Brigade (General Orlando Lorenzini) at Kassala retired on the night of 17/18 January 1941, which to the British suggested that the situation in Egypt was affecting Italian strategy in East Africa and that a bolder British policy was justified. The British offensive from Sudan due on 9 February was brought forward to 19 January and Platt was ordered to mount a vigorous pursuit.

While the garrison of Gallabat was ordered to reach Gondar, the 12th Colonial Brigade retired towards the foothills of the Eritrean highlands. Its retreat was pursued and harassed by Gazelle Force, which scouted ahead of 4th Indian Infantry Division and flanked pockets of resistance. The 4th Indian Division was sent 40 mi (64 km) along the road to Sabderat and Wachai, thence as far towards Keru as supplies allowed, with the Matilda Infantry tanks of B Squadron, 4th RTR to join from Egypt. The 5th Indian Division was to capture Aicota, ready to move east to Barentu or north-east to Biscia.

During the advance from Kassala to Agordat, Gazelle Force fought a brief battle with the Italian 41st Colonial Brigade near the village of Keru on 21–22 January 1941, where they found themselves being charged by Askari cavalry. Once the surprise of facing a horseback charge in the 1940s passed, Gazelle Force troops opened fire with field guns, rifles and machine-guns. Pitt wrote, "within ten minutes it was all over, dead and wounded men and beasts strewn about, dust clouds covering the survivors as they galloped frantically for the shelter of the scrub from which they had so dramatically appeared". Stubborn fighting followed as 4/11th Sikhs (later relieved by the 2nd battalion Queen's Own Cameron Highlanders) engaged Italian troops on high ground. The Italians retreated during the night, abandoning to the British, "a formidable defensive position", after finding themselves outflanked and under attack from the rear by troops from the Highland Light Infantry. During the withdrawal of the 41st Colonial Brigade, 800 of its troops were taken prisoner, including the Brigade commander and his staff.

=== Agordat ===
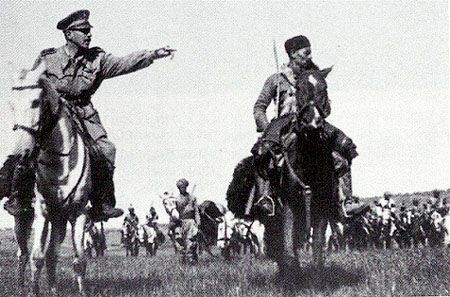
Lieutenant Amedeo Guillet with a Libyan Spahi and his cavalry.

The ground at Agordat was a natural defensive position and the defences mostly blocked an advance from the south-west from Biscia and Barentu; the northern flank was barred by the bed of the Baraka river. Two roads from Kassala ran to Agordat, a track to the north through Keru and Biscia, where the road improved and the Via Imperiale, a tarmac road through Tessenei, Aicota and Barentu. The roads joined at Agordat and went through Keren, the only route to Asmara. Agordat was a small town on the north bank of the Baraka river, a dry strand except in the rainy season, with palm groves along the banks. To the south-west of Agordat, was the Laquetat ridge, defended by a fort at each end, wire entanglements and a concrete wall. To the south-east, the Italians had built fortifications on four rocky outcrops and beyond was Mount Cochen, with a peak about 2,000 ft (610 m) above the plain.

To the north and east the foothills were closer together and the Barentu road ran south between Laquetat and Mt Cochen. By 25 January, the Allied forces had cut the line of communication between Agordat and Barentu. On the following day, the 4th Indian Division (5th Indian Infantry Brigade and 11th Indian Infantry Brigade) artillery bombarded the Italian defences, while South African Air Force (SAAF) Hurricane fighters destroyed most of the fifty Italian aircraft in Asmara and Gura, achieving air supremacy for the rest of the campaign. By 27 January, most of the two Indian divisions were close to Agordat and a brigade turned south, to move across country towards Barentu. Gazelle Force scouted and probed the Italian lines around Agordat to gauge their strength and gather intelligence.

== Battle ==
=== 28–30 January ===
On 28 January, The 4th Indian Division made an outflanking move north of Agordat towards Mount Itaberrè and Mount Caianac and Four Matilda I tanks of the 7th RTR arrived during the day. The 4th Battalion, Sikh Regiment and the 3/1st Battalion, 1st Punjab Regiment closed on Laquetat unopposed. The 3/14th Punjab made a cautious advance over the plain and reached the top of Mt Cochen just after dark. The 2nd Battalion, Queen's Own Cameron Highlanders and 1st Battalion (Wellesley's), 6th Rajputana Rifles followed up across the plain and by dark had dug in on the Italian flank. The 4th Sikh and 3/2st Punjab attacked Laquetat ridge during the night of 28/29 January but were repulsed and were transferred back to the plain, Gazelle Force taking over. Two Italian battalions had been sent to reinforce Mt Cochen during the night and the fighting continued all through 29 January. The 1st Battalion, (Wellesley's) moved up to the ridge but on 30 January, three more Italian battalions arrived and counter-attacked, throwing back the Indian infantry. A company from each of the Indian battalions had been detached because of insufficient mules and carried ammunition, water and food forward by hand, assisted by the Bengal Sappers and Miners. During the supply effort the carriers had to drop their loads and fix bayonets, to fill a gap in the line. The Italians also managed to get some pack artillery behind Mt Cochen, which forced the attackers to withdraw and reorganise the two Indian battalions which had become dispersed among the ridge and ravines. Three Indian battalions attacked again and forced the Italians back towards the Barentu road. In the plain, the 2nd Cameron eventually captured a spur known as Gibraltar and defeated several Italian counter-attacks during the afternoon.

=== 31 January ===
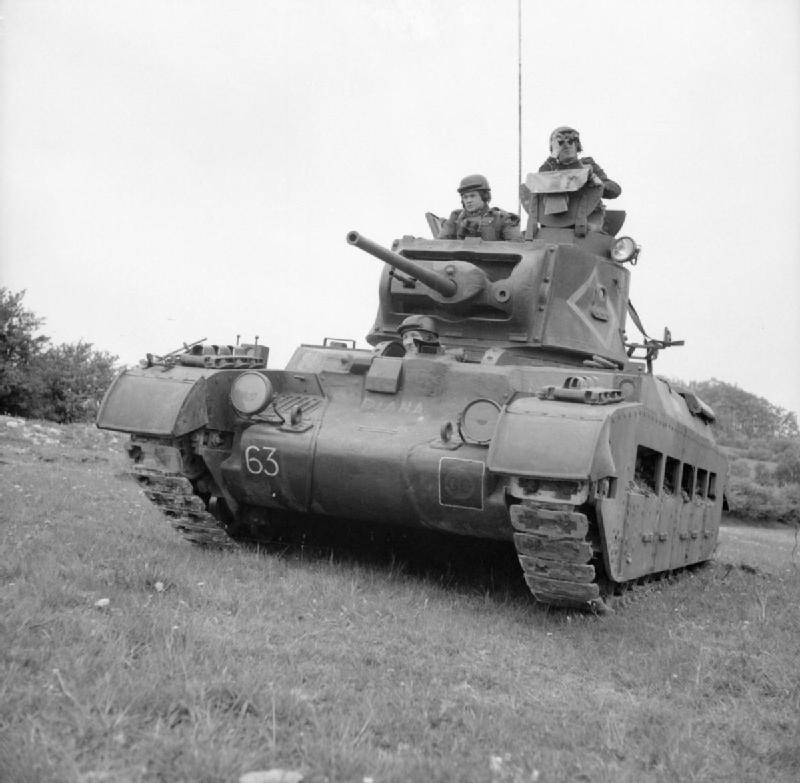
Example of a Matilda tank, photographed in England, 29 June 1941 (H10864)

The attack on Mount Laquatat and the pass between Mount Laquatat and Mount Cochen (where the defenders were commanded by Colonel Luziani) was renewed by the 1st Battalion, Royal Fusiliers behind the four Matildas, to break through the last obstacle before the Agordat plain. The final assault took place from 11:00 a.m. – 2:00 p.m. with the Anglo-Indian infantry preceded by Matilda tanks which crushed the Italian defences within a few minutes, overwhelmed the Italian artillery and destroyed eleven M11/39 tanks and Fiat L3 tankettes, some of which were crewed by German volunteers from ships in the port of Massawa.

Several counter-attacks by the Askari and the Amhara Cavalry in the open failed and the 3/1st Punjab passed through the Fusiliers to attack four fortified hills, known as Tinker, Tailor, Soldier and Sailor. Tinker and Tailor had been captured as night fell and the Punjabis dug in to face Italian counter-attacks but these did not occur. Apprehensive of being trapped if the Keren road was cut behind them, the defenders retreated in some confusion towards Keren, while the Indian and British infantry pursued towards Agordat. The British took 1,000 prisoners along with 14 damaged tanks, 43 guns and all the heavy equipment. Agordat was occupied on 1 February. During the advance to Keren, another 1,000 prisoners were taken. Gazelle Force, which was leading the pursuit and reluctant to halt to take prisoners, drove past mobs of Italian soldiers attempting to surrender, leaving them for other British units to deal with.

=== Barentu ===
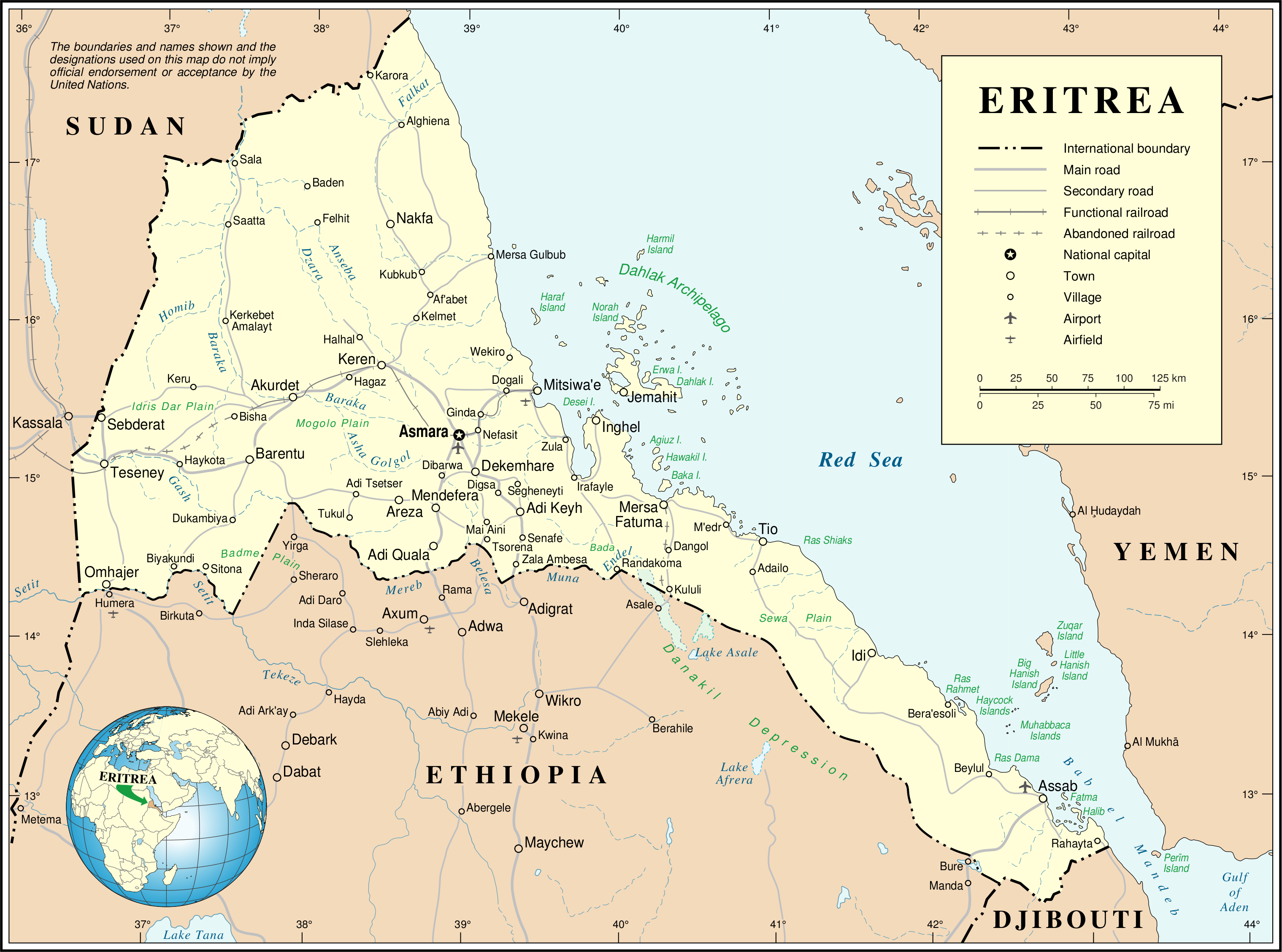
United Nations map of Eritrea

Barentu was a fortified town with an airfield, in a plain ringed with steep hills, about 28 mi (45 km) from a gold mine at Guala. The town was garrisoned by the 2nd Colonial Division (General Angelo Bergonzi) with nine infantry battalions (8,000 men) 36 tanks and armoured cars and 32 mountain guns in three defence lines. On 21 January, the 29th Indian Infantry Brigade advanced from Aicota (now Haykota) and was opposed by an Italian Colonial brigade on the Barentu road, until the defenders were outflanked by the 6th Battalion, 13th Frontier Force Rifles (6th FFR).

On the evening of 25 January another rearguard was encountered; an attack before dawn was repulsed after the 3rd Battalion, 2nd Punjab Regiment captured its objective but the 1st Battalion, Worcestershire Regiment got lost in the dark, leaving the flank of the 6th FFR uncovered and the defenders counter-attacked. Another effort on 26 January made some progress and the Italians retired during the night. On 28 January, the Indians attacked another blocking position and forced the Italians back to a position 6 mi (9.7 km) from Barentu, where the defenders resisted for three days.

The 10th Indian Infantry Brigade, advancing south from Agordat, found that rock and huge boulders on the slopes above the road had been dynamited to block the road. The defenders fought another determined rearguard action as the Indian engineers cleared the obstructions. On 31 January, the 1st Worcester captured rises to the west, despite stifling heat, thirst, moving through thorn bushes which tore clothing and slashed skin, over dry crumbly soil. The Italians were forced out of two lines of defence but had prepared for this and surveyed their positions to bring mortar and machine-gun fire on them, forcing back the 1st Worcester and nearby Indian troops.

A SDF machine-gun company found a track and was able to outflank the defenders and attack from the east. As news spread of the fall of Agordat, the garrison withdrew along tracks towards Adi Ugri and along the Asmara–Adua road on the night of 1/2 February, leaving behind about two battalions' worth of men to be taken prisoner, along with their guns and several medium and light tanks. The first British and Indian troops into Barentu found hot food in the Italian field kitchens. The retreat of the remains of the 2nd Colonial Division was pursued by 2 Motor-Machine-Gun Group and by 8 February, the Italians had abandoned their vehicles and dispersed into the hills.

== Aftermath ==
=== Analysis ===
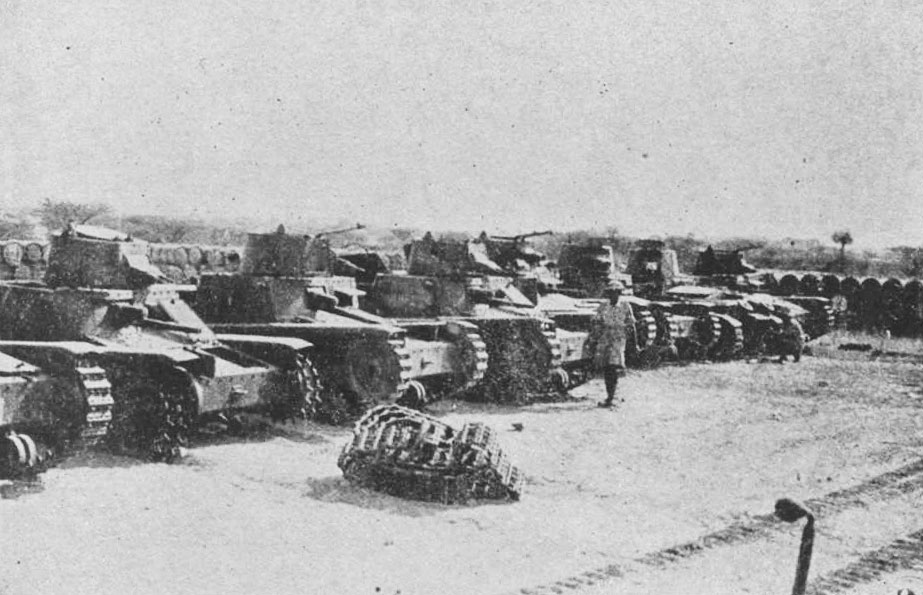
Italian M11/39 tanks captured after the battle of Agordat

In two weeks the British had advanced 130 mi (210 km), fought four actions, taken 6,000 prisoners and 80 guns, 26 tanks and 400 lorries. A message from the Duke of Aosta was found in which ordered Agordat and Barentu to be defended to the last man, because the terrain would nullify British superiority in tanks and wheeled vehicles. The defenders had retreated instead and the British realised that the rest of the Italian force in Eritrea was still well-equipped, when 300 rifles, thousands of rounds of ammunition and hand grenades were recovered. The Italian and colonial defenders of Agordat had fought a determined defence but Lorenzini had kept the 42nd Brigade south of the Baraka (Barka River) and neglected the opportunity to send it to counter-attack around the northern flank of the attackers.

The British forces had been forced to stop their pursuit on the Barka, where the only bridge had been blown and Land mines laid in the river bed. The Italian retreats had been fairly well organised and though the British followed up as swiftly as possible, they lacked mobility; air support from the RAF was limited by the distance of their airfields from the front line. The airfields of the Regia Aeronautica at Sabderat and Tessenei were taken over as soon as possible and air attacks made on Italian marching columns, the railway and the remaining Italian airfields in Eritrea. From mid-January to mid-February, the Regia Aeronautica lost 61 aircraft, 50 in combat or on the ground. After the delaying action at Agordat, the 4th Colonial Division had time to retreat along a path to the north, sowing mines and demolitions as it went. On 3 February, Wavell ordered Platt to capture Keren and Asmara.

=== Casualties ===
During the battle and retirement from Agordat, 1,500 to 2,000 Italian and local troops were taken prisoner. From Agordat, Barentù and the retreat to Keren, Italian and colonial forces suffered casualties of 179 officers, 130 non-commissioned officers (NCOs), 1,230 Italian and 14,686 Askari other ranks; a total of 15,916 soldiers. The Italians lost 96 guns, 231 machine guns, 329 automatic rifles, 4,331 draught animals, 387 vehicles, 36 M11/39 tanks and L3 tankettes. In 1988, Alberto Rovighi recorded Italian losses as 179 officers, 130 NCOs, 1,230 Italian soldiers, 14,686 Askari killed, wounded or taken prisoner along with 4,331 pack animals, 329 light machine-guns, 231 machine-guns, 96 artillery pieces, 141 trucks, 7 motorcycles, 15 carri (armoured vehicle) L3/33 and 9 carri Fiat M11/39. In 2014 Angelo Del Boca wrote that 1,289 Italian troops were killed around Gondar from June 1940 to the end of the campaign, 407 of the casualties being suffered in November 1941.

== See also ==
- List of British military equipment of World War II
- List of Italian Army equipment in World War II
