= Vogra massacre =

1937 Vogra Massacre
- Location: Village of Vogra, Ethiopia
- Date: 1937
- Attack type: Mass shooting, Hanging
- Deaths: 67
- Perpetrator: Royal Italian Army
- Motive: Collective punishment of an entire village because of the fleeing of 2 inmates

The 1937 Vogra Massacre was committed by the Italian fascist regime in Vogra, a village in occupied Ethiopia.

== Background ==
The Italian army occupied Ethiopia under the leadership of Benito Mussolini in the year 1936 following the Second Italo-Ethiopian War.

== Massacre ==
The villagers' lives remained unchanged during the first year of the occupation. However, the situation turned perilous once the Italians erected a military post near the village. The Italians had local collaborators but also many opponents who wanted to drive them out of their previously independent land. Leading the resistance in the area was Amorho Obenach. To capture him, the Italians began arresting more villagers and people from surrounding areas. An Ethiopian collaborator lured many men to the military post with promises of financial support, but once they arrived, they were arrested. After two prisoners escaped from captivity, the camp commander decided to punish the villagers. "He executed all the prisoners, some by shooting and others by hanging, about 67 people, including 33 Jews," a survivor recounted. Following the execution, Italian soldiers entered the village and burned it down along with everyone inside.

== See also ==
- Jews outside Europe under Axis occupation
