= Gaia Zeret massacre =

1936 massacre in Ethiopia

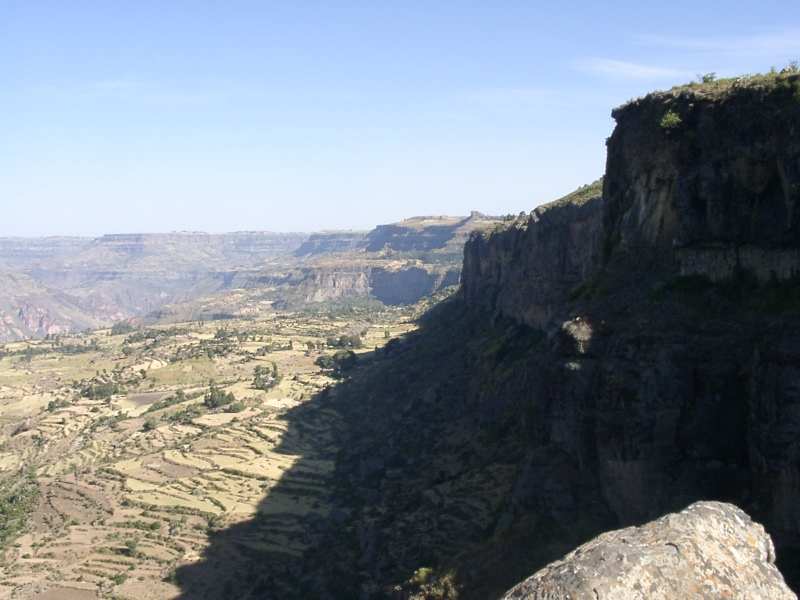
- The mountains of northern Shewa
- Location: Ametsegna Washa, Ethiopia
- Date: April 9-11, 1939
- Target: Ethiopian rebels and their families
- Victims: 800-3,000
- Perpetrators: Italian colonial troops (IV, XX and XXXIV Battalions) under the command of Colonel Orlando Lorenzini

The Gaia Zeret massacre refers to the massacre that took place in Italian East Africa near the Grotta del Ribelle (or Gaia Zeret, in Amharic: Ametsegna Washa) near Debre Berhan, in Shewa province, between April 9 and April 11, 1939. The action was conducted by Italian colonial troops and Alpini under the command of Colonel Orlando Lorenzini and Lieutenant Colonel Gennaro Sora, then in charge of hunting down the forces of the Arbegnoch rebels of Abebe Aregai, by order of General Ugo Cavallero while Amedeo di Savoia was Viceroy of Ethiopia. Reports on the number of victims range from 800 to over 5,500 people, including women and children.

== History ==
=== Italian operations around Shewa ===
Between February and April 1939, major actions against the resistance took place northeast of Addis Abeba in the Menz and Merhabete region, with the aim of arresting or neutralizing Abebe Aragai. This was preceded by a meeting between Ugo Cavallero and Colonel Orlando Lorenzini on February 21, 1939, in which it was agreed not to waste unnecessary time on reprisals in order not to waste unnecessary time in the hunt for Aregai, which, however, was not always adhered to.

The first clashes with the Ethiopian rebels occurred on February 23 and 25. The number of deaths alone, 97 on the Ethiopian side and 24 Askari on the Italian side, shows that there were military-organized operations behind these operations, which were described as police actions. At another meeting in Addis Abeba between Cavallero and Lorenzini on March 7, a major operation around Debre Berhan was decided upon. An attack on the rebel group of around 2,000–3,000 men led by Aragai on March 14 resulted in 311 deaths, according to official Italian figures. According to Italian sources, these were supply units. However, it is likely that the rear guard of Aragai's troops was hit, which, as experience shows, consisted of family members of the resistance fighters and refugees. In the following days, further "raids" were carried out, with the air force also being used due to the impassable terrain. On the advice of the commander-in-chief of the Italian Air Force in Italian East Africa, General Gennaro Tedeschini Lalli, the Air Force did not limit itself to dropping conventional explosive bombs, but also dropped bombs filled with mustard gas on suspected rebel hideouts. The poison gas attacks not only killed resistance fighters, but also women and children, but also accidentally hit their own troops.

Benito Mussolini himself congratulated the action in Shewa and ordered the complete suppression of the uprising. Once suppressed, the rebellion in Amhara should then be addressed. By the end of March, over 1,000 Ethiopians had been killed, while two officers, four soldiers and 47 Askari had been killed on the Italian side. According to official reports, mass executions were avoided in order to promote pacification. In reality, however, attacks on the civilian population, looting and arson were commonplace. When Orlando Lorenzini took over command of the northeast Shewa region on April 1, the reprisals increased in both number and severity. In this second phase, no consideration was given to the civilian population.

=== Siege of Gaia Zeret ===
On March 30, Italian reconnaissance aircraft spotted a large group of rebels in northern Shewa. Defined by the Italians as supply units of Abebe Aragai, they were mostly wounded, elderly, women and children, who were accompanied by a few armed rebels under the leadership of Tesciommè Sciangut (also Tashoma Shankut). To avoid further pursuit, the group retreated into a cave system in the Gaia Zeret region, southwest of the town of Mehal Meda in the Menz Lalo Midir woreda. The group believed themselves to be safe in the Zeret cave, also known in Ethiopia as Amesegna Washa, because the narrow access path to the cave entrance, located in a rock face on the edge of a high plateau, was easy to monitor and defend. The approximately 40-metre-wide (130 ft) cave entrance was located under an approximately 50-metre-high (160 ft) overhanging rock wall at an altitude of about 3 kilometres (1.9 mi) and was additionally protected by a dry stone wall.

Orlando Lorenzini, meanwhile, had ordered his ground troops to pursue, track down and encircle the group. After the hiding place had been identified and after several days of siege there had been no progress, artillery support was requested. Two 65mm mountain guns, disassembled on pack animals, were brought in and placed in position. The ensuing bombardment partially collapsed the dry stone wall, while other artillery shells exploded inside the cave. At night the access path was bombarded by machine guns to seal off the only escape route from the cave.

A request by Lorenzini to the Italian High Command for flamethrowers was rejected on April 3. The local commander, Lieutenant Colonel Gennaro Sora, an Alpini officer who had received multiple awards in World War I and who had been involved in the rescue operation for the survivors of the crash of the airship Italia in 1928 and had been declared a national hero by Mussolini, had previously reported that the rebels trapped in the cave, who had sufficient water and supplies, could only be dealt with using flamethrowers. The idea of blowing up the cave entrance and burying the rebels alive in the cave was also dropped.

The attempt to succeed through negotiations in which it was promised that the women and children would be allowed to leave if the rebels surrendered without resistance also failed. On the night of April 5, the resistance fighters tried in vain to lure the Italian besiegers away from the cave with a diversionary maneuver.

In the following days, the Italians attacked the Ethiopians entrenched in the cave several times, but were unable to force a decision. Rather, they had to accept losses like the besieged, who threw corpses out of the cave. Trapped civilians who tried to escape from the cave were taken prisoner, taken to the edge of the cliff and mowed down by machine gunfire. An attempt by the rebels to break out on April 7 failed under Italian fire.

=== Use of poison gas and executions ===
In order to force a decision, Gennaro Sora requested the support of the chemical weapons troops. A ten-man chemical weapons platoon from the Granatieri di Savoia division then set out from Massawa towards Debre Berhan, carrying 100 65/17 arsenic (filled artillery shells and a C.500.T aerial bomb filled with 212 kg; 467 lb of mustard gas).

Before the last stretch of the journey via Debre Berhan to Gaia Zeret, which was reached two days later on April 8, the mustard gas was transferred into twelve smaller barrels. On the way there, one of the barrels filled with mustard gas had to be abandoned after the container began to leak. An Italian non-commissioned officer suffered chemical burns that had to be treated.

According to Pioselli, the complicated plan shows a certain lack of planning in the use of poison gas. It was clear what effects the poison gas could have, but there was no clear idea of what the goals were to be achieved with its use. The irritant gas arsenic was intended to cause the Ethiopians to leave the cave and the mustard gas, according to Boaglio, was intended to contaminate the access route so that escape was impossible. However, there was no doubt that the mustard gas released at the level of the cave entrance was also intended to have an effect in the cave.

After the plan had been carried out on the morning of April 9, little was happening in front of the Italians' eyes. However, dramatic scenes must have taken place in the cave, as Ethiopian eyewitness reports show. According to the reports, shortness of breath, feelings of suffocation, burning eyes and blindness drove some of them mad, so that they attacked and killed each other. Others simply fell to the ground and died. No one bothered to count the victims, so the number of victims of the use of poison gas is unknown.

Nevertheless, there were still no signs that anyone would surrender. Supported by a mock attack by another rebel group on the night of April 10, Tesciommè Sciangut and 15 other rebels managed to break out despite the Italian barrage. After another breakout attempt failed the following night, the survivors finally surrendered on the morning of April 11.

After the cave had been decontaminated, it was searched on April 13. In addition to numerous corpses and animal carcasses, 63 survivors were found, including 21 women and children. The 42 surviving men were also executed. Orlando Lorenzini reported to Addis Abeba on April 14 that he was considering blowing up the cave entrance, as the stench of corpses made a complete exploration of the extensive cave impossible. On April 15, the exploration was still not complete and in some areas some Ethiopians were still resisting, hiding behind piles of corpses. On the same day, Gennado Sora reported that 924 "bandits" had been killed and 360 prisoners, including women and children, had been taken since the start of the siege on April 3. Their own losses were given as 17 dead and 59 injured.

== Victims ==
However, the items found in the Grotta del Ribelle do not allow any statement to be made about the number of victims. Gashaw Ayferam Endaylalu speaks of over 5,500 victims who were killed in the gas attack and the subsequent mass executions in Gaia Zeret. His figure is based on the testimony of a survivor, but he admits that there are different reports about the number of victims and cites as an example the written memoirs of the leader of the resistance fighters holed up in the cave, Tesciommè Sciangut. The latter estimated that over 3,000 people fell victim to the Italian attack. Based on the number of granaries found in the cave and the amount of supplies stored in them, Matteo Dominioni assumes that the attack cost the lives of between 1,200 and 1,500 people in total. He also points out, however, that some older residents in the surrounding villages speak of 2,000 to 3,000 deaths. Documents found in the Italian archives show that 800 rebels were shot during the mass executions on 11 April. There are no details of the victims of the use of poison gas. At the end of the operation, Federica Saini Fasanotti reported to his superiors that 924 "bandits" (rebels) had been killed in the fighting in and outside the cave since the beginning of the operation, but does not state the number of civilian victims. The use of chemical weapons in Gaia Zeret does not find any claim of justification in the context of a reprisal action.

== Sources ==
=== Literature ===
- Endaylalu, Gashaw Ayferam (September 2018). "Mustard Gas Massacres and Atrocities Committed by Italy in 1939 Against the Inhabitant of Menz, Merhabete, and Jamma in Amesegna Washa/Zeret Cave" (PDF). Journal of Cultural and Religious Studies. 6 (9). doi:10.17265/2328-2177/2018.09.001 (inactive 1 July 2025).
- Dominioni, Matteo (2008). Lo sfascio dell'impero: gli italiani in Etiopia, 1936–1941 (in Italian). Laterza. ISBN 978-88-420-8533-1.
- Dominioni, Matteo (2006). "Etiopia 11 aprile 1939. La strage segreta di Zeret" (PDF). Italia Contemporanea (in Italian).
- Fasanotti, Federica Saini (December 1, 2010). Etiopia: 1936–1940: le operazioni di polizia coloniale nelle fonti dell'Esercito italiano (PDF) (in Italian). Stato Maggiore dell'Esercito.
- Boaglio, Alessandro (2010). Plotone chimico. Cronache abissine di una generazione scomoda (in Italian). Mimesis. ISBN 978-8857501567.
- Pioselli, Andrea (2012). "Zeret, Gennaro Sora e la memoria degli italiani" (PDF). Studi e ricerche di storia contemporanea (in Italian). 41.
