= Ano massacre =

2023 ethnic cleansing in Ethiopia

- Part of OLA insurgency
- Location: Ano, Seyo Woreda, East Welega Zone, Oromia, Ethiopia
- Date: February 2-4, 2023
- Target: Amhara civilians
- Deaths: 50+
- Injuries: 8
- Perpetrator: Oromo Liberation Army

Between February 2-4, 2023, militants from the Oromo Liberation Army (OLA) attacked an internally displaced person (IDP) camp in Ano, Oromia, Ethiopia, killing at least 50 people, mostly ethnic Amharas.

== Background ==
The ethnic Oromo Oromo Liberation Army (OLA-Shane) has waged an insurgency against the Ethiopian government for decades, particularly in Oromia and Oromo-inhabited areas of Amhara Region and other regions. In 2018, the political half of the Oromo Liberation Front split and became a political party recognized by the Ethiopian government, but in 2019 the OLA resumed attacks on the Ethiopian government and split from the OLF. In 2021, during the Tigray war, the OLA joined the Tigray Defense Forces in a joint offensive against the Ethiopian capital Addis Ababa, but were repelled.

In early 2022, violence in Oromia shifted from the west to West Shewa Zone, East Shewa Zone, and Horo Guduru Welega Zone. This was due to an OLA offensive in late 2022 seizing control of much of West Welega Zone, East Welega Zone, and Kelam Welega Zone in western Oromia. The fighting in early 2023 displaced at least 30,000 people into Amhara region. The city of Ano is located in Sayo Woreda, East Welega Zone, and is home to an IDP camp that houses over 10,800 displaced people.

== Massacre ==
The attack occurred at 6am on February 2, and lasted until February 4. The OLA militants were dressed in Ethiopian army uniforms, and entered Ano from three different directions. They began going house to house in the city and in the refugee camp and rounding up men. The area of the city that was targeted was the "Monday Market" neighborhood, where mixed Amhara and Oromo civilians lived, and the IDP camp. Civilians were targeted because of their Amhara identity. As soon as they entered the town, the OLA began shooting sporadically. An Ethiopian Human Rights Commission (EHRC) report said that 42 of the victims were displaced people, which the OLA deemed government supporters. Three children and three women were killed as well. The men targeted in the refugee camp were on the outskirts of the camp at the time, and had no ability to escape the attacks. An unnamed Oromia regional official and his driver were killed, along with a local policemen and pro-government militiamen. OLA militants burned the bodies of the men after killing them. Businesses, including a Commercial Bank of Ethiopia location, were targeted and destroyed. At least 50 people were killed and eight people were injured in the attack.

The Ethiopian government sent troops from Nekemte, and regained control of Ano on February 4. Eight young men suspected of collaborating with the OLA were killed by Ethiopian troops. Government forces located in Ano attempted to stop the attack, but were outnumbered. The OLA claimed responsibility for the attack, but said that they targeted "Amhara forces in training."
