= Ametsegna Washa =

Ethiopian cave, site of a massacre

Ametsegna Washa, also known as the "Cave of the Rebel" and "The Cave of Zeret", is a cavern located near the village of Zeret in Ethiopia. The cave was the location of the Massacre of Gaia Zeret, a massacre of 2500 Ethiopians in 1939 during the Second Italo-Ethiopian War.
