= Hawzen =

Place in Tigray Region, Ethiopia

Hawzen ሓውዜን
- Town
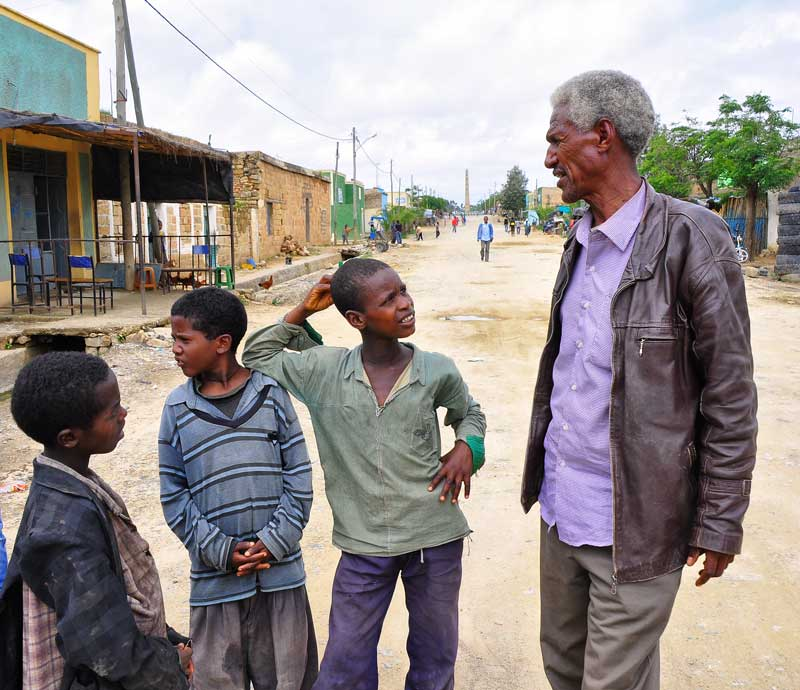

- Location within Ethiopia
- Coordinates: 13°59′N 39°26′E
- Country: Ethiopia
- Region: Tigray
- Zone: Misraqawi (Eastern)
- Woreda: Hawzen
- Elevation: 2,105 m (6,906 ft)

Population (2005)
  - Total: 5,638
- Time zone: UTC+3 (EAT)

Hawzen (Tigrinya: ሓውዜን, also transcribed as Hawzien or Hauzien) is a town in northern Ethiopia. Located in the Misraqawi (Eastern) Zone of the Tigray Region (or kilil), this town has a latitude and longitude of 13°58′N 39°26′E with an elevation of 2105 meters above sea level. Its market day is Wednesday. It is the largest settlement in Hawzen woreda.

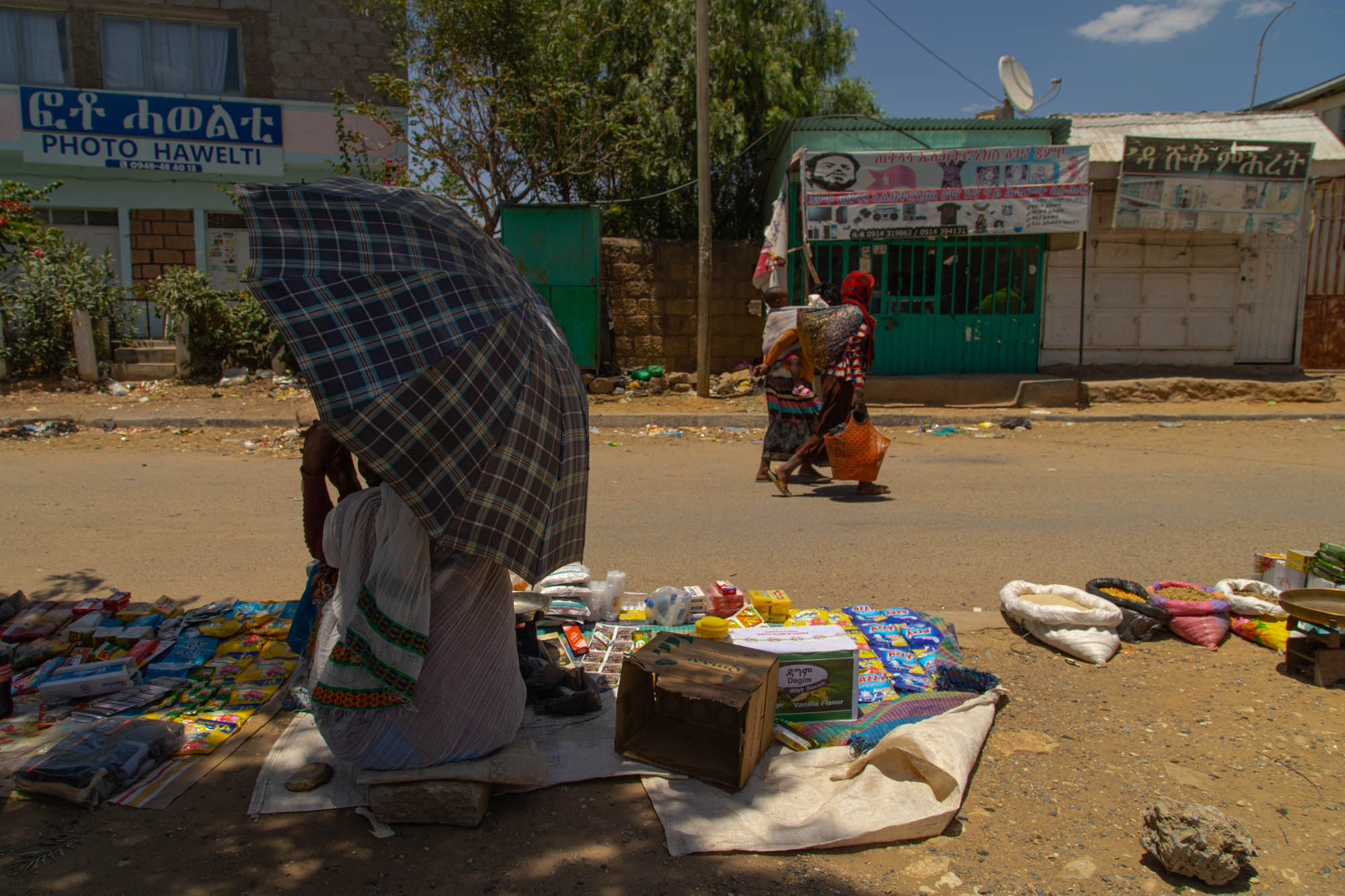
Street vendor in Hawzen on 6 June 2021

== History ==
=== Origins ===
Tradition states that Hawzen was founded by the Sadqan, a group of Christian missionaries who traveled to the Aksumite Kingdom during the reign of Kaleb of Aksum. Four ancient stelae, similar to the Gudit Stelae outside Axum, can be found in the marketplace. The Church of Hawzen Tekle Haymanot, although a modern structure, encloses "a small rock-hewn church thought to be one of the oldest in Tigray based on the finely carved capital and column".

=== 19th century ===
On 8 March 1892, Dejazmach Sebhat Aregawi submitted to Ras Mangesha Yohannes at Hawzen by ceremonially carrying a stone upon his neck before Ras Mangesha as the other Rases of Tigray and Ichege Tewoflos watched; Ras Mangesha then pardoned the Dejazmach. By March 1895, after the town of Adigrat was occupied by the advancing Italian army, Ras Mangesha assembled about 4,000 men at the town of Hawzen for an attack on Adigrat. Italian General Oreste Baratieri reacted by gathering 3,144 soldiers near Senafe, then marched to the support of the Italian-appointed governor, Ras Hagos Tafari. When Baratieri entered Adigrat on 25 March, Mangesha withdrew into the Tigray interior.

=== 20th century ===
In 1938, there was a shop, a post, telephone and telegraph office, a fountain, a health post and a technical school. The important market was also mentioned.

==== Air raids during the civil war of the 1980s ====
During the Ethiopian Civil War, Hawzen was bombed repeatedly from the air by the Ethiopian National Defence Forces:

- March-June 1988: 9 attacks, casualties not known.
- 22 June 1988: Hawzen massacre. In this air bombing of Hawzen's marketplace, carried out by the Derg against supposed TPLF fighters, up to 2,500 people were killed. A memorial currently stands to commemorate the dead.

=== 21st century ===
In 2020 and 2021, Hawzen was the site of various atrocities committed during the Tigray War.

== Demographics ==
In 1938, the town counted 2471 inhabitants.

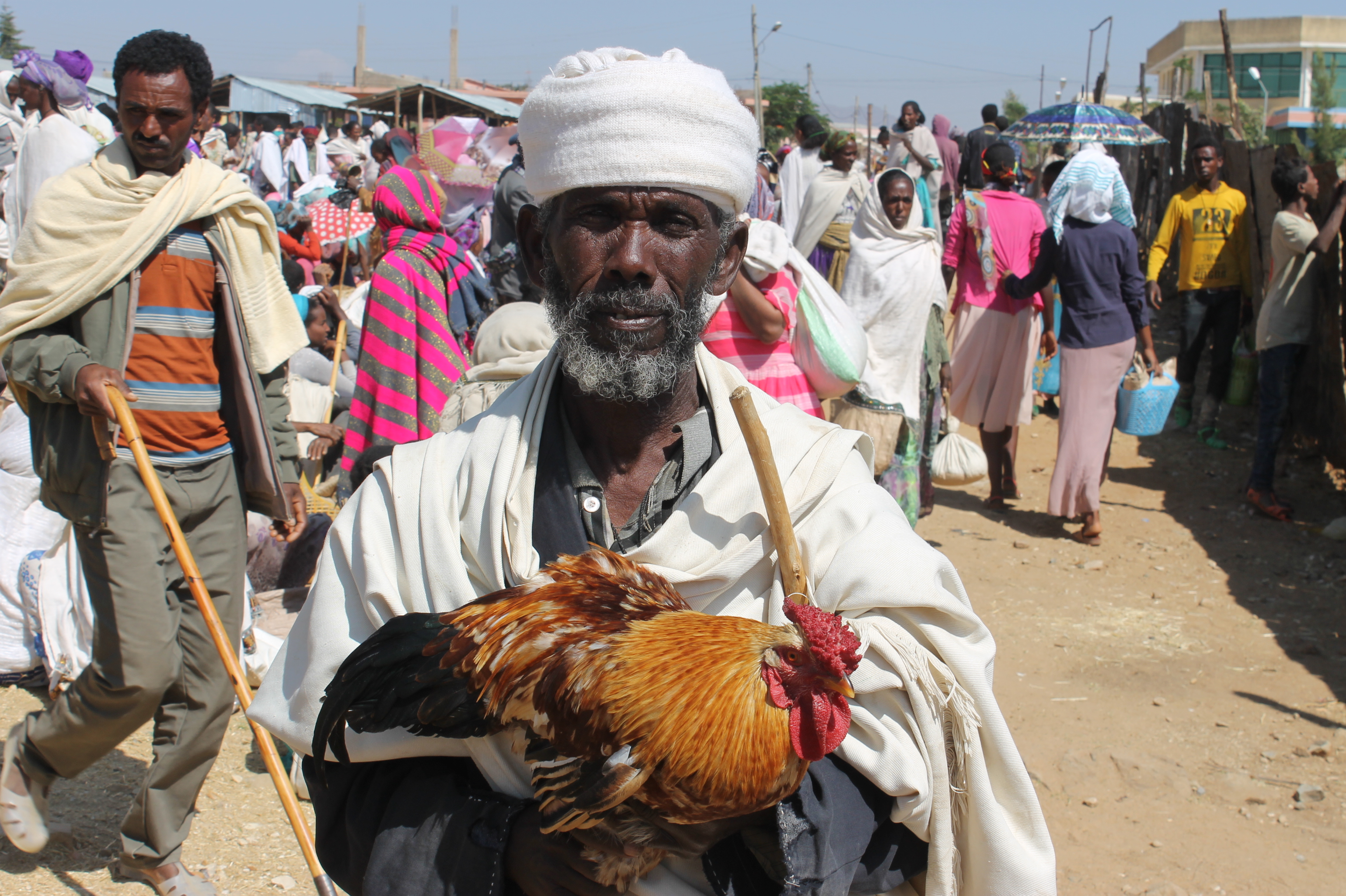
Hawzen market.

Based on figures from the Central Statistical Agency in 2005, Hawzen has an estimated total population of 5,638 of whom 2,616 are men and 3,022 are women. The 1994 census reported it had a total population of 3,250 of whom 1,393 were men and 1,857 were women.

== See also ==
- Hawzen massacre (1988)
- Hawzen in the Tigray war
