= Eritrea–Sudan relations =

- Eritrea: Sudan

Eritrea–Sudan relations have historically been tense, but have normalized in recent years.

== History ==
Eritrea and Sudan share a border that is 605 kilometers. The border areas of both countries have much in common, and the people on both sides of the border, such as Beni Amer and Hadendoa view themselves as a single people, divided by an artificial boundary. Between 1941 and 1952, Eritrea and Sudan were both administered by Britain, and during this period a severe conflict erupted between the Beni Amer and the Hadendoa over access to grazing land, lasting from 1942 to 1948. Although the fighting was ultimately brought to an end through a peace settlement, the confrontation likely left enduring tensions between the two communities.

By the end of 1993, shortly after Eritrea's independence from Ethiopia, Eritrea charged Sudan with supporting the activities of Eritrean Islamic Jihad, which carried out attacks against the Eritrean government. Eritrea broke relations with Sudan at the end of 1994, became a strong supporter of the Sudan People's Liberation Movement/Sudan People's Liberation Army (SPLA), and permitted the opposition National Democratic Alliance to locate its headquarters in the former Sudan embassy in Asmara. At the urging of the United States, Ethiopia and Eritrea joined Uganda in the so-called Front Line States strategy, which was designed to put military pressure on the Sudanese government.

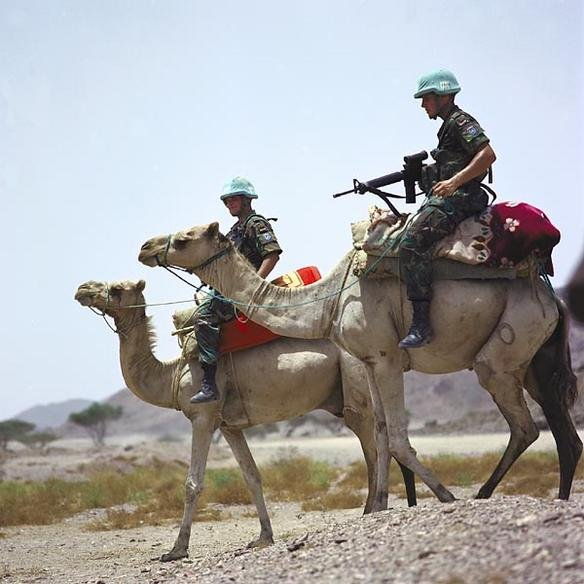
UN soldiers in Eritrea during the border conflict

On 6 May 1998, border clashes erupted between Ethiopia and Eritrea in the then-disputed border town of Badme, that was Ethiopian-administered. A large Eritrean mechanised force entered the town, and engaged in fighting with Ethiopian forces, including Tigrayan militia and security police, resulting in the deaths of several Eritrean officials. According to a 2005 ruling by the Permanent Court of Arbitration, Eritrea triggered the war by invading Ethiopia.

This surprise Eritrean invasion significantly changed the political situation in the wider region. Ethiopia moved to normalize relations with Sudan by the end of 1998, reflecting a shift in alliances driven by their shared opposition to Eritrea. In 2000, Eritrea also restored diplomatic ties with Sudan. However, relations between Sudan and Eritrea soon deteriorated again. In 2002, Sudan closed its border with Eritrea, and in February 2003 the Sudanese foreign minister accused Eritrea of deploying forces along the Sudan–Eritrea border. The Sudanese government also accused Eritrea of supporting rebel groups in Darfur. The undemarcated border with Sudan also posed a problem for Eritrean external relations.

Eritrea resumed diplomatic relations with Sudan on 10 December 2005. The presidents of Sudan and Eritrea met for the first time in five years in mid-2006 in Khartoum. Eritrea played a prominent role in brokering a peace agreement between the Sudanese government and Sudan's Eastern Front. This put Sudan–Eritrea relations on a new, positive track, although Sudan remained worried about Eritrea's activities in Darfur. The nations’ leaders met again in Khartoum near the end of 2006 and frequently in subsequent years. In 2007, president Isaias Afwerki also met with Salva Kiir in Juba. Isaias described relations with Sudan as resting on solid ground and having "bright prospects." Eritrea seemed to have ended its contacts with Darfur rebel groups and become supportive of the NPC in Sudan. It also established a consulate-general in South Sudan's capital of Juba, and its consul-general in May 2010 expressed support for the principle of self-determination. The same month, Yemane Ghebremeskel, a senior adviser to Isaias, commented that Eritrea hoped the January 2011 referendum would lead to the unity of Sudan.

In 2011, Eritrea and Sudan cooperated in the building of the Kassala-Al Lafa Highway linking the two countries. In 2012, the Eritrean President Isaias Afwerki, and his Sudanese counterpart Omar al-Bashir, held talks in Asmara on a number of bilateral issues of mutual concern to the two East African countries. The talks dealt with enhancing bilateral ties and cooperation including making their shared border more open. Sudan and Eritrea agreed to abolish entry visa requirements, opening their common borders for free movement of both nationals.

On 10 May 2014, the state-owned Sudan News Agency announced during Efwerki's visit to the Al Jeili oil refinery that Sudan had agreed to supply Eritrea with fuel and boost its economic partnership. It was also reported that the Sudanese Electricity Company planned to supply a 45-kilometre (28 mi) power line from Kassala to the Eritrean town of Teseney. On 4 May 2021, Isaias visited Khartoum to discuss the ongoing border dispute between Ethiopia and Sudan. In conversation with Abdel-Fattah al-Burhan, head of Sudan's Transitional Sovereignty Council, he raised regional issues and the long-time dispute over the Grand Ethiopian Renaissance Dam.

After the start of the ongoing war in Sudan, hundreds, possibly more than 3,500 Eritreans have been forcibly deported from Sudan in 2023.

== See also ==
- Foreign relations of Eritrea
- Foreign relations of Sudan
