= Geography of Sudan =

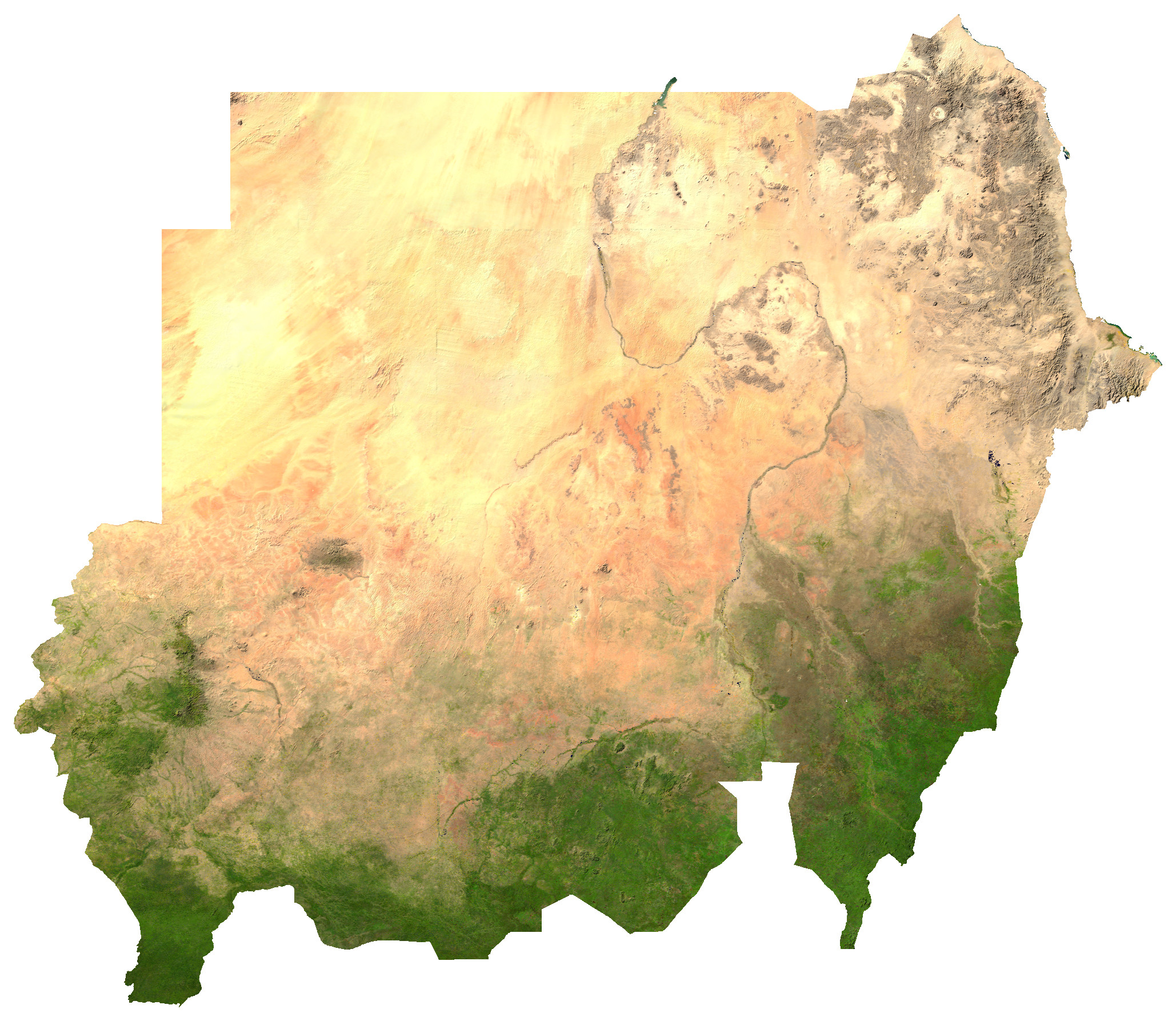
- Continent: Africa
- Region: Northeast Africa
- Coordinates: 15°00′N 30°00′E
- Area: Ranked 15th
  - Total: 1,857,392 km^{2} (717,143 sq mi)
- Coastline: 853 km (530 mi)
- Highest point: Deriba caldera, 3,042 metres (9,980 ft)
- Lowest point: Red Sea, 0 m
- Longest river: Nile
- Climate: arid; semi-arid in south

Sudan is located in Northeast Africa. It is bordered by Egypt to the north, the Red Sea to the northeast, Eritrea and Ethiopia to the east, South Sudan to the south, the Central African Republic to the southwest, Chad to the west and Libya to the northwest. Covering 1,857,392 km^{2} (717,143 sq mi), it is the third largest country in Africa, after Algeria and the Democratic Republic of the Congo. It was the largest country on the continent until South Sudan split off from it in 2011.

== Geographical regions ==
North Sudan Darfur Eastern Front, area of operations July 2006 Abyei South Kurdufan and Blue Nile

Northern Sudan – lying between the Egyptian border and Sennar – has two distinct parts, the desert and the Nile Valley. To the east of the Nile is the Nubian Desert and to the west, the Libyan Desert. Both are stony, with sandy dunes drifting over the landscape. There is virtually no rainfall in these deserts. Water in the Libyan desert is limited to a few small watering holes, such as Bir an Natrun, where the water table reaches the surface to form wells that provide water for nomads, caravans, and administrative patrols, although insufficient to support an oasis and inadequate to provide for a settled population. The Nubian Desert has no oases. Flowing through the desert is the Nile Valley, whose alluvial strip of habitable land is no more than two kilometers wide and whose productivity depends on the annual flood.

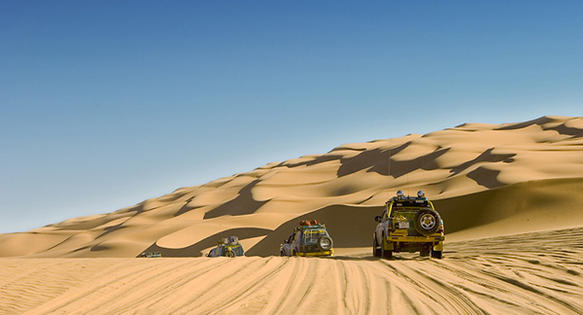
The desert of east Sudan

Sudan's western front encompasses the regions known as Darfur and Kurdufan that comprise 850,000 square kilometers or 328,000 square miles. Traditionally, this has been regarded as a single regional unit despite the physical differences. The dominant feature throughout this immense area is the absence of perennial streams; thus, people and animals must remain within reach of permanent wells. Consequently, the population is sparse and unevenly distributed. Western Darfur is an undulating plain dominated by the volcanic massif of Jabal Marrah towering 900 meters or 3,000 feet above the Sudanic plain; the drainage from Jabal Marrah onto the plain can support a settled population and a variety of wildlife (see East Saharan montane xeric woodlands). Western Darfur stands in contrast to northern and eastern Darfur, which are semi-deserts with little water either from the intermittent streams known as wadis or from wells that normally go dry during the winter months. Northwest of Darfur and continuing into Chad lies the unusual region called the jizzu, where sporadic winter rains generated from the Mediterranean frequently provide excellent grazing into January or even February. The southern region of western Sudan is known as the qoz, a land of sand dunes that in the rainy season is characterized by a rolling mantle of grass and has more reliable sources of water with its bore holes and hafri (sing., hafr) than the north does. The highest peak in Sudan – Deriba caldera, of the Marrah Mountains – is in this region. A unique feature of western Sudan is the Nuba mountain range of southeast Kurdufan in the center of the country, a conglomerate of isolated dome-shaped, sugarloaf hills that ascend steeply and abruptly from the great Sudanic plain. Many hills are isolated and extend only a few square kilometers, but there are several large hill masses with internal valleys that cut through the mountains high above the plain.

Sudan's third distinct region is the central clay plains that stretch eastward from the Nuba Mountains to the Ethiopian border, broken only by the Ingessana Hills, and from Khartoum in the north to the far reaches of southern Sudan. Between the Dindar and the Rahad rivers, a low ridge slopes down from the Ethiopian highlands contrasting the neighboring plains as do the occasional hills. The central clay plains provide the backbone of Sudan's economy because of the large amounts of settlements which are there due to the available water. In the heartland of the central clay plains lies the jazirah, (literally in Arabic "peninsula") the land between the Blue Nile and the White Nile where the great Gezira Scheme was developed. This project grows cotton for export and has historically produced more than half of Sudan's revenue and export earnings.

Northeast of the central clay plains lies eastern Sudan, which is divided between desert and semi-desert and includes the Butana, the Qash Delta, the Red Sea Hills, and the coastal plain. The Butana is an undulating land between Khartoum and Kassala that provides good grazing for cattle, sheep, and goats. East of the Butana is a geological formation known as the Qash Delta. Originally a depression, it has been filled with sand and silt brought down by the flash floods of the Qash River, creating a delta above the surrounding plain. Extending 100 kilometers north of Kassala, the whole area watered by the Qash is a rich grassland with bountiful cultivation long after the river has spent its waters on the surface of its delta. Trees and bushes provide grazing for the camels from the north, and the rich moist soil provides an abundance of food crops and cotton.

Northward beyond the Qash lie the Red Sea Hills. Dry, bleak, and cooler than the surrounding land, particularly in the heat of the Sudanese summer, they stretch northward into Egypt, a jumbled mass of hills where life is hard and unpredictable for the Beja inhabitants. Below the hills sprawls the coastal plain of the Red Sea, varying in width from about fifty-six kilometers in the south near Tawkar to about twenty-four kilometers near the Egyptian border. The coastal plain is dry and barren. It consists of rocks, and the seaward side is thick with coral reefs.

== Political geography ==
Sudan is divided into 18 states and one area with special administrative status. The states of Sudan are:

- Khartoum
- North Kordofan
- Northern
- Kassala
- Blue Nile
- North Darfur
- South Darfur
- South Kordofan
- Gezira
- White Nile
- River Nile
- Red Sea
- Al Qadarif
- Sennar
- West Darfur
- Central Darfur
- East Darfur
- West Kordofan (disestablished in 2005; reestablished in 2013)

As a result of the Comprehensive Peace Agreement signed in 2005, the Abyei Area was given special administrative status and following the independence of South Sudan in 2011, is considered to be simultaneously part of both the Republic of Sudan and the Republic of South Sudan, effectively a condominium.

== Area and boundaries ==
Area
- Total: 1,861,484 square kilometers (718,723 mi^{2})
  - country rank in the world: 15th
- Land: 1,731,671 square kilometers (668,602 mi^{2})
- Water: 129,813 square kilometers (50,121 mi^{2})

Area comparative
- Australia comparative: slightly larger than Queensland
- Canada comparative: slightly smaller than Nunavut
- United States comparative: approximately 1 1/4 times the size of Alaska

Land boundaries
- Total: 6,819 kilometers (4,237 mi).
- Border countries:
  - Central African Republic (174 kilometers or 108 miles)
  - Chad (1,403 kilometers or 872 miles)
  - Egypt (1,276 kilometers or 793 miles)
  - Eritrea (682 kilometers or 424 miles)
  - Ethiopia (744 kilometers or 462 miles)
  - Libya (382 kilometers or 237 miles)
  - South Sudan (2,158 kilometers or 1,341 miles).

== Islands ==
Sudan has islands located in the Nile and other rivers, in lakes and reservoirs and in the Red Sea.

=== River Islands ===
Tuti Island, Aba Island, Badien Island, Sai Island.

=== Red Sea Islands ===
==== Dungunab Bay ====
Mukawwar Island (Jazirat Magarsam), Jazirat Mayteb, Jazirat Bayer, Juzur Telat.

==== Suakin Archipelago ====
Talla Talla, Kebir Island, Taimashiya Island, Dar Ah Teras, Andi Seli, Masamarhu Island, Abu Isa Island, Dahrat ed Dak Hillat Island, Ed Dom esh Sheikh Island, Darrakah, Miyum, Zahrat Ghab, Jazirat Zahrat Abid, Gazirat Iri, Sayl Bahr, Gazirat Abid, Gazirat Wahman, Jaza'ir Amarat, Quban Island, Bakiyai Islands, Gazair Hayyis Wa Karai, Saqir Island, Sumar Island, Long Island, Gap Island, Two Islands.

=== Lake and Reservoir Islands ===
==== Roseires Reservoir ====
Jazirat Maqanza, Jazirat Abu Ushar, Jazirat Muluwwa.

==== Jebel Aulia Reservoir ====
Gazerat Jene't.

==== Er Rahad Lake ====
Four small islands and several islets.

== Climate ==
A Köppen climate classification map of Sudan.

Sudan is the thirteenth most water stressed country in the world.

Although Sudan lies within the tropics, the climate ranges from hyper-arid in the north to tropical wet-and-dry in the far southwest. Temperatures do not vary greatly with the season at any location; the most significant climatic variables are rainfall and the length of the wet and dry seasons. Variations in the length of the wet and dry seasons depend on which of two air flows predominates: dry northern winds from the Sahara and the Arabian Peninsula or moist southwesterly winds from the Congo River basin and southeasterly winds from the Indian Ocean.

From January to March, the country is under the influence of dry northeasterlies. There is minimal rainfall countrywide except for a small area in northwestern Sudan where the winds have passed over the Mediterranean bringing occasional light rains. By early April, the moist southwesterlies have reached southern Sudan, bringing heavy rains and thunderstorms. By July, the moist air has reached Khartoum, and in August it extends to its usual northern limits around Abu Hamad, sometimes the humid air reaches as far as the Egyptian border. The flow becomes weaker as it spreads north. In September the dry northeasterlies begin to strengthen and to push south and by the end of December they cover the entire country. Khartoum has a three-month rainy season (July–September) with an annual average rainfall of 161 millimeters (6.3 in); Atbarah receives showers in August that produce an annual average of only 74 millimeters (2.9 in).

In some years, the arrival of the southwesterlies and their rain in central Sudan can be delayed, or they may not come at all. When that happens, drought and famine follow. The decades of the 1970s and 1980s saw the southwesterlies frequently fail, with disastrous results for the Sudanese people and economy.

Temperatures are highest at the end of the dry season when cloudless skies and dry air allow them to soar. The far south, however, with only a short dry season, has uniformly high temperatures throughout the year. In Khartoum, the warmest months are May and June, when average highs are 41 °C (105.8 °F) and temperatures can reach 48 °C (118.4 °F). Northern Sudan, with its short rainy season, has very high daytime temperatures year round, except for winter months in the northwest where there is some precipitation in January and February. Conditions in highland areas are generally cooler, and the hot daytime temperatures during the dry season throughout central and northern Sudan fall rapidly after sunset. Lows in Khartoum average 15 °C (59 °F) in January and have dropped as low as 6 °C (42.8 °F) after the passing of a cool front in winter.

The haboob, a violent dust storm, can occur in central Sudan when the moist southwesterly flow first arrives (May through July). The moist, unstable air forms thunderstorms in the heat of the afternoon. The initial downflow of air from an approaching storm produces a huge yellow/red wall of sand and clay that can temporarily reduce visibility to zero.

Desert regions in central and northern Sudan are among the driest and the sunniest places on Earth: the sunshine duration is always uninterrupted year-round and rise to above 4,000 hours or about 91% of the time with the sky being cloudless all the time. Areas around Wadi Halfa and along the Egyptian border can easily pass many years or many decades without seeing any rainfall at all. They are also among the hottest places during their summertime and their "wintertime": averages high temperatures routinely exceed 40 °C (104 °F) for four to nearly six months a year to reach a maximum peak of about 45 °C (113 °F) in some places and averages high temperature remain above 24 °C (75.2 °F) in the northernmost region and above 30 °C (86 °F) in places such as Atbara or Meroe.

Climate data for Khartoum (1991–2020)
Month	Jan	Feb	Mar	Apr	May	Jun	Jul	Aug	Sep	Oct	Nov	Dec	Year
Record high °C (°F)	42.7 (108.9)	42.5 (108.5)	45.6 (114.1)	46.5 (115.7)	47.5 (117.5)	46.5 (115.7)	44.7 (112.5)	44.0 (111.2)	45.3 (113.5)	43.5 (110.3)	41.5 (106.7)	39.5 (103.1)	47.5 (117.5)
Mean daily maximum °C (°F)	31.0 (87.8)	33.7 (92.7)	37.0 (98.6)	40.6 (105.1)	42.1 (107.8)	41.5 (106.7)	38.8 (101.8)	36.9 (98.4)	38.9 (102.0)	39.5 (103.1)	35.6 (96.1)	32.1 (89.8)	37.3 (99.1)
Daily mean °C (°F)	23.6 (74.5)	25.9 (78.6)	29.1 (84.4)	32.8 (91.0)	35.0 (95.0)	34.9 (94.8)	32.7 (90.9)	31.1 (88.0)	32.7 (90.9)	32.9 (91.2)	28.8 (83.8)	25.0 (77.0)	30.4 (86.7)
Mean daily minimum °C (°F)	16.1 (61.0)	18.0 (64.4)	21.1 (70.0)	24.9 (76.8)	27.9 (82.2)	28.2 (82.8)	26.7 (80.1)	25.4 (77.7)	26.5 (79.7)	26.4 (79.5)	22.0 (71.6)	18.0 (64.4)	23.4 (74.1)
Record low °C (°F)	7.5 (45.5)	8.4 (47.1)	12.5 (54.5)	16.0 (60.8)	18.5 (65.3)	20.2 (68.4)	17.8 (64.0)	18.0 (64.4)	17.7 (63.9)	17.5 (63.5)	14.5 (58.1)	10.4 (50.7)	7.5 (45.5)
Average precipitation mm (inches)	0.0 (0.0)	0.0 (0.0)	0.0 (0.0)	0.4 (0.02)	4.7 (0.19)	3.4 (0.13)	24.9 (0.98)	53.1 (2.09)	24.5 (0.96)	9.1 (0.36)	0.3 (0.01)	0.0 (0.0)	120.4 (4.74)
Average precipitation days	0.0	0.0	0.0	0.0	0.7	0.6	2.8	4.8	2.3	1.1	0.0	0.0	12.4
Average relative humidity (%)	26	21	16	14	19	26	42	53	44	30	25	29	29
Average dew point °C (°F)	3.0 (37.4)	1.9 (35.4)	0.7 (33.3)	1.8 (35.2)	7.9 (46.2)	12.5 (54.5)	18.1 (64.6)	20.4 (68.7)	18.8 (65.8)	13.0 (55.4)	6.8 (44.2)	5.7 (42.3)	9.2 (48.6)
Mean monthly sunshine hours	316.2	296.6	316.2	318.0	310.0	279.0	269.7	272.8	273.0	306.9	303.0	319.3	3,580.7
Mean daily sunshine hours	9.8	9.8	9.7	9.8	8.9	8.2	7.3	7.4	8.3	9.5	10.0	9.9	9.1
Source 1: World Meteorological Organisation, NOAA (extremes and humidity 1961–1990)
Source 2: Deutscher Wetterdienst (sun, 1961–1990)

Climate data for Port Sudan, Sudan (1991–2020 normals, extremes 1906–present)
Month	Jan	Feb	Mar	Apr	May	Jun	Jul	Aug	Sep	Oct	Nov	Dec	Year
Record high °C (°F)	37 (99)	36.6 (97.9)	40 (104)	41.8 (107.2)	47 (117)	48.6 (119.5)	48.9 (120.0)	48.6 (119.5)	46.5 (115.7)	44.3 (111.7)	39 (102)	38 (100)	48.9 (120.0)
Mean daily maximum °C (°F)	27.3 (81.1)	27.8 (82.0)	29.7 (85.5)	32.9 (91.2)	37.0 (98.6)	40.2 (104.4)	42.7 (108.9)	42.7 (108.9)	39.5 (103.1)	34.9 (94.8)	31.4 (88.5)	28.7 (83.7)	34.6 (94.3)
Daily mean °C (°F)	23.5 (74.3)	23.5 (74.3)	24.7 (76.5)	27.5 (81.5)	31.0 (87.8)	33.7 (92.7)	36.2 (97.2)	36.6 (97.9)	33.6 (92.5)	30.2 (86.4)	27.7 (81.9)	25.1 (77.2)	29.4 (84.9)
Mean daily minimum °C (°F)	19.8 (67.6)	19.2 (66.6)	19.7 (67.5)	22.1 (71.8)	24.9 (76.8)	27.2 (81.0)	29.6 (85.3)	30.5 (86.9)	27.8 (82.0)	25.5 (77.9)	23.9 (75.0)	21.5 (70.7)	24.3 (75.7)
Record low °C (°F)	10 (50)	10 (50)	10 (50)	12.3 (54.1)	17.4 (63.3)	17.2 (63.0)	20 (68)	20 (68)	18.9 (66.0)	16 (61)	17.5 (63.5)	9 (48)	9 (48)
Average precipitation mm (inches)	2.3 (0.09)	0.1 (0.00)	0.1 (0.00)	8.8 (0.35)	1.0 (0.04)	0.9 (0.04)	3.8 (0.15)	2.3 (0.09)	0.0 (0.0)	17.9 (0.70)	24.6 (0.97)	18.8 (0.74)	80.6 (3.17)
Average precipitation days (≥ 1.0 mm)	0.3	0.0	0.0	0.4	0.3	0.1	0.7	0.4	0.0	1.3	2.3	1.3	7.1
Average relative humidity (%)	64	65	63	58	46	37	38	40	50	65	68	67	55
Mean monthly sunshine hours	195.3	204.4	266.6	291.0	310.0	264.0	229.4	223.2	264.0	279.0	228.0	182.9	2,937.8
Source 1: NOAA
Source 2: Meteo Climat (record highs and lows)

Climate data for El Fasher (1991–2020 normals, extremes 1961–2020)
Month	Jan	Feb	Mar	Apr	May	Jun	Jul	Aug	Sep	Oct	Nov	Dec	Year
Record high °C (°F)	39.5 (103.1)	41.0 (105.8)	42.2 (108.0)	43.0 (109.4)	46.3 (115.3)	44.2 (111.6)	41.7 (107.1)	43.5 (110.3)	41.5 (106.7)	40.0 (104.0)	38.4 (101.1)	36.7 (98.1)	46.3 (115.3)
Mean daily maximum °C (°F)	29.5 (85.1)	32.5 (90.5)	35.5 (95.9)	38.2 (100.8)	39.2 (102.6)	38.9 (102.0)	36.3 (97.3)	34.1 (93.4)	35.9 (96.6)	36.2 (97.2)	33.1 (91.6)	30.1 (86.2)	35.0 (95.0)
Daily mean °C (°F)	20.3 (68.5)	23.0 (73.4)	26.3 (79.3)	29.4 (84.9)	31.3 (88.3)	31.7 (89.1)	30.1 (86.2)	28.5 (83.3)	29.4 (84.9)	28.8 (83.8)	24.3 (75.7)	21.0 (69.8)	27.0 (80.6)
Mean daily minimum °C (°F)	11.1 (52.0)	13.6 (56.5)	17.1 (62.8)	20.6 (69.1)	23.5 (74.3)	24.5 (76.1)	23.9 (75.0)	22.9 (73.2)	22.9 (73.2)	21.3 (70.3)	15.6 (60.1)	11.8 (53.2)	19.1 (66.4)
Record low °C (°F)	0.7 (33.3)	1.4 (34.5)	6.5 (43.7)	8.2 (46.8)	12.8 (55.0)	15.7 (60.3)	15.6 (60.1)	13.5 (56.3)	15.0 (59.0)	7.1 (44.8)	5.6 (42.1)	2.0 (35.6)	0.7 (33.3)
Average precipitation mm (inches)	0 (0)	0 (0)	0 (0)	1 (0.0)	6.5 (0.26)	16.4 (0.65)	60.0 (2.36)	102.9 (4.05)	28.9 (1.14)	3.8 (0.15)	0 (0)	0 (0)	219.5 (8.64)
Average precipitation days (≥ 1.0 mm)	0	0	0	0.2	0.8	2.2	6.1	8.8	3.4	0.6	0	0	22
Average relative humidity (%)	24	19	16	17	23	32	47	57	44	28	24	24	30
Mean monthly sunshine hours	306.9	274.4	291.4	282.0	266.6	231.0	213.9	213.9	237.0	285.2	306.0	313.1	3,221.4
Source: NOAA

Climate data for Atbara (1991–2020 normals, extremes 1943–present)
Month	Jan	Feb	Mar	Apr	May	Jun	Jul	Aug	Sep	Oct	Nov	Dec	Year
Record high °C (°F)	41 (106)	42 (108)	46.1 (115.0)	47.1 (116.8)	48 (118)	48 (118)	47.7 (117.9)	47 (117)	47.6 (117.7)	44.6 (112.3)	43 (109)	39.4 (102.9)	48 (118)
Mean daily maximum °C (°F)	30.6 (87.1)	33.1 (91.6)	36.7 (98.1)	40.7 (105.3)	43.2 (109.8)	44.0 (111.2)	41.9 (107.4)	40.8 (105.4)	42.1 (107.8)	40.3 (104.5)	35.8 (96.4)	31.9 (89.4)	38.4 (101.1)
Daily mean °C (°F)	22.5 (72.5)	24.5 (76.1)	27.8 (82.0)	31.9 (89.4)	35.9 (96.6)	36.0 (96.8)	35.0 (95.0)	34.2 (93.6)	35.1 (95.2)	33.1 (91.6)	28.2 (82.8)	24.1 (75.4)	30.7 (87.3)
Mean daily minimum °C (°F)	14.5 (58.1)	15.9 (60.6)	18.8 (65.8)	23.0 (73.4)	28.6 (83.5)	28.0 (82.4)	28.0 (82.4)	27.6 (81.7)	28.0 (82.4)	25.8 (78.4)	20.6 (69.1)	16.2 (61.2)	22.9 (73.2)
Record low °C (°F)	6 (43)	5.5 (41.9)	10 (50)	13 (55)	18.8 (65.8)	21 (70)	19 (66)	18.6 (65.5)	20 (68)	16.4 (61.5)	11.7 (53.1)	6.5 (43.7)	5.5 (41.9)
Average precipitation mm (inches)	0.0 (0.0)	0.0 (0.0)	0.0 (0.0)	0.2 (0.01)	3.4 (0.13)	0.8 (0.03)	10.8 (0.43)	24.2 (0.95)	5.3 (0.21)	5.1 (0.20)	0.0 (0.0)	0.0 (0.0)	49.7 (1.96)
Average precipitation days (≥ 1.0 mm)	0.0	0.0	0.0	0.1	0.5	0.2	1.2	2.0	0.9	0.5	0.0	0.0	5.5
Average relative humidity (%)	38	32	25	23	24	23	36	41	34	32	37	40	32
Average dew point °C (°F)	7.5 (45.5)	6.7 (44.1)	6.0 (42.8)	8.2 (46.8)	10.1 (50.2)	11.6 (52.9)	17.7 (63.9)	19.0 (66.2)	16.9 (62.4)	14.2 (57.6)	12.1 (53.8)	9.6 (49.3)	11.6 (53.0)
Mean monthly sunshine hours	275.9	257.6	282.1	282.0	266.6	243.0	226.3	207.7	225.0	282.1	288.0	288.3	3,124.6
Source 1: NOAA
Source 2: Meteo Climat (record temperatures)

== Hydrology ==
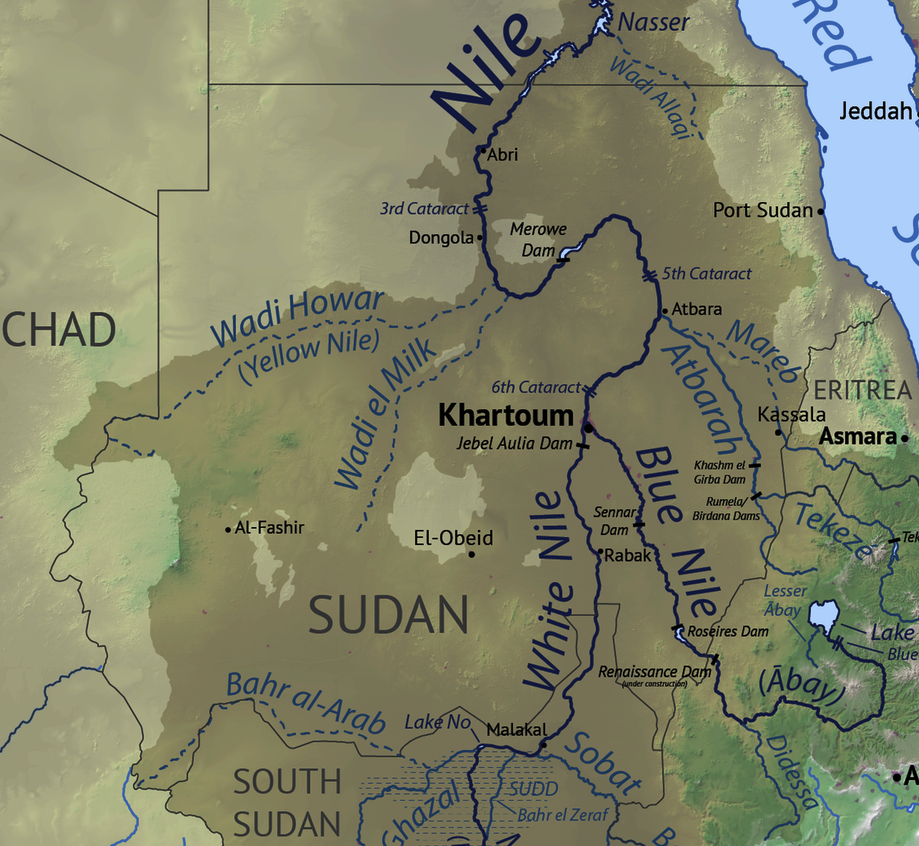
Nile and its tributaries in Sudan

Except for a small area in northeastern Sudan, where wadis discharge the sporadic runoff into the Red Sea and rivers from Eritrea that flow into shallow evaporating ponds west of the Red Sea Hills, the entire country is drained by the Nile and its two main tributaries, the Blue Nile and the White Nile. The longest river in the world, the Nile flows for 6,737 kilometers from its farthest headwaters in Central Africa to the Mediterranean. The importance of the Nile has been recognized since biblical times; for centuries the river has been a lifeline for Sudan. Approximately 18,900 square kilometers (7,300 mi^{2}) were irrigated as of 2012.

The Blue Nile flows out of the Ethiopian highlands to meet the White Nile at Khartoum. The Blue Nile is the smaller of the two rivers; its flow usually accounts for only one-sixth of the total. In August, however, the rains in the Ethiopian highlands swell the Blue Nile until it accounts for 90 percent of the Nile’s total flow. Sudan has constructed several dams to regulate the river’s flow, including the Roseires Dam, about 100 kilometers from the Ethiopian border and the largest, the 40-meter-high Sinnar Dam constructed in 1925 at Sinnar. The Blue Nile’s two main tributaries, the Dindar and the Rahad, have headwaters in the Ethiopian highlands and discharge water into the Blue Nile only during the summer high-water season. For the remainder of the year, their flow is reduced to pools in sandy riverbeds.

The White Nile flows north from Central Africa, draining Lake Victoria and highland regions of Uganda, Rwanda, and Burundi. South of Khartoum, the British built the Jabal al-Awliya Dam in 1937 to store the water of the White Nile and then release it in the fall when the flow from the Blue Nile slackens. Much water from the reservoir has been diverted for irrigation projects in central Sudan and much of the remainder evaporates. By now, silt deposits have curtailed the overall flow.

North of Khartoum, the Nile flows through the desert in a large S-shaped pattern to empty into Lake Nasser behind the Aswan High Dam in Egypt. The river flows slowly beyond Khartoum, dropping little in elevation, although five cataracts hinder river transport at times of low water. The Atbarah River, flowing out of Ethiopia, is the only tributary north of Khartoum, and its waters only reach the Nile from July to December. During the rest of the year, the Atbarah’s bed is dry, except for a few pools and ponds.

== Soils ==
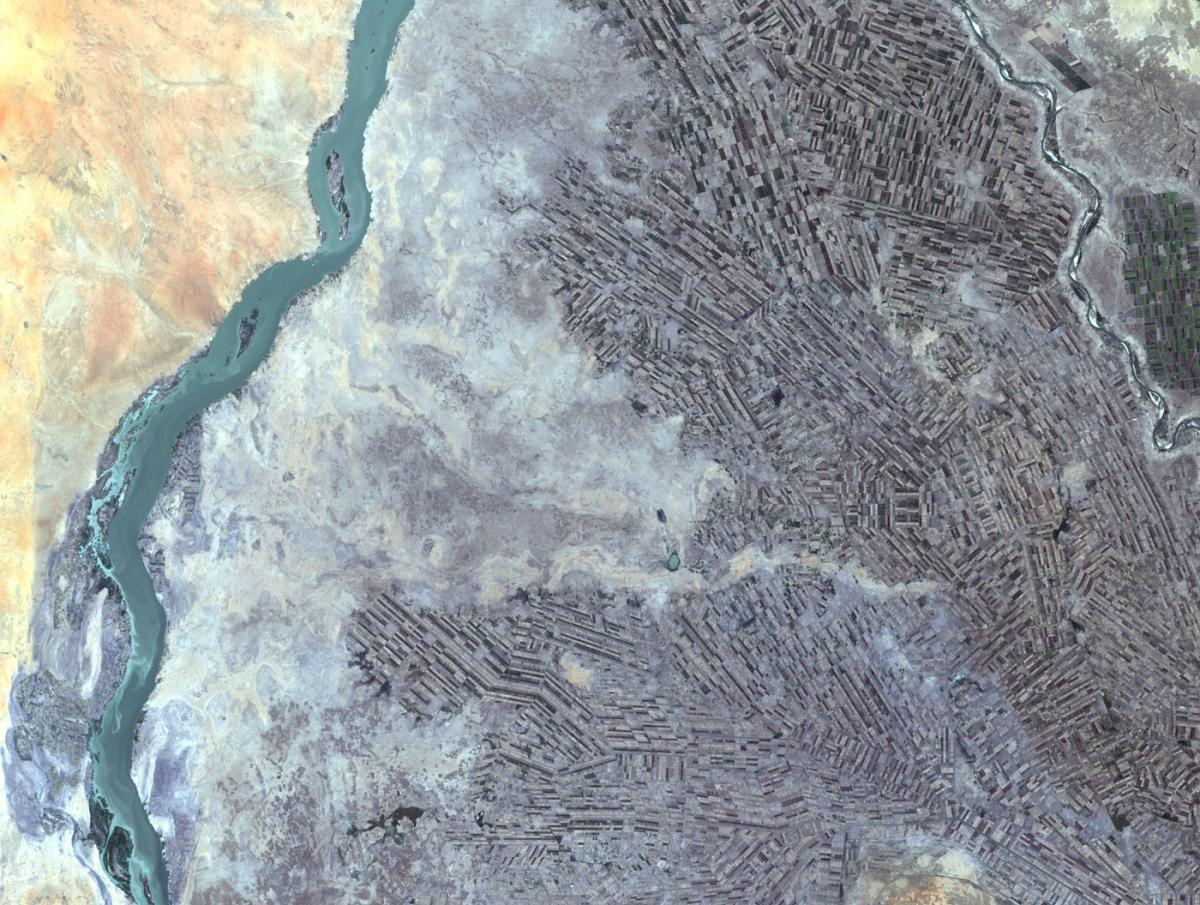
Farming along White and Blue Nile Rivers, near Khartoum, Sudan.

The country's soils can be divided geographically into a few groups, the sandy soils of the northern and west central areas, the clay soils of the central region, and the laterite soils of the south. Less extensive and widely separated, but of major economic importance, is another group consisting of alluvial soils found along the lower reaches of the White Nile and Blue Nile, along the Nile to Lake Nubia, in the delta of the Qash River in the Kassala area, and in the Baraka Delta in the area of Tawkar near the Red Sea in Kassala State.

Agriculturally, the most important soils are the clays in central Sudan that extend from west of Kassala and southern Kurdufan. They are known as cracking soils because of the practice of allowing them to dry out and crack during the dry months to restore their permeability and are used in Al Jazirah and Khashm al Qirbah for irrigated cultivation. East of the Blue Nile, large areas are used for mechanized rainfed crops. West of the White Nile, these soils are used by traditional cultivators to grow sorghum, sesame, peanuts, and (in the area around the Nuba Mountains) cotton. The southern part of the clay soil zone lies in the broad floodplain of the upper reaches of the White Nile and its tributaries, covering most of Aali an Nil and upper Bahr al Ghazal in South Sudan. Subject to heavy rainfall during the rainy season, the floodplain proper is inundated for four to six months — a large swampy area, the Sudd in South Sudan, is permanently flooded — and adjacent areas are flooded for one or two months. In general this area is poorly suited to crop production, but the grasses it supports during dry periods are used for grazing.

The sandy soils in the semi-arid areas south of the desert in North Kurdufan and North Darfur support vegetation used for grazing. In the southern part of these states and the West Darfur and South Darfur are the so-called qoz sands. The qoz sands are the principal area from which gum arabic is obtained through tapping of Acacia senegal (known locally as hashab). This tree grows readily in the region, and cultivators occasionally plant hashab trees when land is returned to fallow. Though livestock raising is this area's major activity, a significant amount of crop cultivation, mainly of pearl millet, also occurs. Peanuts and sesame are grown as cash crops.

== Natural resources ==
Petroleum is Sudan's most important natural resource. The country also has significant deposits of chromium, copper, iron, mica, silver, gold, tungsten, and zinc.

== Environmental issues ==
Sudan faces some severe environmental problems, most related either to the availability of water or its disposal. Among them are desertification, land degradation, and deforestation. Desertification, the southward shift of the boundary between desert and semi-desert, has occurred at an estimated rate of 50 to 200 kilometers since records of rainfall and vegetation began in the 1930s. Its impact has been most notable in North Darfur and North Kordofan. Desertification is likely to continue its southward progression because of declining precipitation and will lead to continued loss of productive land. Agriculture, particularly poorly planned and managed mechanized agriculture, has led to land degradation, water pollution, and related problems. Land degradation has also resulted from an explosive growth in the size of livestock herds since the 1960s that have overused grazing areas. Deforestation has occurred at an alarming rate. Sudan as a whole might have lost nearly 12 percent of its forest cover between 1990 and 2005, or about 8.8 million hectares, a loss driven primarily by land clearance and energy needs.

Compounding Sudan’s environmental problems are long years of warfare and the resultant camps for large numbers of internally displaced people, who scour the surrounding land for water, fuel, and food. Experts from the United Nations predict that Sudan’s current program of dam construction on the Nile and its tributaries will cause riverbank erosion and loss of fertilizing silt. In urban areas, rapid and uncontrolled population influx into Khartoum and other cities and towns and the general lack of facilities to manage solid waste and sewage are among major environmental concerns.

== See also ==
- Extreme points of Sudan
