= Sudanese refugee crisis =

Ongoing refugee crisis caused by the Sudanese civil war

- Part of the Sudanese civil war (2023–present)
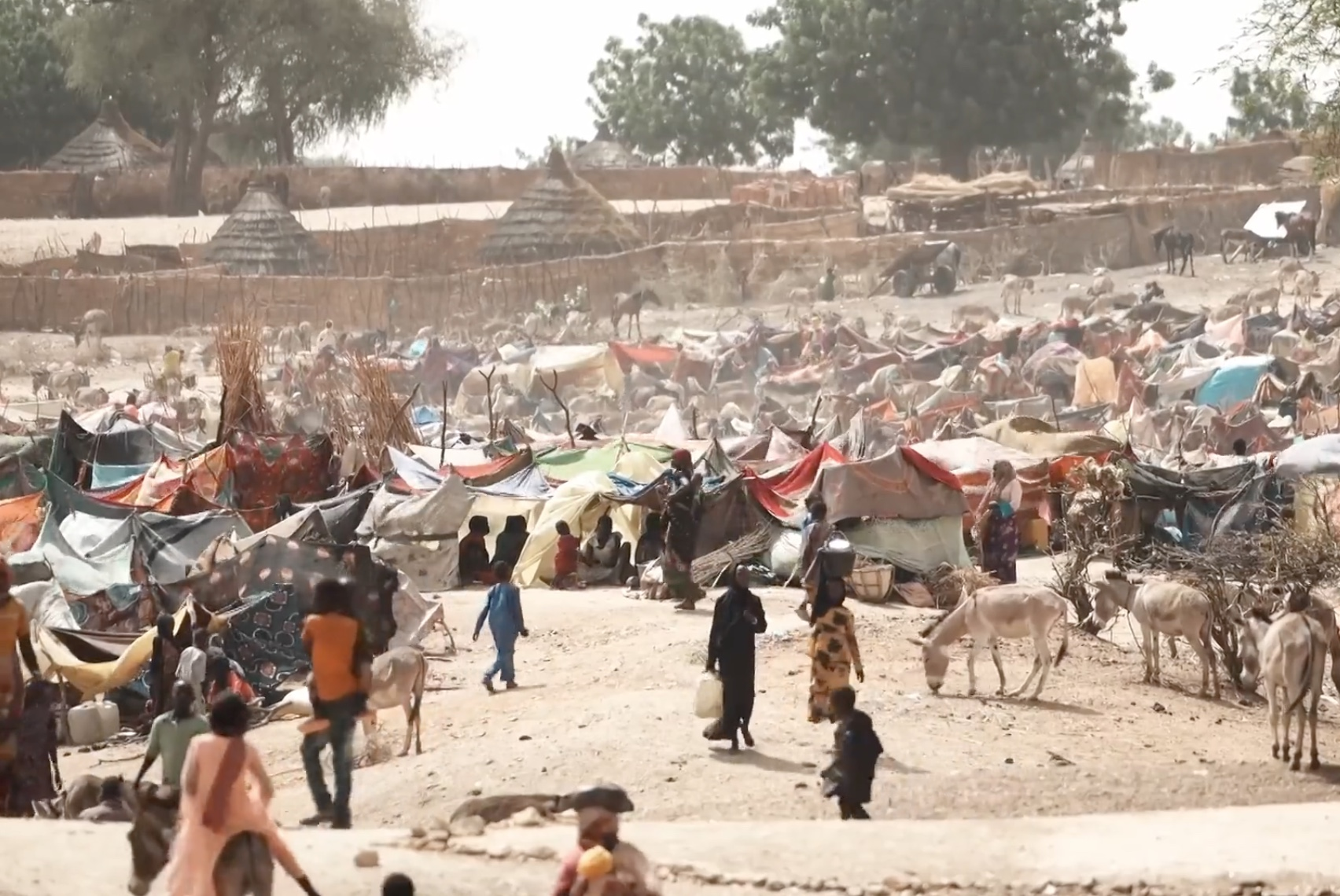
- A Chadian camp for displaced people who fled violence in Darfur at the Chad-Sudan border where over 90,000 people have fled and thousands have been displaced.
- Date: 15 April 2023 – present
- Location: *Sudan; North Africa; Central Africa; East Africa
- Displaced: 12 million

An ongoing refugee crisis began in Sudan in mid-April 2023 after the outbreak of the Sudanese civil war. As of November 2025, the conflict has forced more than 11.7 million people from their homes, including about 7.26 million displaced within Sudan and a further 4.25 million who have crossed the border, making it the largest displacement crisis in the world.

The vast majority of these civilians entered the neighboring country of Chad with the United Nations reporting most of these people came from Darfur and Khartoum, but thousands more moved to other countries. By May 2024, the UN reported at least 675,000 refugees in South Sudan, 500,000–550,000 in Egypt, 75,000 people in Ethiopia, 30,000 in the Central African Republic, 600,000 in Chad, and 3,500 in Libya. Some 11.6 million people were reportedly stuck or displaced across the country owing to the increase in violence and a humanitarian crisis that affected 25 million people, equivalent to more than half of Sudan's population.

== Background ==
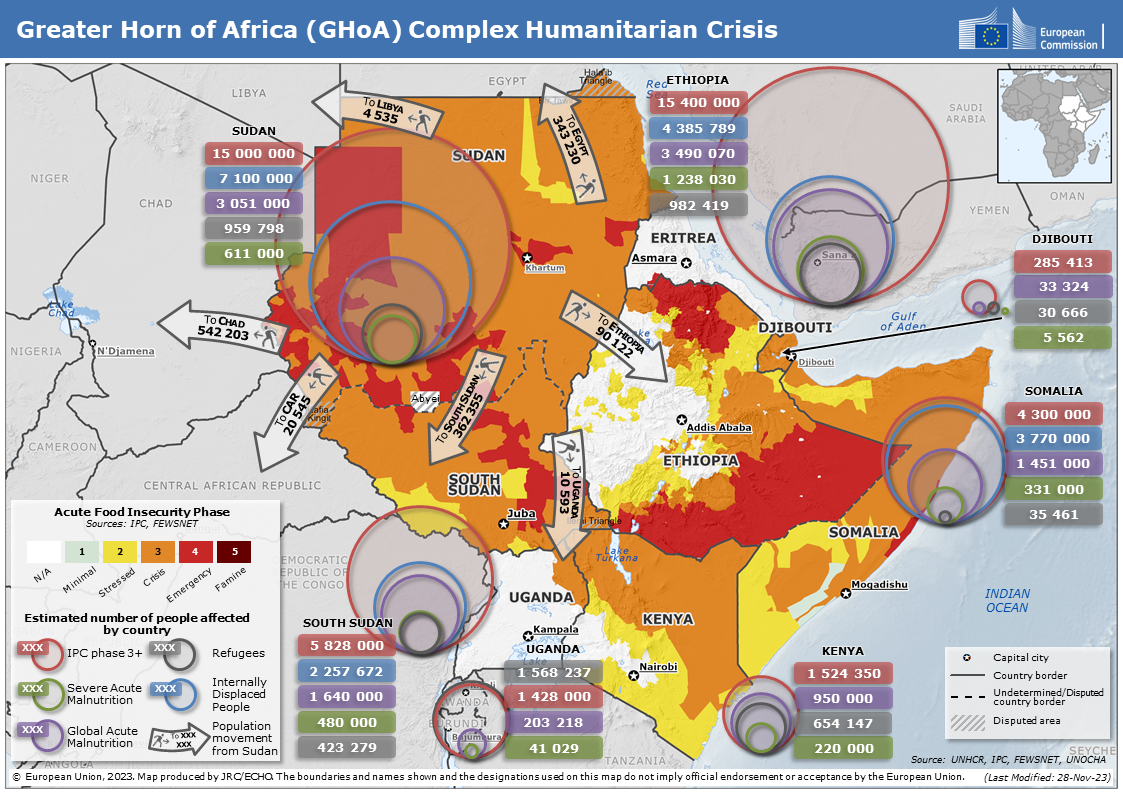
The humanitarian crisis in the area in November 2023

Before the 2023–present conflict, many Sudanese had already fled earlier periods of violence, including the civil wars and the wars in Darfur, leaving at least 400,000 people across the border in Chad and hundreds of thousands more in neighbouring countries such as South Sudan and Egypt.

On 15 April 2023, the Rapid Support Forces (RSF) launched a surprise attack on multiple Sudanese Army bases across the country, including in the capital Khartoum. RSF forces claimed to have captured Khartoum International Airport, Merowe Airport, El Obeid Airport as well as a base in Soba. Clashes between the RSF and the SAF erupted at the Presidential Palace and at the residence of General al-Burhan, with both sides claiming control over the two sites. In response, the SAF announced the closure of all airports in the country, and the Sudanese Air Force conducted airstrikes on RSF positions in Khartoum with artillery fire being heard in different parts of the city. Fighting continued in the following weeks and spread to the Darfur region, which was recovering from an internal conflict and genocide in the 2000s, and in the Kordofan region, where remnants of South Sudanese separatist groups joined sides with either the SAF or the RSF.

As of November 2025, the conflict has forced more than 11.7 million people from their homes. This includes around 7.26 million people displaced within Sudan and more than 270,000 refugees in Sudan who have had to relocate again. A further 4.25 million people have crossed into neighbouring countries or returned to their states of origin under difficult conditions, including 3.39 million newly arrived refugees and asylum seekers and about 851,000 refugee returnees. Those fleeing Sudan have primarily moved toward the Central African Republic, Chad, Egypt, Ethiopia, Libya, South Sudan and Uganda. Many others have moved to different locations within Sudan to seek safety.

== Internally displaced people ==
In November 2023, the UN said the conflict created the largest child displacement crisis in the world. 53% of those who have been internally displaced due to the conflict are children.

The United Nations said on 23 December 2023 that the fighting in Sudan had produced 5.6 million internally displaced persons. 1.7 million of them were reported to have fled or been displaced from Khartoum alone. Some of them faced difficulties such as the presence of roadblocks and robberies along the roads. The Norwegian Refugee Council said that there were about 300 refugees from Khartoum who had fled southeast to El-Gadarif. 3,000 refugees from Khartoum fled to Tunay bah refugee camp, which already hosts 28,000 Ethiopian refugees, in eastern Sudan, while at least 20,000 fled to Wad Madani. Up to 260,000 people fled to White Nile State, which borders South Sudan. Up to 37,000 people were thought to have been displaced across Nyala, the capital of South Darfur. The IOM said that all of Sudan's 18 states experienced displacement, with most refugees coming from Khartoum, which accounted for about 69 percent of the total number of displaced people, followed by West Darfur with more than 17 percent. More than 32,000 people were internally displaced when fighting between the SAF and the rebel SPLM-N (al-Hilu faction) broke out in Blue Nile State in June, while 83,000 were displaced in South Kordofan.

By February 2025, there were more than 8.8 million internally displaced persons (IDPs), making Sudan the largest host of IDPs globally. The International Organization for Migration estimated that 31% of IDPs originated from Khartoum state, followed by 18% from South Darfur state and 15% from North Darfur state.

By September 2025, Sudan had 6.2 million internally displaced people and was facing the largest internal displacement crisis in the world.

=== Living conditions ===
By January 2025, nearly five million people, representing about 44% of Sudan's displaced population, were living in a range of displacement sites across the country's 18 states, including camps, collective centres, informal settlements and other temporary locations, while the remaining 56% are staying in host communities. Many displacement sites are severely overcrowded and fall below WHO minimum standards, with limited access to basic services, inadequate WASH facilities and overstretched local resources. In Kassala, numerous sites lack sufficient latrines, and in Gedaref host communities have struggled to absorb new arrivals from eastern Gezira. Rising cholera cases in Gedaref, particularly among IDPs, have further strained the response, as displacement sites are dispersed across many locations with differing population sizes, complicating efforts to provide consistent and effective assistance.

The conflict has driven large numbers of people from urban centres such as Khartoum, where water systems were relatively stronger, into rural areas with far fewer essential services. This movement has caused overcrowding in regions already short of resources, with inadequate water and sanitation infrastructure.

== Refugees outside Sudan ==
=== Egypt ===
The largest share of Sudanese refugees have fled to Egypt, which has been a preferred destination due to its geographic proximity, relatively stronger economy, and the absence of formal refugee camps. Cultural, linguistic, and religious affinities, including the shared use of Arabic and a predominantly Sunni Muslim population in both countries, have contributed to a sense of familiarity. Existing Sudanese communities, lower living costs compared with Gulf states, and the ability to remain close to Sudan have further reinforced Egypt’s appeal, particularly for refugees who view their displacement as temporary. However, since 2023, Egypt’s refugee practice and legal framework became increasingly restrictive.

By November 2024, within 19 months of conflict, Egypt had received over 1.2 million Sudanese refugees, with slightly more than 600,000 registered with UNHCR. Women and children accounted for nearly three quarters of this population. However, local and international nongovernmental organizations have suggested that the actual number of Sudanese refugees in Egypt is considerably higher.

=== Chad ===
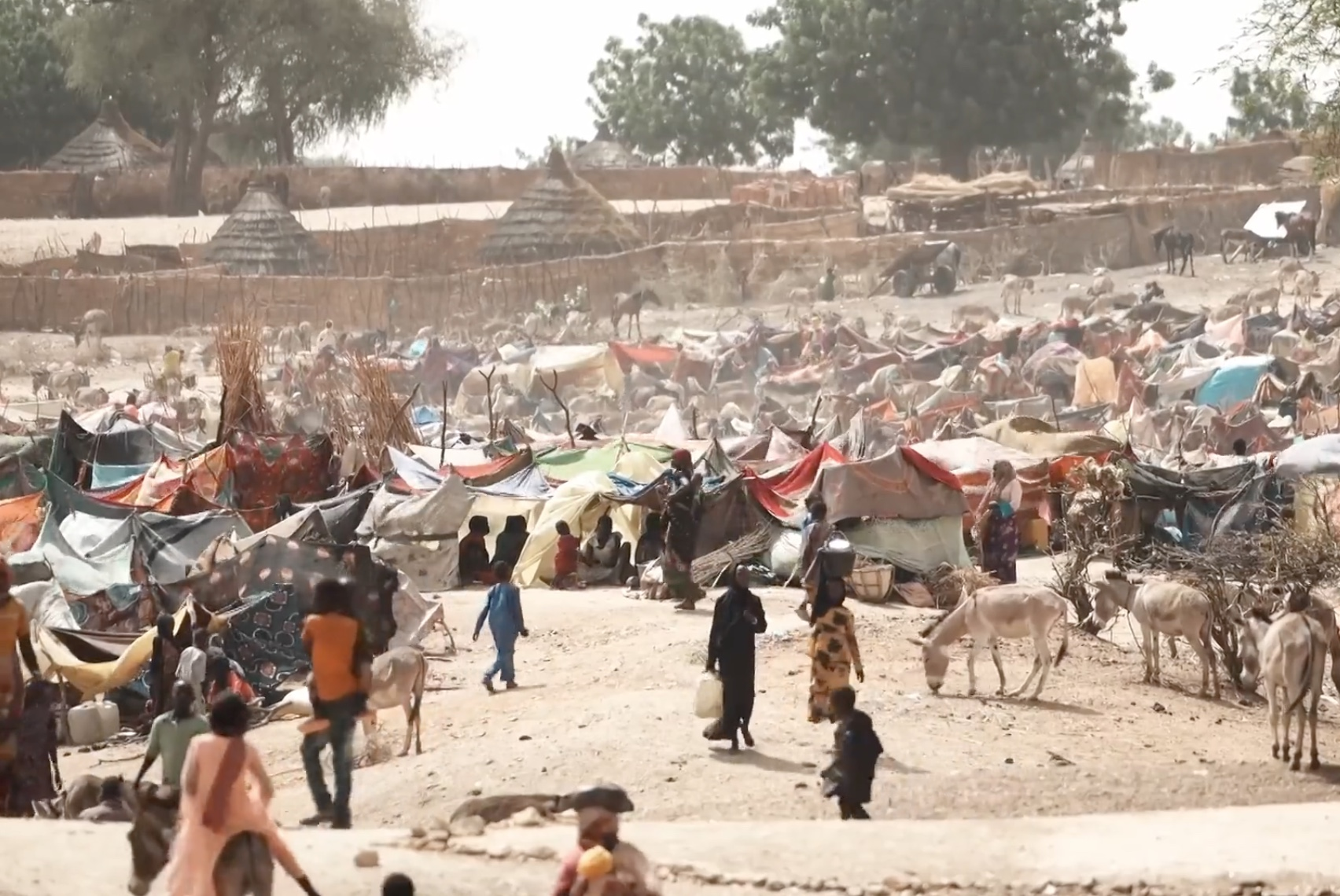
Sudanese refugee camp in Chad, 16 May 2023.

On 15 April, Chad reported thousands of refugees coming past the now closed border between the nation and Sudan. Over the following days the UN reported a massive influx of refugees crossing mainly from Darfur amounting to 20,000 people by 19 April, more than 90,000 by late May, 239,000 by July, more than 400,000 people by August 2023, and 870,000 by July 2025.

The UN announced later on that the refugees lacked basic needs such as food and shelter. Reports also suggested that the majority of them were women and children. More than 160,000 of them were members of the Masalit ethnic group who were fleeing ethnically based attacks by the RSF and allied militias.

=== South Sudan ===
On 24 April 2023, South Sudan's Renk County reported thousands of refugees seeking shelter in the country. Authorities estimated the volume of refugees to be at least 10,000 people, three-quarters of whom were South Sudanese who had previously fled north to escape internal conflicts and the rest consisting of Sudanese and other African nationals. By June, the number of refugees had risen to over 115,000, and more than 259,000 by September 2023.

South Sudan was one of the most difficult destinations for Sudanese refugees, owing to fragile state institutions, a weak economy, and ongoing insecurity. Although South Sudan's civil war formally ended in 2018, the country continues to face large scale displacement, with around 2 million internally displaced people and a further 2.4 million South Sudanese refugees and asylum seekers living abroad, including in Sudan. The return of large numbers of South Sudanese from Sudan, alongside new arrivals from Sudan, has placed additional strain on limited infrastructure and services, exacerbating social tensions.

=== Uganda ===
Uganda hosts one of the world's largest refugee populations and is known for a model based on open borders, land allocation and access to work and public services. By October 2025, the country had taken in roughly 1.95 million refugees, largely rural groups mainly from South Sudan and the Democratic Republic of the Congo. Since the conflict began, Uganda had seen a steady rise in arrivals from Sudan. The number of new arrivals increased sharply during 2024, then decreased somewhat in 2025. By October 2025, more than 91,563 Sudanese refugees were officially registered in the country.

The influx of Sudanese refugees placed new pressures on Uganda's largely rural, land-based settlement system. The refugee population had a wide range of educational backgrounds, from highly educated individuals to those with little or no formal schooling, reflecting the diverse groups displaced by the war. Many of the new arrivals were not agricultural workers seeking land in rural settlements but urban professionals from Khartoum, Darfur and other cities, including teachers, lawyers, business owners and students. They chose to avoid rural settlements and moved directly to urban areas such as Kampala, Entebbe and Arua, where life was difficult. With no food aid, scarce employment opportunities and rising living costs, many urban refugees found themselves in a state of uncertainty, out of immediate danger, yet unable to establish stable livelihoods.

As of June 2025, a sharp drop in donor funding, including significant reductions from the United States, led to a widespread breakdown of key services. Food assistance was heavily reduced, leaving around 60 percent of refugees without support. Health and education services began to decline quickly. The World Food Programme, already operating with limited resources, was no longer permitted to provide cash assistance in many areas, and its nutrition programmes could not keep up with rising needs.

The Ugandan government reiterated its commitment to hosting refugees despite strained national resources. However, the system supporting them was increasingly under pressure. Transit centres operated far beyond their intended capacity, and structured support remained minimal after transfer. Large settlements such as Nakivale and Adjumani, each hosting more than 200,000 refugees, were overwhelmed, and education services were deteriorating. Funding gaps made the situation unsustainable, forcing donors and UN agencies to abandon longer-term livelihood and self-reliance goals in favour of basic life-saving assistance.

=== Ethiopia ===
In 2023, more than 75,000 people fled to Ethiopia, including 1,400 Turkish nationals. The country later started receiving up to 3,000 refugees when fighting between the SAF and the SPLM-N (al-Hilu) broke out in June, while 25,000 others were stranded at the Sudanese side of the border by September.

Various Ethiopians who were previously refugees and resided in Sudan moved back to Ethiopia, with reports in August 2024 suggesting that up to 11,771 identified individuals had returned.

=== Other countries ===
About 17,000 people fled to the Central African Republic, while at least 3,500 fled to Libya. About 3,000 people were evacuated to Djibouti.

==== Mediterranean Sea ====
On 5 June 2025, the Madleen, a ship from the Freedom Flotilla, which is a flotilla carrying humanitarian aid to Gaza during the Israel-Hamas conflict, rescued 4 Sudanese refugees who had ended up in the water after jumping from an dinghy carrying other migrants. The Madleen had diverted toward the Libyan coast after receiving a distress call. The four were later transferred to a Frontex vessel and brought to Greece. At the time of their rescue, the flotilla was carrying several prominent members to Gaza including Greta Thunberg, Irish actor Liam Cunningham, and French European Parliament member Rima Hassan.

== Humanitarian conditions for refugees ==
Many of those who have fled, arrived exhausted, traumatised and severely malnourished, often with almost no possessions. Host countries across the region were already struggling with high levels of food insecurity, and the large influx of refugees had pushed local systems to their limits. In several states, cuts to food assistance had left families with extremely limited rations, and in Uganda some refugees were surviving on less than 500 calories per day. Children were at particular risk, with acute malnutrition already above emergency levels in reception centres in Uganda and South Sudan. As of June 2025, without additional resources, hunger and malnutrition among Sudanese refugees across the region were expected to worsen.

Humanitarian needs are widespread across Sudan, but three groups face particularly severe conditions. The first consists of people living in areas of intense fighting, especially in Greater Darfur and Greater Kordofan, where civilians trapped in conflict zones face grave risks to their lives, health and dignity. The second group includes 4.8 million people who have fled to neighbouring countries and nearly eight million who remain displaced inside Sudan, many of whom have been uprooted multiple times as front lines shift and are hosted in communities where basic services are already very limited. The third group is made up of more than 2.2 million people recorded as returnees in 2025, mainly in Khartoum and Al-Jazira, who have gone back to areas heavily damaged by conflict, with almost no functioning services and widespread contamination by explosive remnants of war.

== Challenges ==
Criticism was levelled at diplomatic missions operating in Sudan for their slow response in helping Sudanese visa applicants whose passports were left behind in embassies following their closure during evacuation efforts, preventing them from leaving the country. The latest report issued at the end of 2024 stated that 30.4 million people in Sudan are in need of humanitarian aid.

On 7 May 2023, The Guardian reported that hundreds of Eritrean refugees had been taken away from camps near the Eritrean-Sudanese border. Several Eritrean civilians said the Eritrean Army had taken several civilians back into the country forcefully. Some of those detained were reported to be political refugees who had fled the Afwerki regime and forced conscription in the national army. 95 people were sentenced to prison with severe punishments ahead of them, eight being women.

Ethiopians who fled to Sudan as refugees of the Tigray War would sometimes find themselves victimized again upon arrival, this time by human traffickers. A number of refugees had testified to being kidnapped, regularly tortured, and transported to warehouses in Libya, where many would die due to poor living conditions. This situation worsened further after Sudan itself descended into violence in 2023, placing them at further risk of being kidnapped.

The suspension of USAID funding in 2025 significantly reduced cash assistance, which grassroots emergency response groups relied on to sustain food kitchens. The crisis also impacted neighboring countries, with over two million Sudanese refugees facing deteriorating conditions.

== See also ==
- Battle of Khartoum (2023)
- Battle of Geneina (2023)
- Deportation of Eritreans from Sudan
- El Fasher refugee crisis
- Evacuation of foreign nationals during the war in Sudan (2023)
- Operation Kaveri
