= El Fasher refugee crisis =

Ongoing refugee crisis caused by the El Fasher massacre

- Part of the Sudanese refugee crisis in the outfall of the El Fasher massacre, committed during the Sudanese civil war (2023–present)
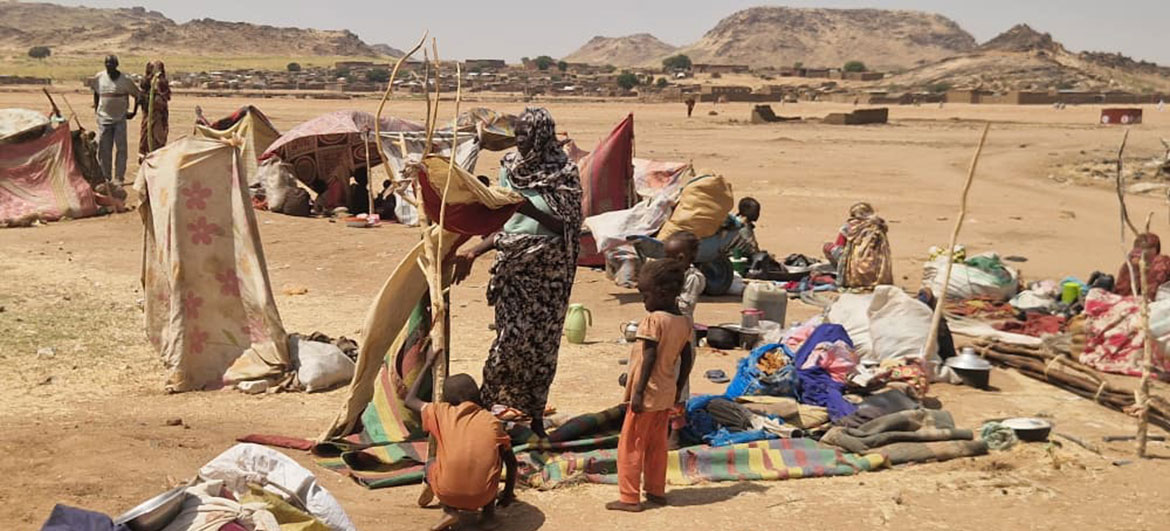
- Internally displaced refugees (IDPs) setting up shelter in Tawila, the largest landing site of IDPs for those fleeing El Fasher.
- Date: 26 October 2025 – present
- Location: Sudan; El Fasher, Tawila, and other surrounding areas; Chad
- Displaced: >100,000 people

The El Fasher refugee crisis is an ongoing crisis in Sudan amid the Sudanese civil war originating from the massacre perpetrated by the Rapid Support Forces (RSF) in the city El Fasher, North Darfur, Sudan. It is estimated that over 100,000 individuals have been displaced, fleeing to nearby villages like Tawila and the neighboring country of Chad.

== Background ==
After an 18-month siege, on 26 October 2025, the RSF captured the city of El Fasher, the largest city in the Darfur region. Reports contained accounts of massacres of unarmed civilian communities and other large-scale atrocities. Systematic killings were committed, including those attempting to flee. In El Fasher, RSF fighters carried out door-to-door raids and executions, and committed acts of sexual violence against women and girls. A report which contained satellite imagery of El Fasher which was analyzed by Yale University's Humanitarian Research Lab (HRL) stated that swaths of civilians had been killed in the Daraja Oula area. The HRL believed "the actions by [the] RSF... may be consistent with war crimes and crimes against humanity (CAH) and may rise to the level of genocide.” According to estimates, the RSF takeover has resulted in over 2,000 civilian deaths, sparking widespread ethnic violence, and deepening the humanitarian crisis. Arab states and human rights groups have condemned these actions.

=== Refugees before the massacre ===
Even prior to the beginning of the massacre, refugees which attempted to flee the city reported paying ransom, encountering RSF patrols, and other violence. Before the fall of El Fasher, Tawila was already a landing ground for many internally displaced persons (IDPs), with Gurni as the first stop along the journey. However, it was largely incapable of tending to its refugee camps as services collapsed and violence grew. The Sudanese American Physicians Association (SAPA) reported that between 18 and 27 October, 3,038 IDPs had fled from El-Fasher to Tawila, with many of them arriving to the town's resources already running thin. This problem was compounded by IDPs arriving with what the SAPA described as "nothing but their lives." The European Commission's Directorate-General for European Civil Protection and Humanitarian Aid Operations (ECHO) estimated that Tawila's population grew from approximately 238,000 to 576,000 between March and September 2025. Médecins Sans Frontières reported that of arrivals to the Tawila refugee camp during the week prior to the fall of city, 5% of children were acutely malnourished, and 26% were severely malnourished. The SAPA warned that Sudan's looming rainy season could constrain aid efforts and intensify the spread of diseases like cholera.

== Refugee crisis ==
=== 26 October – 1 November ===
The UN estimated that more than 26,000 people had fled the city in a couple days after the beginning of the massacre, mostly towards the neighboring town of Tawila, where refugee camps were established. The SAPA recorded 3,000 IDP arrivals on 26 October, 26,030 on 27 October, and 7,455 on 28 October. Many of the children which arrived were separated or unaccompanied, believing their parents to have gone missing, been detained, or killed. Several centers for displaced people, including the Dar al-Arqam displacement center at Omdurman Islamic University, were attacked. Reports further claim that in a single incident, more than 60 people were killed, including 22 women and 17 children.

By 29 October, the IOM revised earlier figures from ECHO, reporting that between March and September 2025, Tawila's IDP population had grown from 238,084 to 652,079, which amounted to 37% of all IDPs across North Darfur and 7% across all of Sudan. 57% of all individuals in all of Tawila were children under 18 years old. IOM found that 74% of displaced households in Tawila were living in informal settlements or gathering sites. Of both formal and informal settlement, 43% were damaged or collapsed. Much of this damage was to roofs, which made shelters prone to leaking when it rained, which were problems the IOM believed would be exacerbated due to growing winter conditions. Other shelter issues included significant overcrowding, which contributed to limited or poor sleeping areas and lack of storage space. 70% of households had required healthcare within the last three months, although half did not receive it.

=== 2 November – 9 November ===
By 4 November, the United Nations High Commissioner for Refugees (UNHCR) suspected that "many others" were still "trapped in the city without food, water and medical care." It stated that it was providing assistance to refugees which had arrived in Tawila. Furthermore, it had household-item aid kits prepared for distribution in Nyala, awaiting safe access into El Fasher, which was still blockaded at the time. The International Committee of the Red Cross (ICRC) reported the same day that over 445,000 had been displaced across Sudan in 2025 alone. It claimed that the situation seemed uncertain for refugees with "aid funding sharply declining and essential services stretched to breaking point."

On 5 November, officials reported that "an unknown number of women were abducted on the way from el-Fasher to Tawila," many of which were raped and tortured. 25 cases of sexual violence were documented, but officials said this figure was already likely "much higher" as they could not reach victims for testimony. Victims and eyewitnesses corroborated stories of RSF fighters systematically stripping and looting civilians.

Being present in Sudan since April 2023, the United Nations Children's Fund (UNICEF)'s Logistics Officer for Sudan, Shoshat Osman, noted on 7 November that aid delivery often had "a very narrow window." He added that "we [UNICEF] succeed some days, and other days we don't"—the success rate of which was compounded by the difficulty to remain "neutral and impartial." Its Director of Emergency Operations, Lucia Elmi, expressed the life-saving capability of delivering "therapeutic food, safe water and essential medicines and health services," especially amidst worsening food insecurity causing famine; access to bed nets, safe water, and vaccines; and other health services which can slow of halt prevalent diseases like cholera and malaria.

=== 10 November – 16 November ===
By 11 November, UN Women's Regional Director for East and Southern Africa, Anna Mutavati, said that the refugee crisis worsened as fighting around the city continued. Some also fled to the neighboring towns of Korma and Malit, where Mutavati categorized the aid presence as "scarce." Tens of thousands of arrivals have led to overcrowding in refugee camps. The IOM said that ground assaults and heavy shelling in the weeks since the massacre began displaced approximately 90,000. Tens of thousand remained trapped within the city, with the IOM reporting that hospitals, markets, and water systems collapsed. The IOM claimed that the humanitarian situation was "on the brink of collapse," with aid resources depleted despite local organizations starting emergency projects to provide "shelter kits, protection assistance, and health services," and improve "access to water, sanitation, and hygiene."

By 14 November, the UNHCR estimated the refugee figures was nearing 100,000, with Tawila as the largest destination for incoming civilians. By 16 November, the SAPA underscores that key urgent needs were not being met. This included shelter, food, water, medical care, and protection. In addition, conflict in and around El Fasher made it difficult for aid groups to access those in need or coordinate between one another.

=== 17 November – 23 November ===
By 22 November, UNICEF recorded the arrival of 354 children unaccompanied by any immediate family members to the refugee camps in Tawila, being able to reunite 84 children with their families. UNICEF noted that this success could be attributed, in part, to the presence of numerous aid organizations in Tawila.

The Norwegian Refugee Council (NRC) recorded upwards of 400 children unaccompanied by any immediate family members, with many being in the care of "extended relatives, neighbors and strangers who didn’t want to leave them alone in the desert or el-Fasher [El Fasher]." According to the NRC's advocacy manager, Mathilde Vu, "many children arrived with clear signs of hunger," noting their skinny, bony, and dehydrated appearance.

=== 24 November – 30 November ===
On 26 November, testimonies of IDPs fleeing El Fasher recounted RSF fighters forcing syringes into their arms to extract blood. This was corroborated by numerous victims, eyewitnesses, aid workers, and diplomatic sources. Some were kept in makeshift blood banks for approximately a week where blood would be drawn multiple times. Eyewitnesses recounted these clinics being filled with victims and containers full of blood. Alaaeldin Nugud, spokesperson for the RSF's political arm, denied reports of blood extraction and organ harvesting. Others had their blood drawn directly on roads where they were detained. RSF fighters restrained victims with ropes and had small ambulance-like units, protected by military vehicles, to store the blood. Fleeing and released victims were left in a weakened state due to the intense blood draws. It was speculated that blood was being drawn for the RSF's injured fighters.

By 27 November, the NRC registered upwards of 15,000 new arrivals in Tawila since the beginning of the massacre. The NRC noted that of these arrivals, an average of 200 or more children were registered every day. One teacher with the NRC noted children showed "signs of acute trauma" as they struggled with speaking, had nightmares, and described hours of traumatic, chaotic travel fleeing the city.

On 28 November, a victim from the massacre staying in a UNHCR refugee camp in Chad told Al Jazeera that he was digging holes to make money. Despite having watched his father die in El Fasher before fleeing, in addition to his uncle and brother going missing, the victim said the money was necessary to provide for his "big family." The UN Resident and Humanitarian Coordinator in Sudan, Denise Brown, which travelled to Darfur with Thomas Fletcher, the UN's Under-Secretary-General for Humanitarian Affairs, continued to express that aid organizations still did not "have enough of anything." Brown argued countries and donors' lack of funding created the "yawning shortfall," especially considering the UN, as "one of the best funded humanitarian responses in the world," was only at 28% of the funding it needed. Brown said that while money was not the only resource needed, especially considering the need for psychological support for women who had suffered sexual violence, it was "surely going to help our humanitarian response." For aid to successfully be delivered, Brown, like Fletcher, argued that aid organizations needed safe, non-militarized access.

On 30 November, witnesses recounted needing to leave behind children which were abducted or the dead bodies of relatives which died along the way. They arrived to refugee camps virtually empty-handed as RSF fighters as checkpoints stripped individuals of their money, phones, and clothes; ransom collected through video calls occurred numerous times at each of those checkpoints.

=== 1 December – 7 December ===
The local humanitarian group, Malam Darfur Peace and Development, delivered the first round of aid after gaining entry from the RSF on one undisclosed date. Its president, Lukman Ahmed, negotiated with the RSF hoping to keep food aid entering the city in the future. However, El Fasher and routes thereout remained dangerous with robberies, looting, and sexual violence continuing. Ransom remained absurdly high. Escaping from the city was littered with unexploded ordinances including landmines, which made travel even more difficult. Camps had an accumulating number of individuals without medicine, water, or even shelter. Some were seen sleeping in the open.

On 5 December, the UN World Food Programme (WFP) announced ration reductions across the entire country amid funding shortages. It said that beginning in January 2026, ration would be cut to 70% of its usual levels in famine-stricken areas and 50% for those at risk thereof. Despite being "the absolute minimum for survival," the WFP said it only had enough resourced for four-months-supply of aid. This was exacerbated by the fact that it had no humanitarian partners nor reported operating community kitchens.

=== 8 December – 14 December ===
Malam Darfur Peace and Development delivered its second round of aid on 11 December, which it said fed 1,200 families. It noted a scarcity of medical services and water access "particularly for the many injured, elderly and ill individuals requiring immediate attention." The group hoped its success would draw other groups to aid in deliveries. That day, the WFP negotiated with the RSF, setting "minimum conditions to enter the city." Believing it could enter "very soon," "initial assessments and reconnaissance" needed to be done with the 18-month siege prior to the attack leaving "the essentials for survival... completely obliterated." It announced it had, by then, set food and trucks in place in preparation to deploy aid within a moment's notice. The blackout continued to limit all humanitarian groups' access.

On 12 December, over 100 to 110 tons of aid sent by the European Union were received by aid organizations in Darfur. Aid included shelter materials; water, sanitation and hygiene supplies (WASH); and medical items. (Note: Multiple sources announced the project:) It was sourced from the EU stockpiles and partners. The same day, it announced it had planned seven more flights throughout December and then January 2026, belonging to a renewed operations of the Directorate-General for European Civil Protection and Humanitarian Aid Operations' (DG ECHO) humanitarian "Air Bridge," which had been flying aid since the outbreak of the civil war in April 2023. The operation would be sending €3.5 million in aid as part of the new operation, adding to the EU's €270 million in humanitarian aid to Sudan in 2025 alone. It was DG ECHO's largest humanitarian effort in Africa and the new deliveries made it one of the largest contributors to response efforts at the time.

=== 22 December – 28 December ===
On 23 December, an aid worker in Al Dabba recounted the refugee camp's population growing from 2,000 to over 10,000 in the first two weeks following the massacre. They noted that food, water, medication, and latrines were all in shortage. They recounted the arrival of pregnant minors that were victim to rape. IDPs recounted family members being shot during their journey or killed in accidents along the way. Some succumbed to illnesses exacerbated by malnutrition while others arrived to the camps with them.

=== 29 December–present ===
Figures of over 100,000 displaced residents remained. The UN announced having first been given access to the city on 29 December, reporting "very few" signs of life. Villages on the periphery were largely "deserted." Those remaining, being visibly fatigued, lived in empty homes and rudimentary plastic-sheet shelters. A small market remained, stocked with local vegetable produce. Despite having no supplies, the Saudi Hospital had some medical personnel. The same day, UNICEF warned of an "unprecedented level" of malnutrition among children in North Darfur. Refugees continued to make the journey out of the city, noting continued ransom requests, blood extraction, and other violence.

== Further killings ==
Many could not escape as the city was surrounded by RSF's 56-kilometer blockade, which was used during the siege. Aid groups said there were no safe routes for civilians. Videos show scores of massacred civilians around the sand berm and inside its ditches. On 5 November, eyewitnesses recounted the western gate, which led out of the city to the RSF-designated collection point for fleeing civilians of Gurney and Tawila further down the line, being lined with bodies. Many were killed by the RSF's constructed perimeter, with bodies filling the trenches adjacent to the berm. Witnesses recounted dead bodies being left out unburied for two to three days or more.

Civilians which managed to escape the perimeter, sometimes an estimated 20 km out from the city, were stopped by RSF soldiers in vehicles. Testimonies recounted RSF militants having killed the elderly, sick, and wounded, noting that they had lamented needing to bring them in the back of their pickup trucks and choosing to execute them instead. People who attempted to flee were reportedly kidnapped with ransoms demanded for release. For weeks, dozens of civilians coming from El Fasher and arriving in Tawila were seriously wounded.
