= Invasion of Ethiopia =

Invasion of Ethiopia and Conquest of Ethiopia (or Invasion of Abyssinia and Conquest of Abyssinia) may refer to:

- Battle of Gomit; Adal invasion of Ethiopia (1445)
- Ethiopian–Adal War (1529–1543)
- Ottoman conquest of Habesh (1557–1589)
- British expedition to Abyssinia (1867–1868)
- Egyptian–Ethiopian War (1874–1876)
- Italo-Ethiopian War of 1887–1889
- First Italo-Ethiopian War (1895–1896)
- Second Italo-Ethiopian War (1935–1937)
  - De Bono's invasion of Ethiopia (1935)
- Somali invasion of Ogaden (1977)
- Eritrean invasion of Ethiopia (1998)
- Al-Shabaab invasion of Ethiopia (2022)
