= Deportation of Eritreans from Sudan =

Ethnic deportation of Eritreans in the Sudan

Deportation of Eritreans in Sudan
- Part of the War in Sudan (2023)
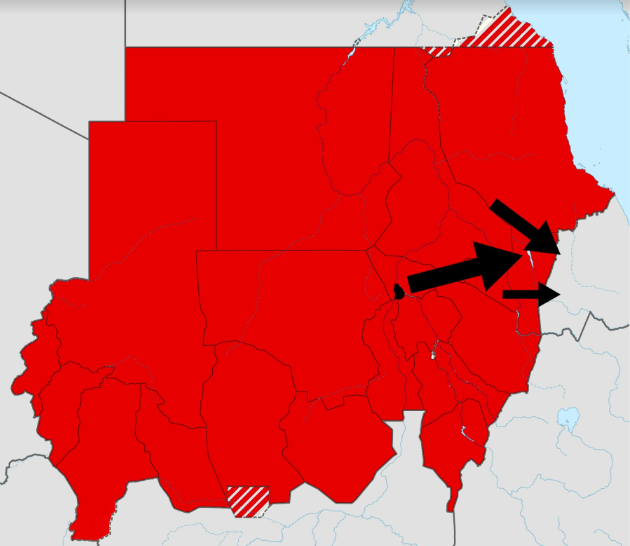
- Map of the deportation of Eritreans from Sudan from several Sudanese cities to the border towns of the Sudanese-Eritrean border. Eritrea in the far end of the map
- Location: Eritrean-Sudanese border
- Date: April-May 2023
- Target: Eritreans and Sudanese-Eritreans
- Attack type: Forcible displacement
- Deaths: At least 9 Eritreans killed in the Battle of Khartoum).
- Perpetrators: Eritrean government and Eritrean army

The deportation of Eritreans from Sudan (Tigrinya: ኣብ ሱዳን ኣብ እተገብረ ውግእ ኤርትራስ ካብ ሱዳን ምጥራዝ; Arabic: ترحيل الإريتريين من السودان خلال نزاع السودان) was the forced transfer of hundreds, possibly more than 3,500 Eritreans, mainly at the border between the two countries in 2023, after the start of the ongoing war in Sudan.

During conflicts, such as the series of Eritrean-Ethiopian clashes since Eritrea's invasion of Ethiopia in 1998, a significant number of migrants from Eritrea sought refuge in Sudan for safety. As a result, Sudan has accumulated a population of around 126,000 Eritrean migrants and Sudanese-Eritreans, with over 75,000 in the Sudanese capital, Khartoum.

== Background ==
By the end of 1993, shortly after Eritrea's independence from Ethiopia, Eritrea charged Sudan with supporting the activities of Eritrean Islamic Jihad, which carried out attacks against the Eritrean government. Eritrea broke relations with Sudan at the end of 1994, became a strong supporter of the Sudan People's Liberation Movement/Sudan People's Liberation Army (SPLA), and permitted the opposition National Democratic Alliance to locate its headquarters in the former Sudan embassy in Asmara. At the urging of the United States, Ethiopia and Eritrea joined Uganda in the so-called Front Line States strategy, which was designed to put military pressure on the Sudanese government.

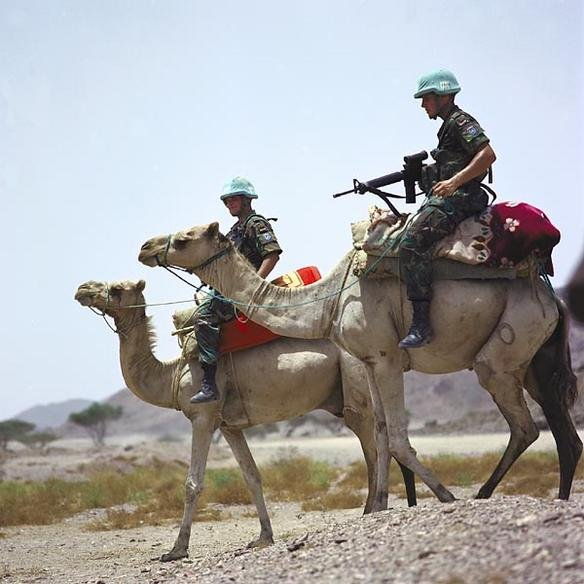
UN soldiers in Eritrea during the border conflict

On 6 May 1998, border clashes erupted between Ethiopia and Eritrea in the then-disputed border town of Badme, that was Ethiopian-administered. A large Eritrean mechanised force entered the town, and engaged in fighting with Ethiopian forces, including Tigrayan militia and security police, resulting in the deaths of several Eritrean officials. According to a 2005 ruling by the Permanent Court of Arbitration, Eritrea triggered the war by invading Ethiopia.

This surprise Eritrean invasion significantly changed the political situation in the wider region. Ethiopia moved to normalize relations with Sudan by the end of 1998, reflecting a shift in alliances driven by their shared opposition to Eritrea. In 2000, Eritrea also restored diplomatic ties with Sudan. However, relations between Sudan and Eritrea soon deteriorated again. In 2002, Sudan closed its border with Eritrea, and in February 2003 the Sudanese foreign minister accused Eritrea of deploying forces along the Sudan–Eritrea border. The Sudanese government also accused Eritrea of supporting rebel groups in Darfur. The undemarcated border with Sudan also posed a problem for Eritrean external relations.

After periods of rapprochement marked by mediation efforts and border reopenings in the mid-2000s and again after political changes in Sudan in 2019, relations deteriorated and stabilised repeatedly, with Eritrea aligning with Sudan’s army during the civil war that began in April 2023, reflecting president Isaias Afwerki’s long-standing strategy of flexible, interest-driven alliances rather than durable partnerships.

=== Migrant crisis ===
On 23 May 2000, Sudan reported that over 100,000 Eritreans had crossed the border into the country, most in dire conditions. Sudan, struggling to cope with more than four million refugees or displaced people, has appealed for international help to deal with the new inflow of Eritreans, who have joined about 160,000 Eritrean refugees already living in Sudan. The independent al-Ayam daily said food had reached refugees at only one camp, at al-Lafa, which also received 820 tents. It reported three deaths among the refugees, but it was not clear if these were among the seven reported by state television. It quoted Abdalla Ahmed, head of a government refugee committee, as saying some refugees had been diagnosed with malaria or chest infections, but there were no epidemics and the refugees had been immunised against meningitis and measles. The U.N. World Food Programme has said it has distributed wheat flour, oil and onions to about 3,500 Eritrean refugees. Ethiopia has made huge advances into western Eritrea over the past 12 days and both sides pounded each other on a key central front on Tuesday, despite diplomatic peace efforts.

== Conflict in Sudan (2023–present) ==
The 2023 Sudanese conflict began on 15 April 2023, when forces loyal to the Rapid Support Forces launched coordinated attacks on key government and military sites in Khartoum, primarily the Khartoum International Airport. While the international airport was captured by the RSF, street battles continued throughout Khartoum and the neighboring cities of Omdurman and Bahri. The RSF also captured the presidential palace, the residence of the former Sudanese president Omar al-Bashir, and attacked a military base. Users on Facebook Live and Twitter documented the Sudanese Air Force flying above the city, and striking the RSF targets.

=== Eritreans in Khartoum ===
Before the conflict, Sudan was hosting an estimated 126,000 Eritreans, including about 75,000 living in and around Khartoum, as well as a significant population in Kassala, the region along the border with Eritrea. The UN Special Rapporteur on the situation of human rights in Eritrea reported that hundreds of Eritreans were arbitrarily arrested and detained between April 2022 and April 2023, prior to the outbreak of the current conflict. From August 2022 to March 2023, Sudanese security services intensified immigration control operations in Khartoum, targeting Eritrean refugees through raids and detentions for lacking identification documents, residence permits or authorisation to travel outside refugee camps in eastern Sudan. These practices reportedly created a climate of fear among Eritrean refugees in the capital, with many going into hiding and avoiding leaving their homes.

== Deportations ==
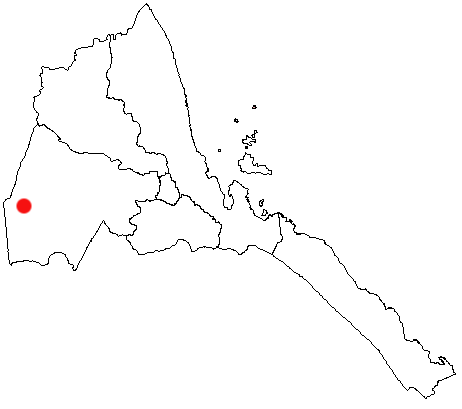
Location of Teseney (near the border with Sudan), where hundreds of the deportation buses were sent to.

On 7 May 2023, an Eritrean human rights activist said that more than an estimated 3,500 Eritreans and Sudanese-Eritreans from Sudan had been taken away from their refugee camps near the Eritrean-Sudanese border. Several of the citizens being deported were reported to be Eritrean men who had fled the Eritrean army after being conscripted. He said that the Eritrean army had forcibly returned several civilians to Eritrea, to the border town of Teseney. Some of those detained were activists who had fled the dictatorship of Isaias Afwerki.

Also in May 2023, Eritreans were reported to have disappeared while travelling toward Kassala, prompting fears that they may have been captured either by the Eritrean government or by human traffickers after fleeing fighting between the Sudanese army and the paramilitary Rapid Support Forces. With UNHCR assistance largely confined to camps in Kassala, many Eritreans were forced to choose between remaining in areas where they risked abduction in order to access aid or relocating to places where assistance was unavailable.

On 13 July 2023, UN experts condemned Ethiopia’s summary expulsion of hundreds of Eritreans in late June, reporting cases of family separation in which parents were forced back to Eritrea while children remained in Ethiopia. The experts stated that there was no information on the fate or whereabouts of those returned and noted extensive evidence of serious human rights violations against forcibly returned Eritreans, including torture, enforced disappearance, trafficking and arbitrary detention.

=== Detention ===
The Eritrean human rights activist added that 95 people were sent to prison forcefully, including eight women, and he expressed fear about their fate.

== See also ==
- Battle of Khartoum (2023)
- Eritrea–Sudan relations
- Human rights in Eritrea
- Humanitarian impact of the war in Sudan (2023)
- Refoulement of Eritrean refugees during the Tigray War
- Refugee kidnappings in Sinai
