= Mohamed Salih Omer =

Sudanese politician (1934–1969)

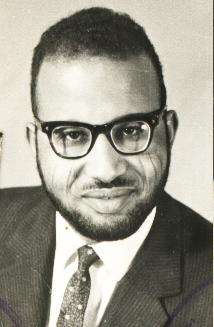
Mohamed Salih Omer

Mohamed Salih Omer (Arabic: محمد صالح عمر; 1934–1969) was a Sudanese politician.

Omer was born in Badien Island in 1934. His father was Sheikh Omer Mohamed Al Amein and his mother was Farhein Seid Ahmed Haj. He attended Badein Primary school, Algolid Intermediate School, and Wadi Seidna Boy's Secondary School (1st Grade March 1955, index No. 358). He graduated from the Faculty of Law (Sharia) of the University of Khartoum on April 1, 1959 (second class upper). He received his master's degree of Law from the School of Oriental and African Studies, University of London on 24 October 1961.

He joined the Muslim Brotherhood while at secondary school. He was selected as a Minister of Animal Resources in the Ministry of Sirr Al-Khatim Al-Khalifa after the October Revolution in 1964, representing the Islamic Charter Front. In 1969 he joined the Palestinian Resistance movement Fatah. When the Communist Party came to power in Sudan under Jaafar Nimeiry in May 1969, he returned to Sudan to participate in the Sudanese National Front, and joined Immam Alhadi Almahdi on Aba Island to fight the communists. He was killed on Aba Island (Aljazeera Aba) during an armed confrontation with Nimeiry's army in 1969.
