= Extreme points of Sudan =

This is a list of the extreme points of Sudan, the points that are farther north, south, east or west than any other location.

- Northernmost point – an unnamed headland in the Wadi Halfa Salient, Northern wilayat
- Easternmost point – Ghab Miyun island, Suakin archipelago, Red Sea wilayat
- Easternmost point (mainland) – Ras Kasar, Red Sea wilayat
- Southernmost point – Excluding both the disputed Abyei and Kafia Kingi regions, it is at 9°29'20"N 26°42'11"E (the southernmost point of Southern Darfur near the Bahr el Arab west of Abyei)
- Westernmost point – unnamed location on the border with Chad in the Wadi Kadja immediately east of the Chadian village of Bir Kandji, West Darfur wilayat
- Highest point – Deriba Caldera, 3,042 m (9,980 ft)
- Lowest point – Red Sea, 0 m
- Note: Sudan claims, but does not control, the Hala'ib triangle which is under Egyptian rule. If this area is included, then Sudan's northernmost point is the point at which the Egyptian border enters the Red Sea on the mainland or, including islands, the eastern headland of Mirear Island.
