= Sudanese cholera epidemic (2024–present) =

Sudan cholera epidemic
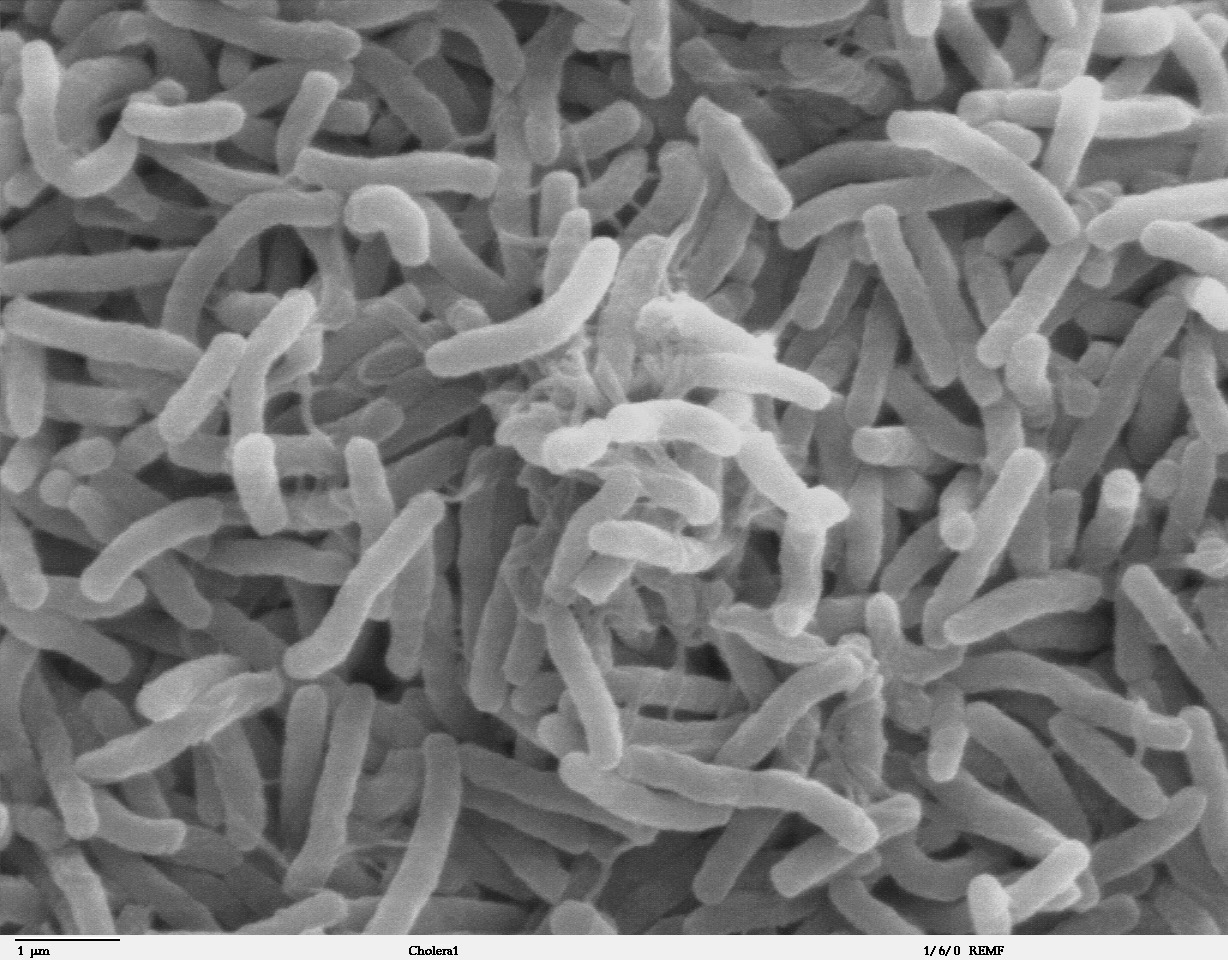
- Image of cholera under a microscope
- Disease: Cholera
- Pathogen: Vibrio cholerae
- Location: Sudan, Chad, Nigeria, Democratic Republic of the Congo, and South Sudan
- Date: 2024–present
- Confirmed cases: 781,351
- Deaths: 12,163

Since 2024, Sudan has been experiencing an epidemic of cholera that has also spread to neighbouring Chad and South Sudan. It is reportedly the nation's worst cholera outbreak in years. UNICEF has reported the epidemic is being exacerbated by the Sudanese civil war. Khartoum, North Kordofan, White Nile and Darfur were among the hardest-hit areas. The cholera epidemic in Sudan is part of a wider outbreak; as of 31 August 2025, 462,890 cases and 5,869 deaths had been reported from 32 countries across five WHO regions. By December 2025, Sudan and Chad had recorded 127,248 suspected cholera cases and 3,522 deaths across all 23 states. By August 2026, 191,213 cholera cases and 2,772 deaths across all 61 counties in Sudan, Chad, and South Sudan.

== Background ==
Cholera is a disease resulting from a bacterial infection and most often transmitted through polluted water. The illness leads to intense diarrhoea and rapid loss of fluids. Without timely treatment it can be fatal within a few hours, even in people who were in good health beforehand. Cholera has a long history in Sudan, with repeated outbreaks linked to conflict, environmental conditions and insufficient WASH and health infrastructure.

The war in Sudan created conditions that allowed the disease to spread quickly. Water and sewage systems have been damaged or destroyed, and many medical facilities have been closed due to a lack of supplies. By November 2025, more than 11.7 million people have been displaced, including around 7.26 million people within Sudan, forcing many into overcrowded areas with very poor sanitation. Limited access to clean water, open defecation and poor waste management make faecal contamination of water supplies common, enabling the bacteria to circulate rapidly. The heavy rain season in 2025 further worsened conditions by flooding roads, slowing aid deliveries and leaving communities without clean water. These combined factors created an environment in which cholera could move rapidly through the population.

Surveillance of the epidemic was hindered by security constraints and limited access, which also disrupted vaccine delivery and routine immunisation. Cholera vaccines provided temporary protection during the outbreak but could not address the underlying drivers of transmission, and were intended mainly to buy time while improvements to water and sanitation systems were pursued.

== History ==
In August 2023, three suspected cholera cases were detected in Al Qadarif State in Sudan, but financial constraints and a concurrent dengue outbreak hindered a proper response.

In August 2024, cholera was declared in Al Qadarif, Kassala and River Nile states. By mid-December, more than 47,000 cases had been recorded across 81 localities in 11 of Sudan’s 18 states, with about 1,235 deaths and a case fatality rate of 2.6 percent, well above the WHO benchmark of under 1 percent. Because access to many areas is limited and reporting is constrained, actual numbers are believed to be higher, with reduced community referrals further contributing to undercounting.

In October 2024, a cholera outbreak was declared in South Sudan, with the epidemic centred in Khartoum. As of August 2025, Khartoum State continued to be the most affected area, yet the epidemic had spread throughout Sudan's refugee camps, and vaccination programmes had been rolled out.

In October 2025, CARE International reported that Sudan’s cholera outbreak was accelerating, with infection and fatality rates that far exceeded the emergency threshold. (Note: The emergency threshold is the mortality rate above which an emergency is said to be occurring. The emergency threshold for cholera is less than 1%.) The organization noted that the collapse of health services had left more than three-quarters of facilities destroyed, severely limiting the response capacity. Shortages of medical supplies, chlorine and clean water, combined with insecurity and insufficient funding, further deepened the crisis as the rainy season continued.

Cholera infections were highest among young adults and adolescents, with the 20–29 age group reporting the greatest number of infections, followed by those aged 10–19. Fatalities, however, were concentrated at both ends of the age spectrum: people aged 70 and above recorded the most deaths, closely followed by children under five. There was no notable disparity between male and female cases or deaths. Malnourished children, especially those with severe acute malnutrition, faced a much higher risk of serious complications from cholera.

By October 2025, the outbreak in South Sudan had become the worst in the country’s history, with 95,450 reported cases and 1,587 deaths, resulting in a case fatality rate of 1.7%.

By November 2025, Sudan had recorded 124,269 suspected cholera cases and 3,355 deaths across all 18 states. Of these, 71,373 suspected cases and 1,996 deaths were reported in 2025, the highest numbers in Africa during that period. Khartoum, North Kordofan, White Nile and Darfur were among the hardest-hit areas. Although case numbers had fallen by about 44 percent over the previous four weeks, overall vulnerability remained high because of the ongoing conflict and collapsed infrastructure.

The funding cuts by USAID starting in 2025 weakened the cholera response in South Sudan during the ongoing epidemic. They led to disrupted surveillance, the rationing of treatment, and the loss of essential services in affected communities. According to humanitarian and former US officials, these reductions coincided with a reversal of declining case trends and contributed to a renewed surge in cholera cases and preventable deaths.

On 17 June 2026, the TASIS-aligned Peace Government officially declared a cholera outbreak in the Kordofan region, with laboratory tests in South Sudan confirming the disease, after weeks of acute watery diarrhoea cases in West Kordofan. Later in June, on 29 June, the Sudanese health ministry and World Health Organization chief Tedros Adhanom Ghebreyesus declared a new cholera outbreak in West Kordofan state, four months after declaring an end to a previous outbreak that started in July 2024.

== Effect on health care ==
By January 2025, the cholera epidemic had placed an additional burden on Sudan’s wider humanitarian response, overwhelming a health system already strained by increasing child malnutrition, war injuries and other preventable diseases. The outbreak led health actors to redirect limited medical resources toward cholera treatment, reducing the capacity to address illnesses such as malaria and dengue fever, which continued to pose major risks. Response efforts were further hampered by the deterioration and understaffing of health facilities in conflict-affected areas, as well as by critical shortages of cholera kits and rehydration supplies.

== See also ==
- Sudanese refugee crisis
- Humanitarian impact of the Sudanese civil war (2023–present)
