= Badien Island =

Island in Sudan

Coordinates: 19.654566°N 30.387227°E

Badien Island (also spelled Jazeerat Dadeen) is one of the largest islands on the Nile and the second biggest island in Sudan. The island is 21 km (13 mi) in length and 7 km (4.3 mi) in width. It is located 56 km (35 mi) north of Dongola, the capital of the Northern state, Sudan.

== Demographics and culture ==
Badien Island is home to approximately 40,000 people, all of whom are Nubians. The island's inhabitants speak two Nubian languages: Nobiin (also known as Mahasi or Halfawai) and Andaandi (also called Dongolawi).

== Administration ==
The island is divided into four administrative districts: north, south, east, and west.

== Economy ==
The main industry on Badien Island is agriculture. Farmers on the island cultivate various crops, including wheat and beans. In 2005, the island obtained an electricity grid, which significantly improved the efficiency of agricultural operations.

== See also ==
- Geography of Sudan
- List of islands of Sudan
