= Suakin Archipelago National Park =

Archipelago of Sudan

- IUCN category II (national park)
- Location within Sudan
- Location: Red Sea, Sudan
- Nearest city: Suakin
- Coordinates: 18°44′19″N 38°29′17″E
- Area: 1,500 km^{2} (580 sq mi)
- World Heritage site: link

The Suakin Archipelago is a large group of islets found in Sudan in the Red Sea, which has been proposed for IUCN category II, national park. This site covers an area of about 1,500 square kilometres (580 sq mi).

== Important Bird Area ==
The archipelago has been designated an Important Bird Area (IBA) by BirdLife International because it supports significant breeding colonies of lesser and greater crested terns. Sea turtles and dugongs inhabit the waters.
