= Ras Kasar =

Cape in Eritrea and Sudan

Ras Kasar (Eritrea)
Ras Kasar (Sudan)

Ras Kasar is a cape in northeastern Africa, on the border between Eritrea and Sudan at the Red Sea. It is the northernmost point in Eritrea and the easternmost point in Sudan.
