= Eritrean Islamic Jihad =

Political party in Eritrea

- Jihadist flag
- Other name: Eritrean Islamic Salvation Movement; EIJM; EIJ; ERIJ; EISM; Eritrean Islamic Jihad Movement; Harakat al Jihad al Islami al Eritrea
- Ideology: Islamism; Salafi jihadism

Eritrean Islamic Jihad (Note: Arabic: حركة الجهاد الإسلامي الإريتري, romanized: Harakat al Jihad al Islami al Eritrea) (EISM), also known as the Eritrean Islamic Salvation Movement (Note: Arabic: حركة الخلاص الإسلامي الإريتري, romanized: Harakat al Khalas al Islami al Eritrea) (ERIJ), is an Eritrean Islamist organization and one of several opposition groups that operates in Eritrea and from surrounding countries.

== Goals and objectives ==
The primary goal of the ERIJ is to spread the Islamic ideology and the rule by Islamic law -Sharia and overthrow of the Eritrean government of President Isaias Afewerki, and his ruling People's Front for Democracy and Justice (PFDJ), formerly referred to as the Eritrean People's Liberation Front (EPLF). The PFDJ is the only legally permitted political party in Eritrea. ERIJ also seeks the establishment of an Islamic Government in Eritrea with an eye toward establishing a caliphate in the Horn of Africa. In September 1998, an opposition congress was held in Khartoum, Sudan. At that time, the Eritrean opposition group Harakat al Jihad al Islami (Eritrean Islamic Jihad Movement-ERIJ) reportedly changed its name to Harakat al Khalas al Islami al Eritrea (Eritrean Islamic Salvation Movement).

== Leadership ==
Shaikh Khalil Mohammed Amer is the putative leader of ERIJ. ERIJ's Deputy Emir is Abul Bara' Hassan Salman.

== Foreign support ==
Sudanese authorities have signaled their official support of the movement when they allowed the ERIJ's Secretary-General Sheikh Khalil Mohammed Amer to hold a news conference in Khartoum.

== History of attacks ==
- April 12, 2003: Timothy Nutt, a 49-year-old British geologist was murdered in western Eritrea allegedly by ERIJ. ERIJ denied responsibility for the attack. Nutt's throat was cut and his vehicle had been burned. His body was found in a dry stream-bed near the village of Bisha. Nutt reportedly worked for the Canadian firm Nevsun Resources, a mineral exploration company specialising in gold and diamond mining.
- August 10, 2003: Two aid workers were killed and another injured when their vehicle was attacked by gunmen in Northern Eritrea. The victims worked for Mercy Corps, a US charity, which has long had a presence in the region. Although no group claimed the attack, Eritrean authorities suspect Eritrean Islamic Jihad Movement (ERIJ) which is supported by Sudan.
