= 1998 Eritrean invasion of Ethiopia =

Beginning of the Eritrean–Ethiopian War

Eritrean invasion of Ethiopia
- Part of the Eritrean–Ethiopian War
Date	6 May – 17 June 1998
Location	Eritrea–Ethiopia border
Result	Beginning of the Eritrean–Ethiopian War; Eritrean victory

Belligerents
Ethiopia	Eritrea

Commanders and leaders
(Ethiopia) Tsadkan Gebretensae (Ethiopia) Samora Yunis	(Eritrea) Sebhat Ephrem (Eritrea) Filipos Woldeyohannes

Strength
Unknown	Unknown

Casualties and losses
About 600 soldiers and civilians killed; 300,000 refugees (estimates by Mikhailo Zhirokhov)	Unknown

On 6 May 1998, Eritrea invaded neighbouring Ethiopia, marking the beginning of the Eritrean–Ethiopian War. The invasion was declared illegal by an international commission in The Hague.

== Invasion ==
After a series of armed incidents in which several Eritrean officials were killed near Badme, on 6 May 1998, a large Eritrean mechanized force entered the Badme region along the border of Eritrea and Ethiopia's northern Tigray Region, resulting in a firefight between the Eritrean soldiers and a Tigrayan militia and the Ethiopian police they encountered.

The fighting quickly escalated to exchanges of artillery and tank fire, leading to four weeks of intense fighting. Ground troops fought on three fronts. On 5 June 1998, the Eritrean airforce attacked an elementary school in Mekelle that killed 49 of the students and their parents and the neighbors that came to help immediately. Four more people died after reaching hospital. The victims ranged from a three-month-old baby to a 65-year-old man. On 5 June the Ethiopian Air Force launched air attacks on the airport in Asmara as a retaliation. After that on the same date Eritreans also attacked the airport of Mekele. These raids caused civilian casualties and deaths on both sides of the border.

There was then a lull as both sides mobilized huge forces along their common border and dug extensive trenches. Both countries spent several hundred million dollars on new military equipment.

== Reaction ==
The Council of Ministers of Ethiopia demanded the immediate withdrawal of the Eritrean army from the occupied territory. The Cabinet of Ministers of Eritrea, in turn, accused the Ethiopians of violating the border. President Isaias Afwerki said that the withdrawal of troops from the occupied territories "seems morally unacceptable and physically impossible".

Rwanda, the United States and Djibouti made attempts to bring the parties to the negotiating table.

The United Nations Security Council adopted Resolution 1177 condemning the use of force and welcomed statements from both sides to end the air strikes.

== Results ==
As a result of the campaign, three fronts were formed: the western one — the Badme section, the area between the Mereb and Setit rivers, the central one — the Cherona—Zalambesa —Alitena district, the eastern one — the Bure district.

The war lasted until 2000. At the end of the conflict, the parties agreed to resolve all their disputes through international arbitration.

== Evaluation of arbitration ==
In 2005, the Claims Commission – that was set up as part of the peace agreement – said that settling such disputes by use of force could not be considered self-defence. Since there was no armed attack against Eritrea, its attack on Ethiopia could not be justified as lawful self-defence under the United Nations charter .Eritrea is now liable to compensate Ethiopia for damages caused, it said. Tensions over the border have risen in recent months with both countries sending more troops there.
