= Timeline of the Tigray war =

Chronological aspect of the Tigray War

This timeline of the Tigray War is part of a chronology of the military engagements of the Tigray War, a civil war that began in the Tigray Region of Ethiopia in early November 2020.

== Pre-war preparations ==
=== Tigray ===
In 2018, Ethiopia's ruling coalition(EPRDF), which includes TPLF among four other parties, elected Abiy Ahmed as its new chairman, filling the gap that had been left when Hailemariam Desalegn of the SEPDM announced his resignation. After being sidelined by Abiy, TPLF leaders retreated to their home region in northern Ethiopia.

Not only the TPLF, but even the Tigray branch of Abiy's own Prosperity Party expressed fears about an Eritrean invasion, already on 19 February 2020. On 17 June 2020, Debretsion Gebremichael, head of the TPLF, stated that the federal government was "threatening war" against the Tigray Region. From June to November 2020, in Ullega tabiya (municipality) in the Chercher woreda of Raya Azebo, TPLF Liyou Hail special military forces camped in the main primary school in Kebele and dug trenches in preparation for possible conflict, according to residents interviewed by the Ethiopian Human Rights Commission (EHRC). The TPLF stated that the aim was to provide a COVID-19 pandemic checkpoint. The EHRC visited the school and observed the trenches in early January 2021.

During 2020, the TPLF judged the economic and political changes in Ethiopia under Abiy's prime ministership to be "unacceptably threatening" to the control that the TPLF had enjoyed in Ethiopia for nearly three decades, and aimed to retain its de facto dominance and considerable autonomy in Ethiopian politics and its economy.

=== Anti-TPLF forces ===
In the months before fighting erupted in November 2020, Mr. Abiy moved troops toward Tigray and sent military cargo planes into Eritrea. Behind closed doors, his advisers and military generals debated the merits of a conflict. Those who disagreed were fired, interrogated at gunpoint or forced to leave.

On 27 January 2020, Ethiopian prime minister Abiy Ahmed, Eritrean president Isaias Afwerki and Somali president Mohamed Abdullahi Mohamed (Farmaajo) held a Tripartite Agreement meeting in Asmara. Martin Plaut suggested that the 27 January meeting, together with bilateral meetings by Abiy to an Eritrean military base in July 2020, Farmaajo to Asmara on 4 October 2020, and Isaias to the Harar Meda Airport Ethiopian air base in Bishoftu on 14–15 October 2020 were used by the three leaders to discuss and prepare a strategy for the Tigray War.

According to Mesfin Hagos, former Defence Minister of Eritrea from 1994 to 1995 and current political asylee in Germany, "in the run-up to the current conflict, a large number of Ethiopian elite units had slowly trickled into Eritrea as part of a security pact between Ethiopian prime minister Abiy Ahmed and Eritrean president Isaias Afwerki" and based in Gherghera near Asmara. Mesfin stated that according to the plan, the Ethiopian units at Gherghera "were expected to be the hammer and the Northern Command the anvil to strike out of existence the TPLF."

=== TPLF blocks Northern command appointments ===
On 29 October 2020, the TPLF rejected the federal government's appointment of new leadership for the ENDF's Northern Command. Three officers, Brig. Gen Belay Seyoum Akele, the new Commander of the Northern Command, and one of his deputies Brig. Gen. Seid Tekuye, as well as Lt. Gen. Molla Haile Mariam, were told by TPLF to cancel their flights to Mekelle. The other deputy commander, Brig. Gen. Jamal Mohammed, was turned away by the TPLF upon arrival in Mekelle. According to Getachew Reda, a senior official of the TPLF, the decision was made on the premise that Tigray would no longer recognize any decisions made by the federal government or any officials appointed by them.

== Timeline ==
=== September 2020 ===
In September the Tigrayans went ahead with a regional election, in open defiance of an order from Abiy. Abiy moved troops from the Somali and Oromia regions toward Tigray.

=== October 2020 ===
In a video conference call in mid-October, Abiy told governing party officials that he would intervene militarily in Tigray, and that it would take only three to five days to oust the region's leaders, said Gebremeskel, a former senior official now in exile.

=== November 2020 ===
==== 2 November ====
The European Union foreign policy chief, Josep Borrell Fontelles, publicly appealed to both sides to halt "provocative military deployments."

Debretsion Gebremichael stated to journalists that the Ethiopian National Defense Force (ENDF) planned and made preparations to attack Tigray Region.

==== 3 November ====
Late in the night of Tuesday, 3 November 2020, Tigray regional security forces, loyal to the ruling Tigray People's Liberation Front (TPLF) launched a surprise attack on the Northern Command of the ENDF in Mekelle, and other Northern Command bases in the Tigray region. A senior member of the TPLF, Sekoutoure Getachew, said that a pre-emptive strike had been carried out in self-defence. Several people were said to have been killed in the attack, including destroyed properties, while others sustained injuries, and according to the Ethiopian government, the military base was looted of light and heavy weapons.

==== 4 November ====
Subsequently, Abiy Ahmed, the Prime Minister of Ethiopia, declared a military offensive that would be launched to restore the rule of law and central government authority. A state of emergency was declared in the region for the 6 months following this attack. Electricity, telephone and internet services in Tigray were shut down by federal authorities, though there were claims were made that the TPLF itself had shut them down. NetBlocks reported a subnational drop in Ethiopia of about 15% in internet connectivity at 01:00 East Africa Time. The Tigray Regional Administration threatened to retaliate to any form of attack, as they prohibited all aspects of transportation, including flights.

Following the shutdown of telephone and internet services in Tigray, Amnesty International urged the Ethiopian authorities to quickly restore communications so as to respect people's rights to freedom of expression. The UN also called for an urgent de-escalation of the growing conflict in the region.

==== 5 November ====
On 5 November 2020, Debretsion Gebremichael, Chief Administrator of the Tigray Region, claimed that Tigrayan forces seized most of the weapons at the Ethiopian Military's Northern Command headquarters. Debretsion also stated that many in the Northern Command had defected to the Tigrayan side, though this claim was rejected by the Ethiopian government as "false information", and that the Ethiopian Air Force was bombing areas near Mekelle, the capital of Tigray.

The Ethiopian Human Rights Commission reported in January 2021 that fighting in Dansha during the first half of November caused the death of around 25 civilians who were caught in the crossfire between warring parties.

==== 6 November ====
On 6 November 2020, Abiy disclosed that his administration had launched an airstrike against the forces of the fortified Tigray region in several locations. According to Abiy's announcement, rockets and other weapons were destroyed but was later found out to be by rocket attacks on Gondar, Bahirdar and Asmara. Prime Minister Abiy Ahmed accused the Tigray People's Liberation Front of "criminal hubris and intransigence", claiming they rejected the federal government's efforts at "mediation, reconciliation, dialogue". Moreover, Sudan closed its border with Ethiopia and the United Nations called for immediate de-escalation of tensions and a peaceful resolution to the conflict.

==== 7 November ====
On 7 November 2020, the Ethiopian parliament voted to endorse the creation of an interim government for the northern Tigray region in order to avoid the outbreak of a civil war in the country, as the conflict intensified in the region. The Tigray government was declared to be illegal, during the emergency session held by the parliament. The declaration was made by the House of Federation, one of the Ethiopian parliamentary chambers, Separately, 10 officials in the capital were detained over allegations of terrorism, the mayor of Addis Ababa, Adanech Abebe, announced.

==== 8 November ====
On 8 November 2020, as the Ethiopian military's offensive in the northern Tigray region entered its fifth day, Prime Minister Abiy Ahmed announced the replacement of several high-ranking officials within his government. As the military resumed new rounds of airstrikes, Abiy's head of intelligence, army chief and foreign minister were replaced and included a new federal police commissioner being appointed. Deputy Prime Minister Demeke Mekonnen filled the position of foreign minister, while deputy army chief Birhanu Jula was promoted to army chief of staff. The former Regional leader of Amhara, Temesgen Tiruneh, was appointed as the new head of intelligence. Abiy did not reveal his rationale behind making the changes to his administration's military and intelligence office. On Twitter, Abiy urged Ethiopians not to discriminate against Tigrayans in the face of worsening internal conflict.

==== 9 November ====
On 9 November 2020, the leadership of the Tigray Region claimed that more than 10 airstrikes had been carried out against them by the Ethiopian federal government. Hundreds of people were believed to have died in the conflict, according to government sources. The Ethiopian army was also reported to have lost hundreds of its personnel in the battle of Dansha. That night, 600 civilians, mostly ethnic Amharas in Welkait, were killed in a massacre in the town of Mai Kadra using machetes and knives by local militias and police loyal to the TPLF, according to preliminary investigations by Amnesty International and the Ethiopian Human Rights Commission. Alternate accounts of the massacre have been presented by Tigrayan refugees interviewed by Reuters blaming Amhara militias for the massacres.

==== 10 November ====
On 10 November, Ethiopian federal forces seized parts of Tigray, including Humera Airport. Several Tigrayan troops were said to have surrendered to the Ethiopian military during the takeover of the airport. Tigray Region President, Debretsion Gebremichael reported that the Eritrean Army had launched attacks on the northern border, which was labeled as "false information" by Major General Mohammed Tessema. At least 2500 Ethiopians had reportedly fled from northern Tigray to neighboring Sudan. According to Alsir Khaled, the head of Sudan's refugee agency in eastern Kassala town, many Ethiopian soldiers were among the refugees who fled the country to Sudan.

Government-allied militias beat and killed seven children of one family in Shiglil (Western Tigray) between 4 and 10 November 2020.

==== 11 November ====
Refugees fleeing to Sudan increased significantly on 11 November 2020, with about 10,000 refugees having crossed the border since hostilities began. No further news regarding military advances from either side was reported on Wednesday.

==== 12 November ====
Amnesty International reported massacres taking place in the Tigray Region. Amnesty provided preliminary information on the suspected perpetrators of the massacres. Witnesses blamed the Tigray People's Liberation Front for the "horrific tragedy" taking place in Mai Kadra. Airstrikes continued to hit the region hard after Abiy Ahmed blamed the TPLF of committing war crimes. A group of investigators were sent by the Ethiopian Human Rights Commission to Mai Kadra to investigate the mass killings.

The ENDF claimed in late November to have gained control of Humera on 12 November. Massacres of 20 ethnic Tigrayans in Humera were later reported by refugees who had fled Humera.

==== 13 November ====
On 13 November, the Ethiopian Parliament appointed the Minister of Education Mulu Nega to replace Debretsion Gebremichael as the president of the Tigray Region, although rejected by the TPLF.

The Ethiopian National Defense Force and Eritrean Defence Forces entered Tigray from the north, killing dozens of civilians in Zalambessa (Eastern Tigray). There was indiscriminate shelling on the town for 13 consecutive hours. Then soldiers of both armies were accused of going house to house arbitrarily killing civilians. Burials were prohibited and corpses eaten in the streets by hyenas and dogs. Every killing has been carefully documented by some survivors. In one case, which is not at all most extreme, the soldiers entered a house and killed both spouses, then occupied the house, and settled there while feasting on the slaughtered goats of the family. They stayed 12 days in the house, eating the 30 goats, and only after that the bodies of the spouses could be buried.

Pro-TPLF media circulated a claim by Debretsion that the Ethiopian government had bombed the Tekeze Dam, cutting off vital power to the region. A claim denied by the government, which said that the surge from the reservoir would have been catastrophic and immediately noticeable had the allegations been true.

The UN refugee agency stated that the number of Ethiopians, mainly civilians, fleeing into Sudan had reached more than 14,500.

==== 14 November ====
31 civilians were killed in the village of Bisober in southern Tigray in a three-day fight starting 14 November between TPLF and ENDF troops. Tigray Special Forces had been encamped in the local elementary school for seven months, and when fighting broke out "Tigrayan combatants broke into abandoned homes from which they fired on Ethiopian soldiers". According to an Agence France-Presse correspondent, 21 civilians were killed in the crossfire and 6 others were killed while trying to flee the area. According to an EHRC report, some of the TPLF fighters were dressed in civilian clothes, shooting from homes, and 31 civilians died, including one which had been beheaded.

UN Secretary-General António Guterres warned the Tigray conflict could potentially destabilize the entire Horn of Africa region. Overnight, rocket attacks were reported in Gondar Airport and Bahir Dar Airports, with the Tigray regional government claiming responsibility. Besides extensive damage to the runways, one house was destroyed in Bahir Dar and four civilians wounded. Getachew Reda, the Tigray spokesman, claimed that the rebel government would soon "conduct missile attacks to foil military movements in Massawa and Asmara". The federal government claimed that the attacks were "indicative of TPLF's last resort attempts to maintain control". The government added that the attack on Bahir Dar airport failed, as the target was missed.

Later in the day, there were reports of missile strikes in Asmara, the capital of Eritrea, with the Ministry of Information and Asmara International Airport being hit, and reports of a blackout, and some fleeing the city.

==== 15 November ====
The following day, Debretsion had confirmed that the TPLF had bombed Asmara Airport and that his forces had been fighting Eritrean forces "on several fronts" over the last few days. It was reported that the number of refugees who had fled from Tigray to Sudan had reached 25,000. Reda claimed that the United Arab Emirates was attacking Tigray using drones launched from its base in Assab, Eritrea. Bellingcat later confirmed that the base contained CAIG Wing Loong II drones, but could not find evidence that they were being used in Tigray. In early December, it appeared that indeed, the offensive of joint ENDF-Amhara-Eritrean forces into Tigray had been facilitated by the intervention of "Pterosaurus" drones, launched by the United Arab Emirates from its base in Assab (Eritrea). The Chinese-made armed drones bombed Tigrayan towns and defence forces. EEPA provided a summarised translation of the Chinese article confirming the content.

==== 16 November ====
The Ethiopian Government stated that Ethiopian forces had taken the town of Alamata on the southeastern tip of Tigray Region. A Government spokesman said that the TPLF forces had fled and arrested 10,000 prisoners. It was not immediately clear who these prisoners were. Government forces were also said to be heading towards Humera to the west of the Tigray Region on the border with both Sudan and Eritrea.

Ahead of the Ethiopian National Defense Force and Eritrean Defence Forces arrival in late November 2020, heavy bombing levelled homes and businesses in Wukro in Eastern Tigray sending plumes of dust and smoke rising above near-deserted streets on 16 November 2020. The Ethiopian Air force used "Pterosaurus" drones, launched by the United Arab Emirates from its base in Assab, Eritrea.

==== 17 November ====
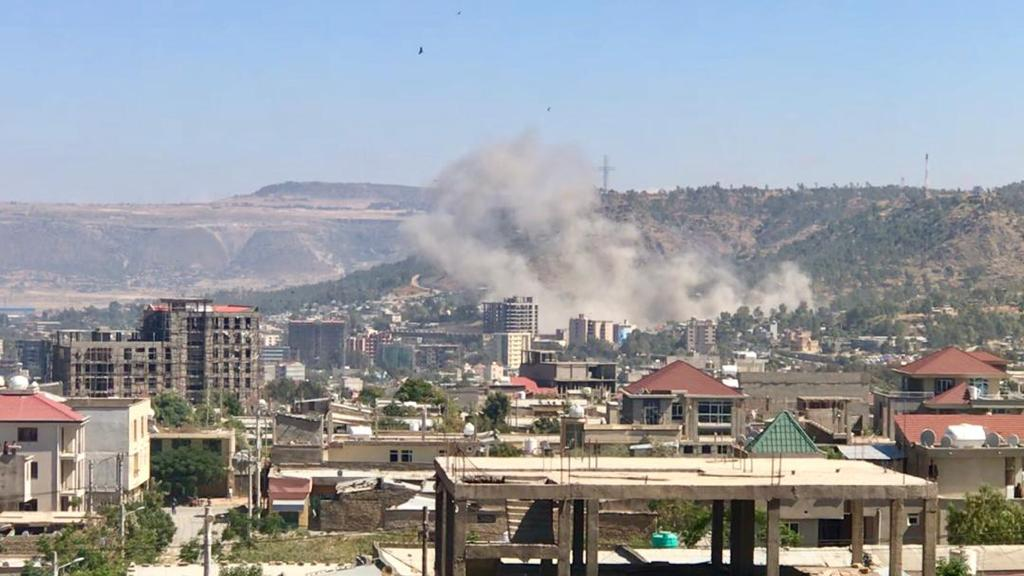
Mekelle airstrike

Prime Minister Abiy Ahmed posted on social media that Ethiopian armed forces were about to launch a "final and crucial" offensive after a "three-day deadline" for the Tigray authorities to surrender had expired. Abiy also confirmed airstrikes in the region and claimed they were "surgical" strikes that did not target civilians.

==== 18 November ====
The Prime Minister was reported as saying that the Ethiopian Army had captured the cities of Shire and Axum and was advancing on Mekelle. The government reported that Tigray's forces were destroying bridges near the city in order to slow the advance. Tigray's leader confirmed his soldiers had lost territory but said it was a temporary setback and denied destroying the bridges. The leaders of Tigray also maintained that they would never surrender to the Ethiopian government.

The Ethiopian federal police disclosed that arrest warrants had been issued for 76 army officers, on the allegation of treason. The officers were accused of conspiring with the leaders of the Tigray region. According to the Ethiopian Federal Police Commission, the officers were associated with the attack that was carried out on 4 November, by forces of the Tigray People's Liberation Front, on the Ethiopian army's Northern Command.

==== 19 November ====
Federal troops seized the town of Shire Inda Selassie from the Tigray People's Liberation Front (TPLF) as government forces advanced on the Tigray Region's capital Mekelle. There were conflicting reports of the status of Axum, with both sides claiming to control the historic town, while thousands more people fled into Sudan from the Tigray Region, according to international aid workers.

The Ethiopian army chief of staff, General Berhanu Jula, alleged that the Director-General of the World Health Organization (WHO), Tedros Adhanom Ghebreyesus, who is ethnic-Tigray and a member of the TPLF, had attempted to obtain arms for the TPLF. General Birhanu Jula described the Director-General as a criminal, and called for his removal, although he did not provide any evidence to back his allegations. Dr Tedros went on Twitter to deny these allegations. He added that he had not chosen any side and is only supporting peace.

In December, the Danish Refugee Council reported deaths of three of its security guards and the International Rescue Committee reported death of one of its staff on 19 November in Hitsats Refugee Camp. The camp was captured by troops fighting for the Ethiopian government on 21 November. According to witnesses, the soldiers who entered the camp were Eritrean and engaged in clashes with local militiamen. Many civilians were killed in the fighting according to witnesses. Aid workers told The New York Times that after the clashes, the Eritrean soldiers looted aid materials and vehicles, burnt crops and a forested area, and shot up the main water tank. They also took back several Eritrean refugees back to Eritrea per witnesses.

==== 20 November ====
Mekelle University officials said that an airstrike had inflicted significant damage to the university in the capital of Tigray. The Ethiopian government claimed that its forces had captured the town of Adwa from the TPLF.

In Adwa, 31 civilians were reported to have been killed by the Eritrean Defence Forces.

Amhara Regional officials reported that the TPLF had launched a rocket attack on the capital, Bahir Dar, but that it caused no damage. The two missiles reportedly caused large explosions and one of them landed near an airport.

The UN announced that it was making plans for the possibility that up to 200,000 refugees could flee to neighboring Sudan. The UN also called for the opening of humanitarian corridors, without specifying where exactly they should be located.

==== 21 November ====
Ethiopian federal forces made an assault on the city of Adigrat, with the Ethiopian government claiming it had captured the town. The TPLF announced that there had been heavy bombardment in which nine civilians were killed.

One witness said Eritrean Defence Forces (EDF) massacred dozens of civilians in the town of Idaga Hamus after the EDF gained control and as revenge for the deaths of EDF soldiers. A witness in Adigrat said at least 12 young men were accused by EDF of being TPLF fighters and were summarily executed.

==== 22 November ====
The Ethiopian government stated that Idaga Hamus had been captured by the ENDF, while Debretsion Gebremichael said that TPLF troops had stalled Ethiopian forces on the southern front.

A military spokesperson for Ethiopia, Col Dejene Tsegaye, announced that Mekelle would be encircled and shelled with the intention of capturing the town. He told Tigray civilians to shelter in place and avoid military installations because "there will be no mercy".

==== 23 November ====
On 23 November, Abiy Ahmed announced that Tigray forces had 72 hours to surrender but the TPLF refused and vowed to keep on fighting. The state-affiliated media also accused the TPLF of destroying the Axum Airport. In Amhara Region, residents said that rocket strikes occurred on Bahir Dar during dawn. A reporter of the Agence France-Presse news agency visited the western Tigray town of Humera, that had been heavily shelled, including from the Eritrean side where it was evident that most of the inhabitants had fled. Administration of the conquered parts of Western Tigray had been taken over by officials from Amhara Region.

==== 24 November ====
The Tigray People's Liberation Front forces claimed that they destroyed an Ethiopian National Defense Force division. The Ethiopian government denied this and claimed that many Tigrayan fighters surrendered, as the 72-hour ultimatum previously issued by Prime Minister Abiy Ahmed approached its end and a military build-up was growing around the region's capital, Mekelle.

==== 26 November ====
Ahmed ordered federal military forces to launch an attack on Mekelle.

==== 27 November ====
During a meeting with three African Union special envoys, Prime Minister Abiy Ahmed rejected holding talks with the leaders of the Tigray region. However, Abiy maintained that he was ready to have a dialogue with the legally recognized Tigray representatives. The TPLF were reported to have fired at least four rockets at Eritrea according to the media, though the group did not claim responsibility. The Eritrean media stated that rockets landed near Asmara as well as surrounding towns. One diplomat stated that there were reports of one landing to the south of Asmara. Another diplomat claimed that one of them struck a neighbourhood of Asmara but this couldn't be confirmed. No casualties were reported in the attack. Abiy announced that the final phase of the offensive had been launched with direct assault on Mekelle.

Meanwhile, the Umm Rakouba camp in Sudan which was intended to shelter 5,000 refugees fleeing from Ethiopia's unrest had reached twice its initial capacity, the United Nations's refugee agency confirmed on Friday.

==== 28 November ====
On 27 and 28 November civilians were reported to have been massacred in Wukro by the Ethiopian and Eritrean armies.

Both Prime Minister Abiy Ahmed and the Chief of General Staff Birhanu Jula Gelalcha confirmed that Mekelle had fully come under the control of the ENDF. Abiy had denied any civilians were harmed during the assault and that thousands of troops had been freed from the Northern Command, after being held hostage by the Tigray People's Liberation Front. However, federal troops have continued looking for the leaders of the TPLF, the BBC added.

Six explosions in Asmara during the night were reported by the United States State Department, although the reason was not immediately clear. Neither the Eritrean government, nor the TPLF commented on the issue and nobody claimed responsibility. Two diplomats based in Addis Ababa told Agence France-Presse that the explosions were caused by rockets, which apparently struck Asmara International Airport and Eritrean military facilities.

==== 29 November ====
The TPLF said they had shot down an ENDF MiG-23 that crashed near Abiy Addi, while the pilot successfully ejected and was captured. Tigray TV broadcast images from the crash-site which showed the complete destruction of the aircraft. It isn't known how the airplane crashed. The TPLF leader Debretsion announced that they had recaptured the northern town of Axum from the federal government forces. ETV said that 70 graves had been found in Humera, consisting of both individual and mass graves. The channel didn't specify who was responsible for the deaths. Both the federal Ethiopian forces and the TPLF, as well as militias supporting them, have been accused of mass-killing by investigators of human rights violations.

Claims that South Sudan had been the new hideout of Debretsion Gebremichael, the chairman of the Tigray People's Liberation Front and president of the Tigray Region, brought distress and unease to the Ethiopian political establishment. The Ethiopian Ambassador to South Sudan abruptly left South Sudan soon after and the Ethiopian government made the decision to expel all South Sudanese diplomats from the country.

==== 30 November ====
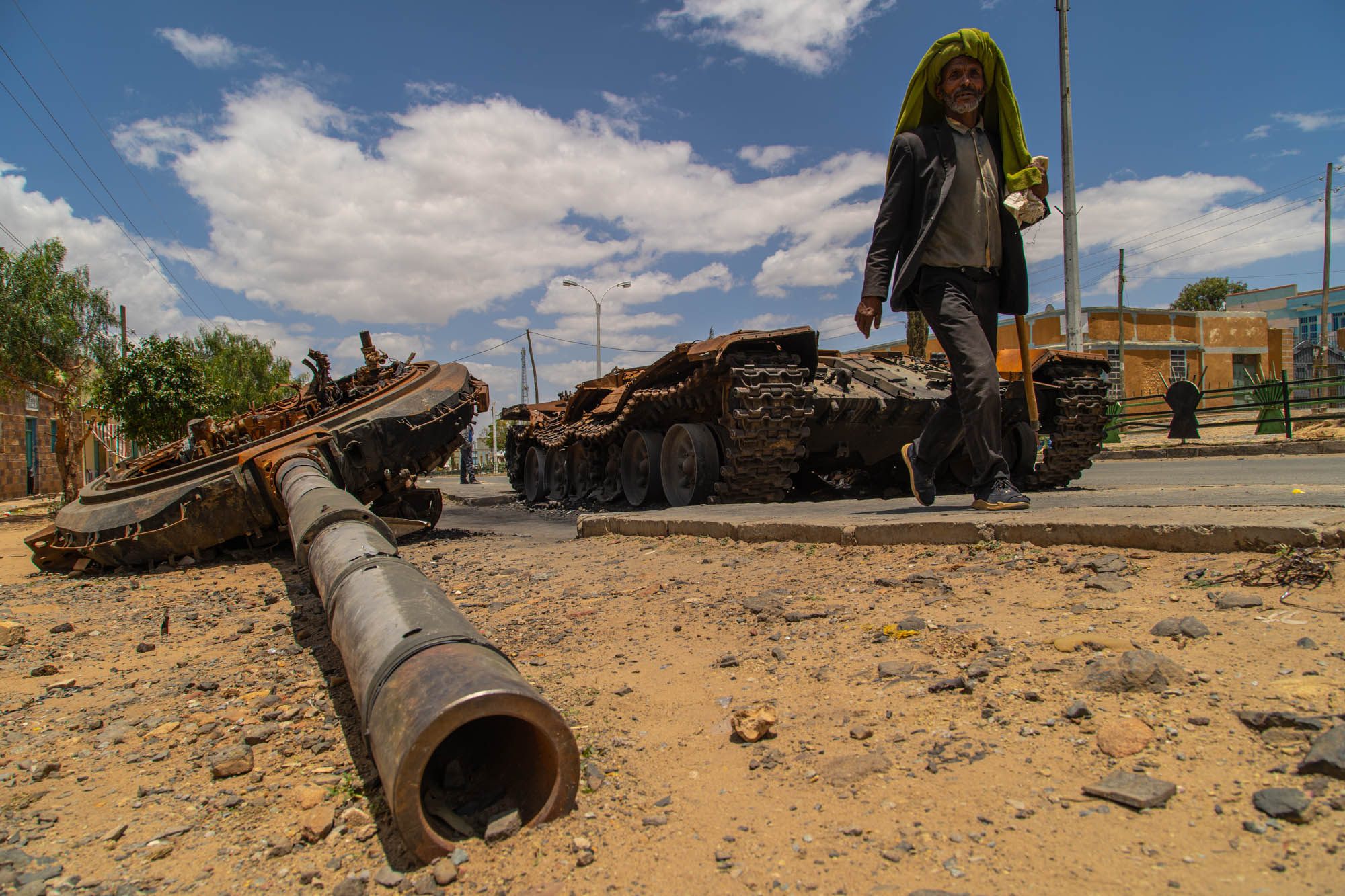
A man passes by a destroyed tank on the main street of Edaga Hamus, in the Tigray region, in Ethiopia, on 5 June 2021. (Yan Boechat/VOA)

According to the leader of Ethiopia's Tigray region, Debretsion Gebremichael, despite the government's declaration of victory over Mekelle during the weekend, fighting is yet to stop on all fronts. Debretsion urged Prime Minister Abiy Ahmed to quit what he described as insanity and to pull back the federal troops from the region. The Tigray leader also accused Ethiopian troops of launching a series of operations that was aimed at eliminating the Tigrayans.

Furthermore, Debretsion Gebremichael also claimed that his forces were still in possession of several missiles, as well as an imprecise number of prisoners belonging to the Ethiopian troops. While Abiy claimed that during midnight, TPLF leaders had fled to the west of Mekelle, in an area between Hagere Selam and Abiy Addi, adding federal troops didn't attack since the TPLF leaders had their family and abducted soldiers with them. Debretsion told AFP he was near Mekelle, not Hagere Selam, while claiming the TPLF withdrew from Mekelle to avoid harm to civilians. He reported fighting in Hawzen and Wukro on 29 November 2020, plus activities near Shire, but there was no fighting in Tigray on 30 November.

On 30 November, an extraordinary session of the Ethiopian parliament was called by Prime Minister Abiy Ahmed. During the session, he claimed that no civilian was killed during the assault on Mekelle and 99% of missiles launched by the ENDF hit their targets. He rejected notions that the Ethiopian government would destroy the city.

In one of the biggest of the Adigrat massacres, the EDF extrajudicially killed 35 civilians in Mariam Dengelat (or Dinglet) church (near Edaga Hamus), according to The New York Times. The numbers of civilians executed were later estimated as being in the range of 37–150 by EEPA.

=== December 2020 ===
==== 1 December ====
On 1 December, Keria Ibrahim, one of the nine TPLF Central Committee members and former Speaker of the HoF, was reported to have surrendered to federal security forces.

Gebremichael denied fleeing to South Sudan, claiming he was still near Mekelle. He also claimed that the TPLF had captured Eritrean soldiers near Wukro.

==== 2 December ====
On 2 December, Ethiopia and the UN signed a deal in which the UN will open humanitarian access in federally controlled land to help people displaced as a result of the conflict. Tigray's population of 6 million people have been battling hunger and food shortages since the eruption of violence between the federal government and the Tigray regional government and is now expected to have access to items such as medicines, food and several other forms of aid. The UN's humanitarian agency, United Nations Office for the Coordination of Humanitarian Affairs (OCHA), stated that the UN will receive "unimpeded, sustained, and secure access" for humanitarian aid in the Tigray region.

==== 3 December ====
Doctors in Mekelle claimed the civilian casualties in the Battle of Mekelle during the federal capture of the city were 27 deaths and 100 injured, contrary to Abiy's previous claims that no citizens were killed during the offensive in Tigray. An aid worker told Reuters that clashes were still taking place to the south, north and west of Mekelle.

==== 4 December ====
According to UN officials, in the town of Ziban Gedena, in NW Tigray, soldiers of the Eritrean Defence Forces burned 150 homesteads, killed 300 civilians, looted or slaughtered 90% of oxen and livestock, burned and stole harvests.

According to the leader of the Tigray region, Debretsion Gebremichael, protests erupted in Mekelle, just days after it was captured by the Ethiopian troops, as reports suggested that Eritrean troops were looting buildings. Government spokesman Billene Seyoum Woldeyes claimed that nearly all of the TPLF commanders had been killed or arrested. Residents of Mekelle confirmed that there were protests and looting in the city on 4 December. Meanwhile, images of people occupying the streets and shopping in Mekelle were broadcast by State media as the chief executive of Tigray appointed by the government claimed that peace was stabilizing in Mekelle. TPLF spokesman Getachew Reda said government forces had bombed Abiy Addi.

==== 5 December ====
The federal forces claimed to have captured the TPLF's spokesman, Getachew Reda, in a video broadcast on the state channel ETV. On the same day they also claimed to be 10 km (6 mi) away from the area which is believed to be the main TPLF hideout.

==== 7 December ====
Prime Minister Abiy Ahmed dismissed the possibility of the forces of northern Tigray having the capability to go on a military offensive from the mountainous areas of the region. Abiy maintained that the defiant group had been completely defeated and destabilized. Following Abiy's statement, there has not been any immediate comment from the Tigray People's Liberation Front (TPLF). Meanwhile, a United Nations (UN) team attempting to visit a refugee camp reported to have been shot at.

On the same day, arrest warrants were issued for 10 senior police officers in Addis Ababa on the charges of suspected treason, according to the Ethiopian federal police commission.

==== 8 December ====
On 8 December, the Ethiopian government officially announced it had fired on and detained a UN humanitarian force for allegedly ignoring two military checkpoints and for going to areas where "they were not supposed to go." The group claimed they were trying to assess the roads before the aid convoys could go through. The convoy was accused of going through two military checkpoints and were trying to pass through a third near Sheraro when they were reportedly shot at. The government stated that it did not "need a UN 'baby-sitter'" getting involved in the conflict. The UN spokesperson Stéphane Dujarric called the incident "alarming" and stated that the UN was "engaging at the highest level with the federal government to express our concerns and avoid any such incidents in the future."

==== 9 December ====
U.N. High Commissioner for Human Rights, Michelle Bachelet said the United Nations had received reports of fighting going on near Mekelle, Sheraro, Axum, Abiy Addi and the areas straddling the border between the Amhara and Tigray Region. Bachelet stated that they had verified reports of human rights abuses and had also received reports of forced recruitment of Tigrayans to fight against the TPLF.

==== 10 December ====
A spokesperson for the United States Department of State told Reuters that it had credible reports of Eritrean troops presently active in Tigray and called on them to withdraw. Former Eritrean defense minister Mesfin Hagos in an article published in African Arguments, cited sources in the government and outside to claim that Eritrea had deployed four mechanized divisions, seven divisions of infantry and a brigade of commandos to assist the Ethiopian army.

==== 11 December ====
United Nations High Commissioner for Refugees Filippo Grandi said that the agency had received many reports of Eritrean refugees being killed, kidnapped or sent back to Eritrea by force. He also called on the Ethiopian government to guarantee safe access to aid workers and to protect civilians.

==== 12 December ====
On 12 December, it was reported that the first aid convoy had reached the capital of the northern Tigray region, Mekelle, according to the Ethiopian Red Cross Society. Seven white trucks belonging to the International Committee of the Red Cross (ICRC) were said to have delivered medicine, as well as other supplies in Mekelle.

==== 13 December ====
On 13 December Sudan's prime minister, Abdalla Hamdok announced that Ethiopia and Sudan had come to an agreement to hold a summit of East African countries to discuss a resolution to stop the fighting. In an announcement made by the Transitional Government, civilians within the Tigray region were ordered to disarm by 15 December or face possible arrest. On the same day Prime Minister Abiy Ahmed held talks with Ethiopian National Defense Force (ENDF) officials in the city of Mekelle. Abiy made the journey to Tigray with the region's new provisional administration and stated that telecommunications and electricity were being restored.

==== 14 December ====
On 14 December civil servants within the region were expected to go back to work and those who did not were deemed to have voluntarily resigned. Flights to the Tigray region were promptly resumed. Electricity supply along with ability to call via cell phones was restored to Mekelle. Six other towns in the region also had mobile voice call services restored.

==== 15 December ====
EEPA claimed that on 15 December 750 people hiding in the Church of Our Lady Mary of Zion (Maryam Ts'iyon Church) in Aksum were taken out and shot dead in the square in front of the church by the ENDF and Amhara militias.

On 15 December Mulu Nega, the chief executive of the Transitional Government of Tigray announced that a new mayor had been appointed in Mekelle. He did not name the new mayor. He also stated that representatives of Tigrayan opposition parties including Arena Tigray, the Tigray Democratic Party (TDP) and the Assimba Democratic Party (ADP) would be assigned positions in the regional administration. Along with the rehabilitation effort that has begun in previous days of the week, Ethiopian Airlines announced that it has resumed flight to Mekelle City after disruption for weeks. On the same day door-to-door searches for civilian possession of firearms began after previous announcements ordering civilians to disarm.

The NGO Europe External Programme with Africa (EEPA) said that a fire was detected in Hagere Selam during the night of 15–16 December, which seemed to corroborate reports of attacks in the area. A witness alleged to Der Spiegel of Eritrean forces massacring 81 civilians at the Al-Nejashi mosque in Negash.

On 15 December several Sudanese soldiers were killed near the border with Ethiopia. Sudan claims they were killed in an ambush by Ethiopian forces and militias. The attack resulted in the deaths of an army officer and three soldiers according to the Sudan Tribune, while 27 soldiers sustained injury. A soldier later told the newspaper that the Ethiopian forces had launched artillery attacks on them and intruded into the Jebel al-Teyyour area, located 7 kilometres inside Sudan. Other soldiers said that the attackers were Amhara and were trying to stop the Sudanese Army from deploying in areas where Ethiopian farmers planted crops.

==== 16 December ====
On 16 December the EU announced they would delay their financial aid to Ethiopia of €90 million euros, which is equivalent to about US$109 million or 4.29 billion Ethiopian birrs. The money was initially intended to be delivered at the end of the year, but was delayed due to EU concerns over the Ethiopian government restricting humanitarian access in Tigray.

On Wednesday, the Sudanese army stated that some of its officers were attacked by the Ethiopian forces and militias, while on a security patrol on the border region within the Sudanese territory. According to the Sudanese military's statement, the attack occurred on Tuesday, upon the return of their forces from a patrol along the Abu Tyour area in the al-Qadarif province which borders Ethiopia. They also added lives and properties were lost, while withholding the exact number of army officers that were allegedly killed during the ambush.

==== 17 December ====
On 17 December UN Emergency Relief Co-ordinator Mark Lowcock announced that the UN would be releasing $36.5 million in aid for the Tigray Region and refugees in Sudan. Ethiopian Foreign Ministry spokesman Dina Mufti presented the incident at the Sudanese border as Ethiopia trying to stop a Sudanese militia attempting to cross into Ethiopian territory and seize farmlands. Abiy posted on Twitter that Ethiopian forces had engaged a local militia along the border with Sudan, though not identifying which country the group belonged to. The Egyptian newspaper Mada Masr reported that three Egyptian officials and a European diplomat briefed on the situation had mentioned to them that the UAE was using the Assab base to launch drone strikes in Tigray, while also providing support to the Ethiopian forces. It was also reported that Egypt attempted to persuade Sudan to assist the TPLF, forcing a weakened Abiy to yield to concessions over the Grand Ethiopian Renaissance Dam.

==== 18 December ====
The Deputy Spokesman for the UN Secretary General, Farhan Haq, said on 18 December that the International Organization for Migration had provided aid to border areas of the Tigray Region, while World Food Programme had dispatched aid to some camps in Tigray. Aid workers had informed the UN of electricity and telephone connectivity being irregular in Mekelle, but people in other areas still lacked access to food, water, money, electricity and telecommunication. He called on Ethiopia to allow unrestricted access to all areas where people had suffered from the conflict. Communication to the region remains inconsistent per Reuters and tightly controlled by the government, making independent verification of the accounts of the conflict impossible.

Sudan was reported to have been engaging in a military build-up along the border with Ethiopia and sending reinforcements, increasing already tense relations. Radio France Internationale reported of military sources telling them that their forces had recaptured Jebel Abutiour, where the Ethiopian forces had clashed with them on 15 December. An EEPA report stated that looting of 500 dairy cows and hundreds of calves by Amhara forces had been reported in Tigray. Meanwhile, clashes between Afar and Amhara were reported to have taken place in the region starting 15 December.

According to an EEPA report, pictures have emerged showing the Al Negash Mosque being heavily damaged. It was reportedly bombed and looted by Ethiopian and Eritrean forces.

In Zalambessa, 7 civilians were reported to have been killed.

==== 19 December ====
ENDF was reported to loot the Sur Company. In Adigrat, 16 civilians were killed while trying to stop Eritrean and ENDF soldiers from robbing the Addis Pharmaceutical Factory. Sudan was reported to have captured Eritrean soldiers disguised as Amhara militiamen while participating along with Amharan special forces in Sudan's border. The Sudanese army and the Rapid Support Forces were reported to have retaken areas previously taken by Ethiopian forces in Al Qadarif state, according to Sudan Tribune.

==== 20 December ====
On 20 December, Agency for Refugees and Returnees Affair (ARRA) has reactivated the humanitarian assistance to Eritrean refugees that was disrupted due to the law enforcement operation in Tigray Regional State.

In Western Tigray, VRT journalist Stijn Vercruysse reported deserted homesteads and seeing bodies on the roads. He stated that everything indicated Eritrean soldiers were present in the region and were forcefully taking back Eritrean refugees to Eritrea. Vercruysse also said fighting was continuing in several areas and found Shimelba refugee camp nearly empty.

There have been reports of ritual books and other artifacts from remote monasteries in Tigray being looted and taken to Eritrea. Per analyst Rashid Abdi, the TPLF command structure remains intact, with only two leaders arrested and more than 70 having withdrawn to the mountainous areas of Tigray.

==== 21 December ====
Tigray Interim Administration CEO Mulu Nega and Tigray's Prosperity Party Senior Leader Abraham Belay held discussion with residents of Weqro town about the situation in the region. During the discussion, the participants expressed their joy over the swift resumption of electricity and water supply. However, the residents also pointed out that they are still facing problems due to lack of telecommunication, banking, medical and transportation services. They said peace in the town has been improving after the defence force arrived. A witness told The Guardian that Eritrean soldiers had been leading their Ethiopian counterparts in the assault on Tigray, while indulging in looting, arson and shooting at civilians early on, before Ethiopian forces stepped in to restrain them. An aid worker said that Eritrean troops had looted, killed farm animals and set fire to crops, while also arming fellow Eritreans in Tigray. A UN official told the newspaper that they had reports of three UN guards being killed at Histas camp by Eritrean forces after they tried to stop them from taking the refugees. A refugee in the Adi Harush camp stated that the Eritrean troops were selectively hunting down refugees from their country, who seemed to be opposed to the government.

EEPA wrote that a witness said that ENDF had conducted the first of the Hagere Selam massacres in Hagere Salam after losing a battle. Afterwards, the town was completely looted by Eritrean troops. Other witnesses described the joint troops moving on roads through towns, putting civilians in harm's way. Meanwhile, operations of 16 non-Ethiopian agencies remain suspended alongside Ethiopian ones. Social media images showed 21 ENDF tanks and armoured cars destroyed by Tigray Defense Forces on the May Keyih-Hiwane road, alongside BM-21 rockets taken from the ENDF.

==== 22 December ====
The Chairperson of the African Union Commission (AUC), Moussa Faki Mahamat, spoke after the conclusion of a meeting of the Inter-governmental Authority on Development (IGAD) that Ethiopia took "legitimate" military action in its Tigray region to preserve the country's unity and stability. However he is concerned on humanitarian suffering of the conflict. In another development Michelle Bachelet called on Ethiopia to grant access to humanitarian organizations for investigating war crimes, adding the communications blockade made the situation more severe and both sides have been reported to indulge in abuses. She also revealed that only two humanitarian assessment missions of the UN were allowed to enter Tigray the day before. OHCHR mentioned witnesses describing shelling of Humera from 9–11 November, with the ENDF and Amharan forces killing civilians after capturing the town. Witnesses also accused them of robbing hospitals, banks, businesses, supermarket buildings and homes. Witnesses also reported killing of many civilians in the mountainous areas during the clashes from 20 to 24 November, after fleeing Adigrat in early November due to shelling.

Getachew Reda said on Twitter that the Ethiopian government's forces were being pushed back in Medebay Zana, while having lost hundreds of soldiers in Naeder Adet and Asgede Tsimbla. He also claimed that TPLF had downed an ENDF aircraft in Bet Mara and said clashes were going on many other fronts. A witness from Wukro told Der Spiegel that the Eritrean forces had killed eight people he knew and had looted places across Tigray. A TPLF member said they were recruiting an increasing number of young people. Ethiopian foreign minister Demeke Mekonnen said Sudan and Ethiopia had begun talks to demarcate their border. He also accused Sudanese troops of carrying out attacks on the border since November, looting crops of Ethiopian farmers, vandalising their camps, made harvesting crops difficult, while killing and wounding civilians.

==== 23 December ====
Around seventy people were killed by EDF in Hawzen around 23 December 2020.

Pompeo announced that the United States will provide $18 million to help the refugees and IDPs of the Tigray conflict. Laetitia Bader, the Human Rights Watch director for Horn of Africa region, described in an interview about witnesses from western Tigray telling them of heavy shelling or gunfire in the initial period of the conflict, particularly in Humera. Afterwards, federal troops would enter a town, followed by the Amhara militias called Liyu Hail and Fano. Witnesses also reported of civilians being trapped in crossfire in farmlands outside towns and many people being killed in the initial phase of the offensive. Some refugees described civilians being killed by ENDF or allied forces during and after the clashes.

Stéphane Dujarric, the spokesperson for the UN said that the World Food Programme had sent emergency medical supplies that could treat 10,000 people for three months, while food sent by it for 35,000 refugees had reached Adi Harush and Mai Ayni camps. The aid convoys dispatched to Hitsats and Shimelba camps however returned due to the insecure situation there. He announced delivering of water treatment chemicals to the region as well. In addition, UN and the Ethiopian government agreed to set up mechanisms for sharing humanitarian information for Tigray.

In an interview with Voice of America, Tigray Region's newly appointed interim health bureau chief Fasika Amdesellaise, who had also been working at the Ayder Referral Hospital in Mekelle when the federal forces captured it, admitted casualties had occurred during battle for Mekelle. Amdesellaise said he himself saw 22 corpses and 40 injured people, however they were able to help them since electricity was still on. Three days later, the electricity supply was shut off in the city and food also started running out, causing deaths of patients. He added that while Mekelle was recovering, his bureau still could not access Axum, Adwa, Shire and Temben. He claimed that they found all the cities lying deserted while traveling through them, with houses shut and the residents living under terror. He also stated that Adigrat Hospital, Adigrat Health Center and Wukro Hospital were looted.

==== 24 December ====
The Interim Administration of Tigray Regional State announced on 24 December 2020 the appointment of new cabinet members as they commenced their duties respectively. The cabinet has 16 members, with 11 of the 16 available cabinet positions being filled. On the same date, Vice News reported refugees in Sudan accusing militias allied with the federal government and ENDF of abuses and killing. Refugees told the outlet that Fano militias and the ENDF were stopping them from coming through main border posts, forcing them to take more dangerous paths to Sudan, like through Eritrea. Sudanese military sources told Vice News that they had taken advantage of Ethiopian forces vacating areas in the disputed border region due to the conflict, by sending their own troops there. Sudanese army's spokesman Lt. Col. Swarmi Khalid stated that they had not provided any support to TPLF, but they might change their approach if Ethiopia doesn't desist from hostility.

==== 26 December ====
Sudan's information minister Faisal Saleh said that the Sudanese army had recaptured 60–70% of the land on the border with Ethiopia, previously taken by the Ethiopian forces, and said Sudanese intelligence had confirmed that the ones behind the attack on them earlier were regular Ethiopian soldiers and not some militia. He added that clashes had died down since the last two days. Sudan Tribune reported that the Sudanese army had retaken 11 settlements in Quraisha area of al-Qadaref. These settlements are inhabited by Ethiopians. Military sources told the newspaper that Eritrean forces had moved to Um Hajar in the border triangle between Eritrea, Sudan and Ethiopia, and were accused of fighting with Ethiopian forces against TPLF earlier.

Photos of a looted factory, alleged to be the Almeda Textile Factory located in Adwa's outskirts, were published on Twitter, with Eritrean forces being accused of looting and destroying it.

==== 27 December ====
EEPA stated that social media reports claimed killing of 14 Eritrean soldiers by a man stopping them from looting his home in Adigrat, before he was gunned down. In addition massacres in Adwa and Adi Da'ero were also reported, with Eritrean troops accused of killing 31 in the former and 27 in the latter.

==== 28 December ====
The deputy chief of staff of the Sudanese Army, Khaled Abdin al-Shami, told Anadolu Agency that they had recaptured a border area in the al-Fashqa region, two decades after they lost it. He said that they could retake other areas that belonged to them, if they wanted, and accused Ethiopia of wilfully violating their shared border.

==== 29 December ====
After Sudan was reported to have captured the al-Fashqa region, Ethiopian Foreign Ministry's spokesman Dina Mufti warned the country of a counter-attack by Ethiopian forces if it did not stop intruding into Ethiopia's territory. He also accused another party of encouraging Sudan to take Ethiopia's territory. Major General Mohamed Ahmed Sabir said that Sudan didn't have hostility towards Ethiopia and were only retaking Sudanese border areas per the law. An EEPA report stated that per sources that ENDF had carried out killings of young men from 27 to 29 December in the village of Tashi, located near Samre after they failed to provide information on the TPLF's location.

==== 30 December ====
On 30 December 12 civilians were massacred in Wukro by the Ethiopian and Eritrean armies. Shelling by ENDF killed 21 civilians in Gijet. The Dutch charitable organisation ZOA said on the same day that an aid worker employed by them was killed in Hitsats camp, without detailing the cause or the worker's identity. 20 Eritrean refugees who had fled from Tigray to Addis Ababa were arrested by the Ethiopian Federal Police. The TPLF also claimed to have shot down a gunship of the ENDF.

==== 31 December ====
Sudan's foreign minister Omar Qamareddine announced on 31 December that Sudanese troops had regained all areas previously taken by the Ethiopian farmers. Chairman of the Sovereignty Council of Sudan Abdel Fattah al-Burhan said during a speech on the 65th anniversary of Sudan's independence, that Sudanese forces had been redeployed along the border with Ethiopia, adding that they hadn't crossed into Ethiopian territory nor ever will. al-Burhan also emphasised that Sudan wants to resolve the situation peacefully.

An EEPA report stated that 800 soldiers belonging to both the ENDF and Eritrean army had been reported to have retreated from Agula and May Mekden to Mekelle. It also said that some sources had reported looting of a church in Yeha and bombing of a school where civilians were taking refuge, although it was not clear that there had been casualties. Dimtsi Weyane claimed that TPLF had beaten the 4th Brigade of the ENDF while it was moving between Adwa and Edaga Arbi. TPLF claimed that they ambushed the brigade in Zongi, killing 124 soldiers and capturing 144. It also claimed to have captured their commander Col. Alemu Semie. The news outlet also claimed that the TPLF attacked Eritrean forces carrying plunder near Ziban Guila and forced them to retreat. Meanwhile, Dimtsi Weyane also accused the ENDF of killing 21 people in shelling on Gijet.

The Economist reported eyewitness accounts of Eritrean forces being in Tigray. Witnesses told the newspaper that Eritrean troops had been present in Adwa in November. Awet Tewelde Weldemichael, an Eritrean academic at Queen's University, said that Eritrean troops appeared to have started withdrawing from Tigray. EEPA stated that there had been reports of looting and destruction of health centres by Eritrean troops in Wukro, Negash, Idaga Hamus, and Adigrat were destroyed and looted, and that Eritrean forces weren't occupying any place but only proceeding through settlements.
