= December 2020 Gijet massacre =

2020 Tigray War massacre in Gijet

Coordinates: 13.32607°N 39.17393°E

Gijet massacre
- Part of Tigray War
- Location of Gijet in Tigray (Ethiopia)
- Location: Gijet (Tigrinya: ጊጀት), Tigray Region, Ethiopia
- Date: 30 December 2020
- Target: Tigrayans
- Attack type: Mass killing; Shelling
- Deaths: 21 civilians
- Perpetrator: (Ethiopia) Ethiopian National Defence Force

The December 2020 Gijet massacre was a mass extrajudicial killing that took place in Gijet (Tigrinya: ጊጀት) in the Tigray Region of Ethiopia during the Tigray War, on 30 December 2020. Gijet is the central town of woreda Saharti, southeastern zone of Tigray.

== Massacre ==
The Ethiopian National Defense Force (ENDF) killed 21 youngsters, including a seven-year-old child in Gijet (SE Tigray) on 30 December 2020.

Typical massacres committed by Ethiopian and Eritrean soldiers in the Tigray war are (1) revenge when they lose a battle; (2) to terrorise and extract information about whereabouts of TPLF leaders; (3) murder of suspected family members of TDF fighters; and (4) terrorising the Tigray society as a whole such as in case of mass killings in churches.

== Perpetrators ==
Dimtsi Woyane reported the perpetrators of this massacre as being the Ethiopian army.

== Victims ==
The “Tigray: Atlas of the humanitarian situation” mentions 21 victims of this massacre.

== Reactions ==
The “Tigray: Atlas of the humanitarian situation”, that documented this massacre received international media attention, particularly regarding its Annex A, that lists massacres in the Tigray War.

After months of denial by the Ethiopian authorities that massacres occurred in Tigray, a joint investigation by OHCHR and the Ethiopian Human Rights Commission was announced in March 2021.

== See also ==
- Murders and massacres in the Tigray War
- Timeline of the Tigray War – December 2020
- February 2021 Saharti-Samre massacres, including another 120 people killed in Gijet
- March 2021 Saharti-Samre massacres, including another 123 people killed in Gijet
