= Gijet massacre =

Numerous massacres took place in and around the town of Gijet (Ethiopia), during the 2020-2021 Tigray War. These include:

- February 2021 Saharti-Samre massacres
- March 2021 Saharti-Samre massacres
