= Samre =

Samre may refer to:

- Pear people, also known as Samre people
- Samre language, spoken by the Samre people
- Samre (woreda), one of the woredas in the Tigray Region of Ethiopia
- Samre, Ethiopia, a town in northern Ethiopia
- Samre, Bangkok, a subdistrict and neighbourhood in Thon Buri District, Bangkok, Thailand
