= Emmanuel Mwamba =

Zambian politician

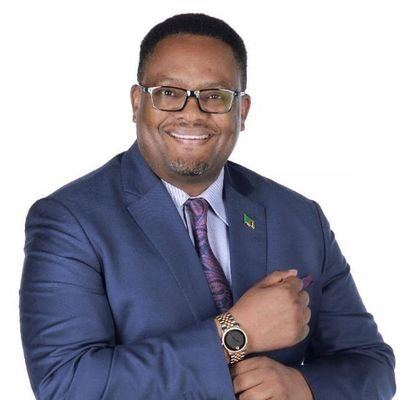
- Mwamba in 2023

Personal details
- Born: 18 April 1971 (age 55) Luanshya, Zambia
- Party: Patriotic Front
- Education: Edith Cowan University, Institute of Peace & Security Studies, Addis Ababa University, Evelyn Hone College
- Occupation: Diplomat

Emmanuel Mwamba (born 18 April 1971) is a Zambian diplomat. He was born in Luanshya, Copperbelt Province, Zambia where he attended Roan Antelope Secondary School. He went on to attend Evelyn Hone College where he obtained a Diploma in Journalism and Public Relations.

Emmanuel Mwamba proceeded to study for a Masters in Business Administration at Edith Cowan University, Perth, Australia and for a Master in Peace Studies at Institute of Peace & Security Studies, Addis Ababa University.

Emmanuel Mwamba has worked at Zambia National Commercial Bank and the Civil Service in the Administrator Office of the Second President of Zambia (Frederick Chiluba) as an administrative secretary and spokesperson. Further on he was assigned to government posts as Permanent Secretary for Northern Province, Permanent Secretary for Eastern Province, Permanent Secretary for Western Province, Permanent Secretary in the Ministry of Information and Broadcasting Services and Permanent Secretary in the Cabinet Office.

Emmanuel Mwamba was appointed to be Zambia's High Commissioner to South Africa and his last placement was Zambia's Ambassador to Ethiopia, Permanent Representative to the African Union, and Permanent Representative to the United Nations Economic Commission for Africa. He is on the list of Zambia Diplomats.
