= Haddush Addi =

Haddush Addi may refer to:

- The Haddush Addi massacre near Wukro Maray in Tigray in 2021
- The village of Haddush Addi in Seret (Dogu'a Tembien) in Tigray
