= Julia Duncan-Cassell =

Liberian politician

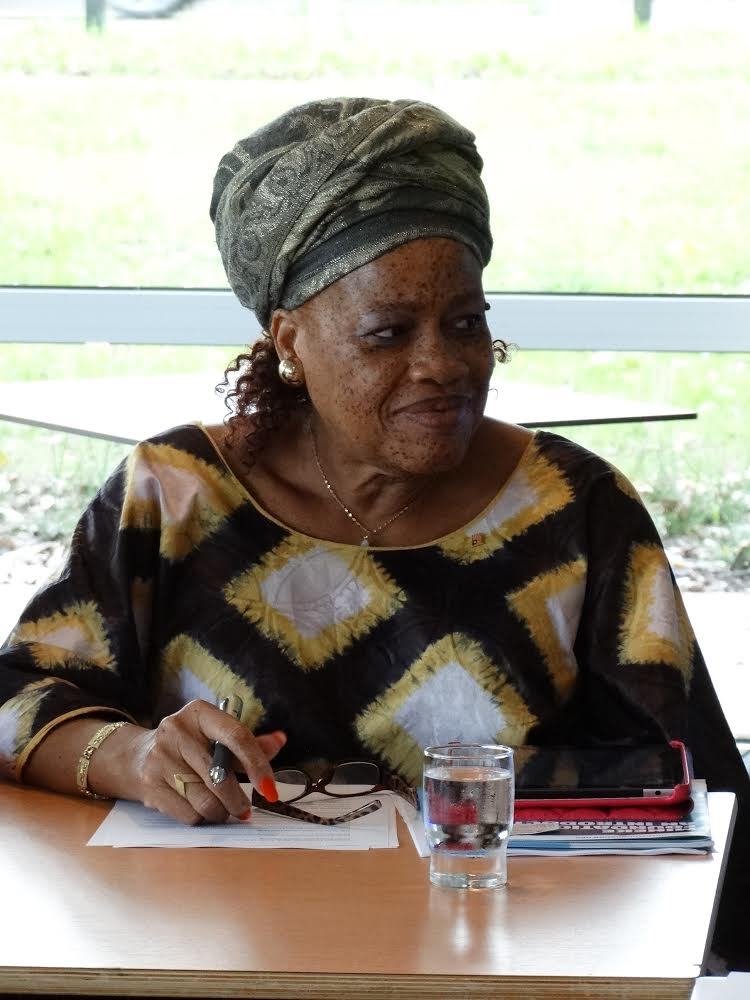
Julia Duncan-Cassell at a conference in the Netherlands in 2014

Julia Duncan-Cassell (born 1960) is a Liberian politician. She served as minister of gender, children, and social protection from 2012 to 2018, as part of President Ellen Johnson Sirleaf's second cabinet.

== Biography ==
Duncan-Cassell was born in 1960. She fled the First Liberian Civil War and settled in the United States. There, she studied business at the University of Phoenix, College of Marin, and Prairie View A&M University. She worked in banking in California before returning to Liberia.

Back in Liberia, Duncan-Cassell became involved in the country's postwar political scene. She was the first woman to serve as superintendent of Grand Bassa County, holding the position for six years, until 2012.

In 2012, President Ellen Johnson Sirleaf appointed her as minister of gender, children, and social protection. She served in the role until 2018, with a brief break from July to October 2017, when she ran a failed campaign to represent Grand Bassa County District #3 in the Liberia House of Representatives. As minister, she promoted women's engagement in politics, opposed violence against women, and oversaw care of Ebola orphans during the West African Ebola epidemic.

Duncan-Cassell is a member of Liberia's Unity Party. She currently serves as president of the Europe External Programme with Africa.
