= Ataklti Haile Selassie =

Ethiopian politician

mayor of Mekelle
- In office 2020–2021

Ataklti Haile Selassie (also Atakilty, Haileselassie, Haileselasie, Hailesellassie) is an Ethiopian who was appointed mayor of Mekelle following the Mekelle offensive of the November 2020 Tigray War. He resigned from the mayorship on 30 March 2021.

== Academia ==
In mid-2020, Ataklti was Corporate Communications Director at Mekelle University.

== Politics ==
Ataklti was one among six independent candidates in the 2020 Tigray regional election who withdrew their candidatures in the election. He stated that his candidature was based on the assumption of free air time on regional media and coverage of printing costs by the regional electoral commission. Ataklti argued that COVID-19 pandemic restrictions prevented door-to-door campaigns, so without radio, television or print access to campaigning, he had no chance to present his electoral platform to voters.

=== Mayorship of Mekelle ===
Ataklti was appointed mayor of Mekelle in mid-December 2020 under the Transitional Government of Tigray, several weeks after the Mekelle offensive of the November 2020 Tigray conflict. On 17 December, Ataklti claimed that the city would return "to full normalcy within a short time". Direct elections for the membership of the Mekelle City Council were planned following Ataklti's nomination.

In late March, an explosion that appeared to be an attempt to assassinate Ataklti took place when he was heading to his car after having breakfast.

Ataklti's mayorship terminated on 30 March 2021. Mulu Nega, the head of the Transitional Government of Tigray, claimed that Ataklti was dismissed. Ataklti claimed that a dismissal letter was written by Mulu in an attempt to override Ataklti's decision to resign.

Ataklti stated that three main reasons for his resignation were the failure of the Transitional Government to travel outside of Mekelle to solve Tigray-wide problems, an issue of military intervention in municipal decision-making regarding land investment and in municipal personnel decisions, and an issue that Ataklti saw as nepotism and bribery. Ataklti felt that the situation of Mekelle had vastly improved during his leadership, stating that "transport, private businesses, and all public services [were] restored back to normal with the exception of education" by the time of his resignation. He said that the "100-days evaluation matrix" used for evaluation of administrative actions by the Transitional Administration rated his performance highly, giving no objective reasons to dismiss him.
