= Ziban Gedena massacre =

2020 massacre in Ziban Gedena, northwestern Tigray as part of the Tigray War

Coordinates: 14.28219°N 37.89176°E

- Part of Tigray War
- Location of Ziban Gedena in Tigray (Ethiopia)
- Location: Ziban Gedena (Tigrinya: ዝባን ገደና), Tigray Region, Ethiopia
- Date: 4 to 7 December 2020
- Target: Tigrayans
- Attack type: Mass killing; Ethnic cleansing
- Deaths: 150-300 civilians
- Perpetrator: (Eritrea) Eritrean Defence Forces

The Ziban Gedena massacre was a mass extrajudicial killing that took place in Ziban Gedena (Tigrinya: ዝባን ገደና) in the Tigray Region of Ethiopia during the Tigray War, on 4 to 7 December 2020. Ziban Gedena is a village that belongs to woreda Tahtay Adiyabo, northwestern zone of Tigray.

== Massacre ==
The Eritrean Defence Forces (EDF) killed 150 up to 300 civilians in Ziban Gedena (NW Tigray) on 4 to 7 December 2020.

In the town of Ziban Gedena, in northwestern Tigray, Eritrean soldiers had burned 150 houses, killed 300 civilians, looted or slaughtered 90% of oxen and livestock, burnt and stolen harvests and set fire to animal fodder. Continuing harassment from Eritrean forces meant that no one was plowing the land for the next crop, farmers told aid workers. — Anonymous UN official, notes from a UN briefing after a June 6 visit, Reuters, 11 June 2021

== Perpetrators ==
A UN report indicates that the perpetrators of this massacre were Eritrean soldiers.

== Victims ==
The “Tigray: Atlas of the humanitarian situation” mentions approximately 150 victims of this massacre, whereas a UN report mentions 300 civilian victims. Four victims have been identified.

== Reactions ==
The “Tigray: Atlas of the humanitarian situation”, that documented this massacre received international media attention, particularly regarding its Annex A, that lists massacres in the Tigray War.

After months of denial by the Ethiopian authorities that massacres occurred in Tigray, a joint investigation by OHCHR and the Ethiopian Human Rights Commission was announced in March 2021.

While the Ethiopian government promised that Eritrean troops will be pulled out from Tigray, the Eritrean government denies any participation in warfare in Tigray, let alone in massacres.

For this specific massacre, Eritrean and Ethiopian officials did not respond to questions. Billene Seyoum, spox of the Ethiopian prime minister Abiy Ahmed denied that farmers were prevented from ploughing.

== See also ==
- Murders and massacres in the Tigray War
- Timeline of the Tigray War – December 2020
