= Transitional Government of Tigray =

Caretaker administration imposed following the Tigray War (2020–2023)

- ትግራይ ክልል የሽግግር መንግሥት

Overview
- Established: 7 November 2020
- Dissolved: 28 June 2021
- Polity: Tigray Region
- Leader: Chief Executive Officer
- Appointed by: Abiy Ahmed
- Responsible to: House of Federation of Ethiopia

The Transitional Government of Tigray was a caretaker administration that was formally declared by the House of Federation of Ethiopia on 7 November 2020, in the context of a conflict between the Tigray People's Liberation Front (TPLF), in power in the Tigray Regional State and the federal government of Ethiopia. In late November 2020, the administration, headed by Mulu Nega, planned public consultation and participation in choosing new leaders at the regional and zonal level and preservation of woreda and kebele administrations. The Transitional Government fled Tigray in late June 2021 during Operation Alula.

== Background ==
In March 2018 Hailemariam Desalegn, Prime Minister of Ethiopia, resigned in favour of reforms that intended to lead to sustainable peace and democracy, ceding power to a government led by Abiy Ahmed. Abiy tried to unite all the regional political parties in a single centralized political party. The TPLF, the dominant party in the Ethiopian People's Revolutionary Democratic Front (EPRDF), refused, and the Prosperity Party was created as a merger of three other EPRDF member parties. During the COVID-19 pandemic, the National Election Board of Ethiopia postponed a federal election planned for later in 2020. The TPLF established its own regional electoral board for holding a Tigrayan region election, which the House of Federation (HoF) objected to. The Tigray regional election was held on 9 September 2020 with the TPLF winning all of the seats contested and 98.2% of the vote.

On 5 October 2020, the Tigray Region authorities urged federal government officials to resign and join the Tigrayan government. Most of the TPLF House of Peoples' Representatives members resigned. On 7 October 2020 the HoF decided to stop any relationship the federal government has with the Tigray regional state assembly and the region's highest executive body. The HoF cut budget subsidies to the state, banned all federal institutions from sending letters and information to Tigray's higher executive bodies or providing support to their institutions and prohibited the region from participating in national level forums. The Tigray government described this as a declaration of war against the region.

During November 2020, the conflict between the federal and Tigrayan authorities became a military conflict, with federal forces claiming to have occupied the regional capital Mekelle by late November 2020.

=== Constitutional context ===
Article 62, 9 grants HoF the right to "order Federal [government] intervention if any State [government], in violation of [the] Constitution, endangers the constitutional order."

== Creation of the transitional government ==
Abiy Ahmed stated to the Ethiopian Broadcasting Corporation on 4 November 2020 that the Ethiopian National Defense Force, which was camped in the area of Mekelle, was attacked by the Tigray Special Forces. The TPLF stated that the attack was pre-emptive. Following this, the Ethiopian federal government started an operation to take action that it described as aiming to restore the rule of law and declared a six-month state of emergency in Tigray. The HoF then allowed the federal government to intervene into Tigray and formed the Tigray Transitional Government.

== Leadership and structure ==
From around 13 November 2020 to 6 May 2021, the chief executive officer of the Tigray Transitional Government was Mulu Nega. According to EEPA, Mulu Nega handed in a resignation letter in late January 2021, stating that the transitional administration had no power to respond to "the plight of the people of Tigray who are starving to death and sexually harassed by foreign forces". On 11 February, Mulu held talks with Ahunna Eziakonwa of the United Nations Development Program on cooperation in reconstructing Tigray Region and briefed the media, continuing in his position as head of the transitional government. On 6 May 2021, Mulu's replacement by Abraham Belay as the new head of the Transitional Government was announced by the federal authorities.

As of 28 November 2020, the creation of the government was coordinated by "five people". The Ethiopian news service Borkena stated in late November that "ethnic Tigreans" would lead the Transitional Government.

Mulu Nega stated that the transitional government structure would be defined by a charter to be completed in December 2020 and approved by the Federal Attorney General. As of 28 November, the plan was for regional level and zonal level leadership to be changed, while "maintaining woreda and kebele administrations intact". Public consultations and public participation in "the selection of officials appointed to lead institutions" were planned.

On 15 December 2020, Mulu announced that members of Tigrayan opposition parties, including Arena Tigray, Tigray Democratic Party (TDP) and Assimba Democratic Party (ADP), would be appointed to "leadership positions in the regional cabinet and various high level positions at the regional administration".

Abraha Desta, Chairperson of Arena Tigray, became Head of the Bureau of Labor and Social Affairs. In February 2021, he described his membership of the transitional government as contingent and motivated by humanitarian reasons. He stated that he did not support the federal government nor oppose the TPLF. He promised to resign, to publicly oppose the federal government, and to "fight" to get land back if any "square metres of land [are] taken from Tigray".

On 16 December 2020, Assefa Bekele, was nominated as the Head of the Roads and Transport Bureau by the region's Transitional government. Alula Habteab was head of the Construction, Roads and Transport Bureau in late February 2021.

=== Dismissals ===
Alula Habteab was dismissed from his Construction, Roads and Transport Bureau position in mid-March 2021. EEPA stated the likely reason for the dismissal as Alula's public statement in February 2021 that the EDF, ENDF and Amhara Region forces had "completely destroyed 30 years" of infrastructure development in Tigray Region.

Amdom Gebreselassie, vice head of the Public Relations Bureau, was also dismissed from his position in mid-March 2021. EEPA stated the likely reason for the dismissal as Amdom's earlier statements calling for an independent investigation into the war crimes in the Tigray War and his statement that Amhara forces and the EDF were involved in the war crimes.

Amdom stated that the two dismissals were decisions by the federal Ethiopian government. He attributed his own dismissal as being a result of his call for legal action against the perpetrators of sexual violence in the Tigray War and a public statement made by Arena Tigray, of which he heads public relations. Amdom described the dismissals as "undemocratic" and limiting Transitional Government officials' freedom of action. Amdom claimed that the Transitional Government leadership internally agreed on fundamental issues, but disagreed on whether to state their opinions publicly or keep them private.

== Powers ==
Mulu Nega stated that the four main powers of the transition administration would be:

- recreating regional executive institutions;
- appointing regional and zonal leaders guided by public consultations, but not woreda and kebele leaders;
- "ensuring law and order";
- running the 2021 Ethiopian general election as mandated by the National Election Board of Ethiopia (NEBE);

The administration would also be empowered to "actively [implement] tasks assigned to it by the federal government".

=== Excluded powers ===
As of 28 November 2020, the resolution of land claim disputes, expected for historical reasons in the "Raya, Telemt and Wolkait areas", were excluded from the planned powers of the transitional administration.

== Territorial control ==
On 3 February 2021, Mark Lowcock, the head of the United Nations Office for the Coordination of Humanitarian Affairs (OCHA), stated that federal Ethiopian authorities controlled about 60% to 80% of the Tigray Region and that forces allied with the ENDF were "pursuing their own goals". On 7 February 2021, Alex de Waal said that "much" of Tigray Region was controlled by the EDF according to United Nations and United States sources, while Ethiopian and Eritrean authorities denied that the EDF had any territorial control in the Tigray Region.

=== Mekelle ===
On 15 December 2020, the appointment of a mayor for Mekelle was announced by Mulu. The mayor was later named as Ataklti Haile Selassie. According to Addis Standard, Ataklti resigned from the mayorship on 30 March 2021.

=== Amhara Region ===
Amhara Region authorities took over administrative control of parts of Tigray Region. As of 1 March 2021, several geographical places had been renamed by the new authorities and many residents of Tigrayan ethnicity had been deported by the new authorities to Central Zone.

==== Mi'irabawi Zone (west) ====
As of 23 November 2020, the conquered Tigrayan town of Humera in Mi'irabawi Zone (Western Tigray) was administered by officials and security forces from Amhara Region. According to a refugee from Humera, Gush Tela, the Fano vigilante youth group took control of a judicial court in Humera.

By 10 January 2021, according to Europe External Programme with Africa (EEPA), the zone as a whole was divided by its Amharan administration into Telemt (Tselemti), with May Tebri (May Tsebri) as its capital and Humera–Welqayt–Tegede zone, with Humera as capital.

As of 10 January 2021, the new head of Humera–Welqayt–Tegede zone was Yeabsira Eshete, and the administration was composed of ethnic Amharans, according to EEPA. EEPA stated that ethnic Tigrayan civilians were deported from western Tigray to central Tigray by bus and their houses immediately occupied by Amharans. In early February, the transitional government confirmed that the western zone was run by the Amhara Region administration. According to VOA-Tigrigna, on 17 March 2021, Etenesh Nigusse, head of Communications in the Transitional Government stated that more than 700,000 Tigrayans had been forcibly removed by Amhara Special Forces from Western Zone. According to Wazema Radio on the following day, the Federal Emergency Proclamation task force had not confirmed the number of people forcibly removed and the Regional Government of Amhara denied the claim of forcible removals.

==== Debubawi Zone (south) ====
On 16 December 2020, Mulu appointed Million Aberah as the Chief executive officer of Debubawi Zone. In early February, the transitional government confirmed that the southern zone was run by Amhara Region.

=== Eritrean Defence Forces ===
==== Semien Mi'irabawi Zone (northwest) ====
On 2 December 2020, Mulu claimed that residents of the kebeles in Shire Inda Selassie, a woreda in Semien Mi'irabawi Zone (North West Tigray), each elected about 20 representatives, who together elected 25 members forming a new Woreda Council. The Council elected five of its members as its Cabinet. Mulu stated that a mayor of the woreda was elected. In early February 2021, the transitional government stated that the presence of the Eritrean Defence Forces (EDF) in the northwest zone "added to the challenge" of administering the zone.

==== Misraqawi Zone (east) ====
In early February 2021, the transitional government stated that the presence of the EDF in the eastern zone "added to the challenge" of administering the zone.

=== Other ===
As of 14 February 2021, administrative control of Debub Misraqawi Zone (southeast) and of the part of Maekelay Zone south of the Shire–Adigrat road was unclear.

== Departure from Tigray ==
The Transitional Government fled Tigray in late June 2021 during Operation Alula, in which the Tigray Defense Forces took control of Mekelle.

Debretsion Gebremichael was de facto president of Tigray Region from 28 June 2021, following Operation Alula, to March 2023. On 23 March 2023, as part of the November 2022 Ethiopia–Tigray peace agreement, a new transitional government, the Interim Regional Administration of Tigray, to be headed by Getachew Reda, was declared by the Prime Minister's Office.

== List of Chief Executive Officers of the Transitional Government of Tigray ==
- Mulu Nega (13 November 2020–6 May 2021)
- Abraham Belay (6 May 2021–28 June 2021)

== See also ==
- Tigray conflict
- 2020 in Ethiopia
- Interim Regional Administration of Tigray
