= Zamr massacre =

Massacre in Zamr, Eastern Tigray as part of Tigray war

Coordinates: 14.270044263915251°N 39.250045972633394°E

- Part of Tigray War
- Location of Zamr in Tigray (Ethiopia)
- Location: Zamr (Tigrinya: ዛምር), Tigray Region, Ethiopia
- Date: 3 March 2021
- Target: Tigrayan youth
- Attack type: Mass killing; Ethnic cleansing
- Deaths: 7 civilians
- Perpetrator: (Eritrea) Eritrean Defence Forces

The Zamr massacre was a mass extrajudicial killing that took place in Zamr (Tigrinya: ዛምር) in the Tigray Region of Ethiopia during the Tigray War, on 3 March 2021. Zamr is a village that belongs to tabiya Simret, woreda Bizet, Eastern zone of Tigray.

== Massacre ==
The Eritrean Defence Forces (EDF) killed seven civilian youngsters in Zamr (Central Tigray) on 3 March 2021.

== Perpetrators ==
AssenaTV reported the perpetrators of this massacre as being Eritrean soldiers.

== Victims ==
The “Tigray: Atlas of the humanitarian situation” mentions seven victims of this massacre, all of whom have been identified.

== Reactions ==
The “Tigray: Atlas of the humanitarian situation”, that documented this massacre received international media attention, particularly regarding its Annex A, that lists massacres in the Tigray War.

After months of denial by the Ethiopian authorities that massacres occurred in Tigray, a joint investigation by OHCHR and the Ethiopian Human Rights Commission was announced in March 2021.

While the Ethiopian government promised that Eritrean troops will be pulled out from Tigray, the Eritrean government denies any participation in warfare in Tigray, let alone in massacres.
