= Mulugeta Gebrehiwot =

Ethiopian peace researcher and politician

- Education: Doctor of Philosophy
- Alma mater: University of Victoria
- Occupation: Researcher
- Employer: Tufts University
- Political party: Ethiopian People's Revolutionary Democratic Front

Mulugeta Gebrehiwot Berhe is an Ethiopian peace researcher who as of 2021, was a senior fellow at the World Peace Foundation, Tufts University. He was a rebel of the Ethiopian People's Revolutionary Democratic Front (EPRDF) when the EPRDF was a guerilla army. He led the disarmament, demobilization and reintegration program of the 380,000 armed rebels after the EPRDF gained control of Ethiopia in 1991. Mulugeta was a mediator in the Darfur Peace Agreement negotiations that led to the 2006 Abuja Agreement and the 2011 Doha Agreement during peace process for the War in Darfur. He was founding Director of the Institute for Peace and Security Studies in 2007. In January 2021 during the Tigray War, Mulugeta, telephoning from the mountains in Tigray Region, described the killings of civilians by the Eritrean Defence Forces (EDF) and the Ethiopian National Defense Force (ENDF) as "genocide by decree".

== Education ==
Mulugeta graduated with a bachelor of arts from the Amsterdam Business School in 2002, a master of business administration from the Open University in 2003, a master of public administration at Harvard Kennedy School in 2005. He obtained his PhD at the University of Victoria in 2018 with his thesis, From left-wing liberation army into a government: the challenges of transition and the case of TPLF/EPRDF, on the history of the Tigray People's Liberation Front (TPLF) and the Ethiopian People's Revolutionary Democratic Front starting from their role as rebels through to their transition to and running of the government of Ethiopia.

== Rebel fighter ==
Mulugeta was active in the EPRDF in 1976, shortly after it was created as a rebel movement, and became a founding member of the EPRDF Council in 1990. He remained an EPRDF member through to 2002.

== Transition to democracy ==
=== Disarmament and demobilisation commissioner ===
Mulugeta headed the Disarmament and Demobilization Commission (DDR commission) for the first ten years of TPLF/EPRDF's control of Ethiopia, starting in 1991. According to Mulugeta, the Commission successfully integrated 78,000 short-term conscripted soldiers from rural areas; 170,000 long-term rural conscripts; 100,000 urban soldiers; and 30,000 disabled veterans. Mulugeta argued that the DDR program was larger and more successful than similar programs following other armed conflicts in Africa.

=== Constituent Assembly ===
He was elected to the 1994 Ethiopian Constituent Assembly that drafted the 1995 Constitution of Ethiopia.

== International mediator ==
Mulugeta advised the chief mediator in peace negotiations for the War in Darfur that led to the 2006 Abuja Agreement. He worked with United Nations–African Union Mission in Darfur (UNAMID) in the negotiations that led to the 2011 Doha Agreement, the second major agreement of the Darfur peace process.

== Peace research ==
Mulugeta was the founding Director of the Institute for Peace and Security Studies in 2007. In 2014, he negotiated a research and training cooperation agreement with Rwanda Peace Academy. He is a senior fellow and former program director at the World Peace Foundation.

== Research and views ==
Mulugeta saw the TPLF/EPRDF, after taking power in Ethiopia in 1991, as being successful in initiating the creation of the institutions typical of a democratic state, including a judiciary with some degree of independence, a local and national electoral system, minority rights and a constitution. However, according to Mulugeta, the leadership of the EPRDF became less egalitarian than during its role as a revolutionary movement, and more bureaucratised, with a weakening separation between the EPRDF as a political party and the Ethiopian federal state, and strengthening top-down control of the state. The result by 2017 was "rent seeking and corruption" within the elite and the appointment of party loyalists to state institutions. Mulugeta saw the parliament as having rubber-stamp role in confirming new laws, the judiciary as "far from independent", and the media as "below the standard to serve as a fourth pillar of check and balance of power".

In February 2020, Mulugeta argued that by the end of Hailemariam Desalegn's prime ministership, the Ethiopian political system had become a competition for domination with too little cooperation. With Abiy Ahmed becoming prime minister in 2018, Mulugeta saw this as a result of competition rather than consensus-building, and worried that Abiy had amplified the competitive aspect of Ethiopian politics, "alienat[ing] key players in the coalition", leading to a risk of a "complete collapse of the state".

In September 2020, Mulugeta supported the 2020 Tigray regional election as fully justified. He saw the federal government as "fast approaching a failed state" and expressed hope that Ethiopian and international increased awareness of the depth of the crisis might lead to "key stakeholders" seeking a solution.

In late January 2021, during the Tigray War, Mulugeta, telephoning from the mountains in Tigray Region, said that United Arab Emirates (UAE) drones had been a key factor in destroying TPLF heavy weaponry, "disarm[ing] Tigray". He described the TPLF leadership as being "dislocated" and stated that the Eritrean Defence Forces (EDF) and the Ethiopian National Defense Force (ENDF) had "destroyed Tigray, ... burned schools, clinics, ... ransacked each house". He stated that the killing, the worst of which was done by the Eritrean forces, was against "whomever they find in whichever village they get in". He stated that in the small village that he had been in a day earlier, 21 people had been killed by the armed forces. Mulugeta described produce as have been "massively, massively" ransacked by the EDF, leading to a likely humanitarian crisis. Mulugeta described the killings as "genocide by decree", with the ENDF and EDF killing "whomever they find.
