= Saharti Samre =

Coordinates: 13°15′N 39°10′E

Saharti Samre ሰሓርቲ ሳምረ
- Woreda
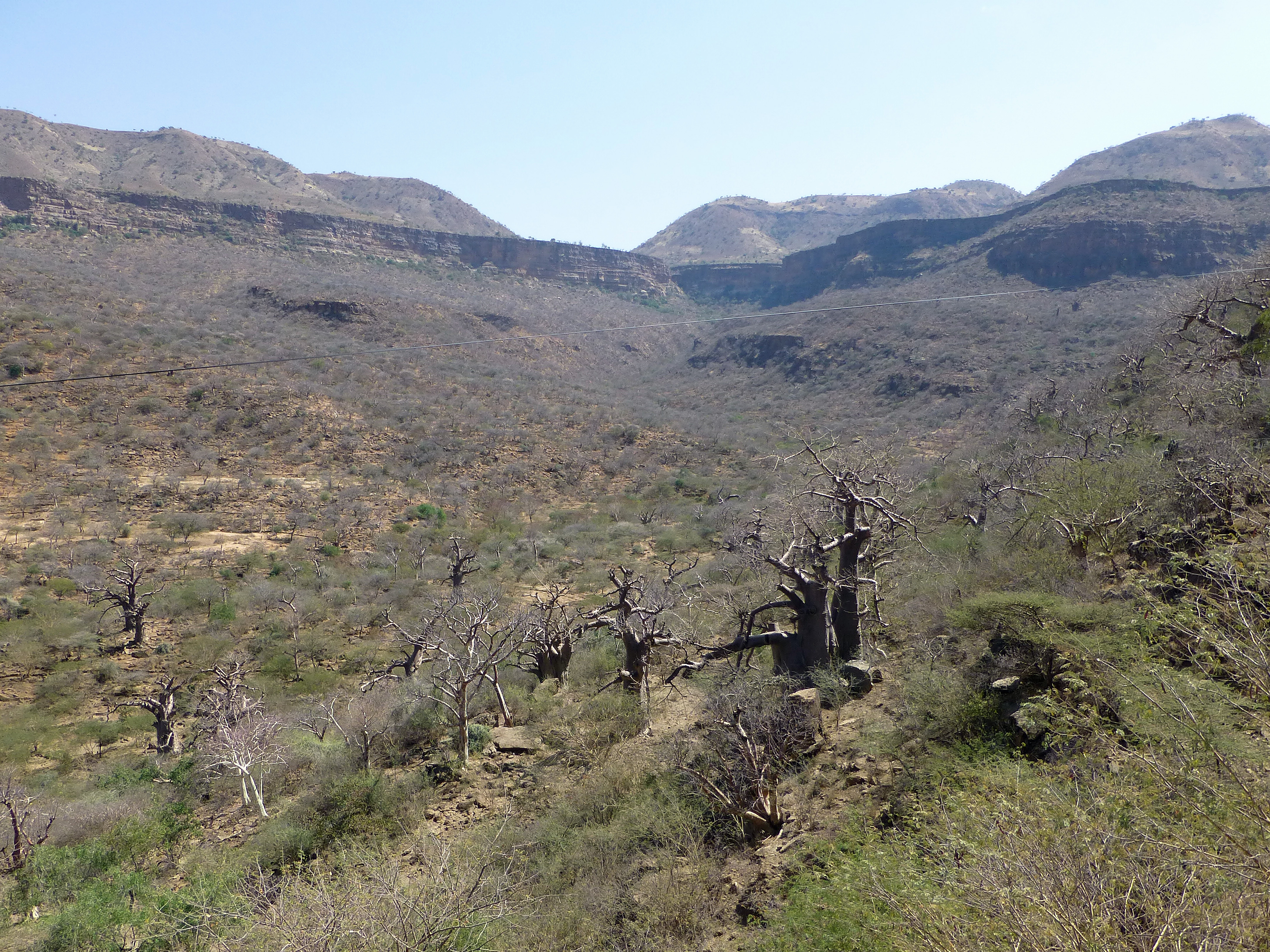

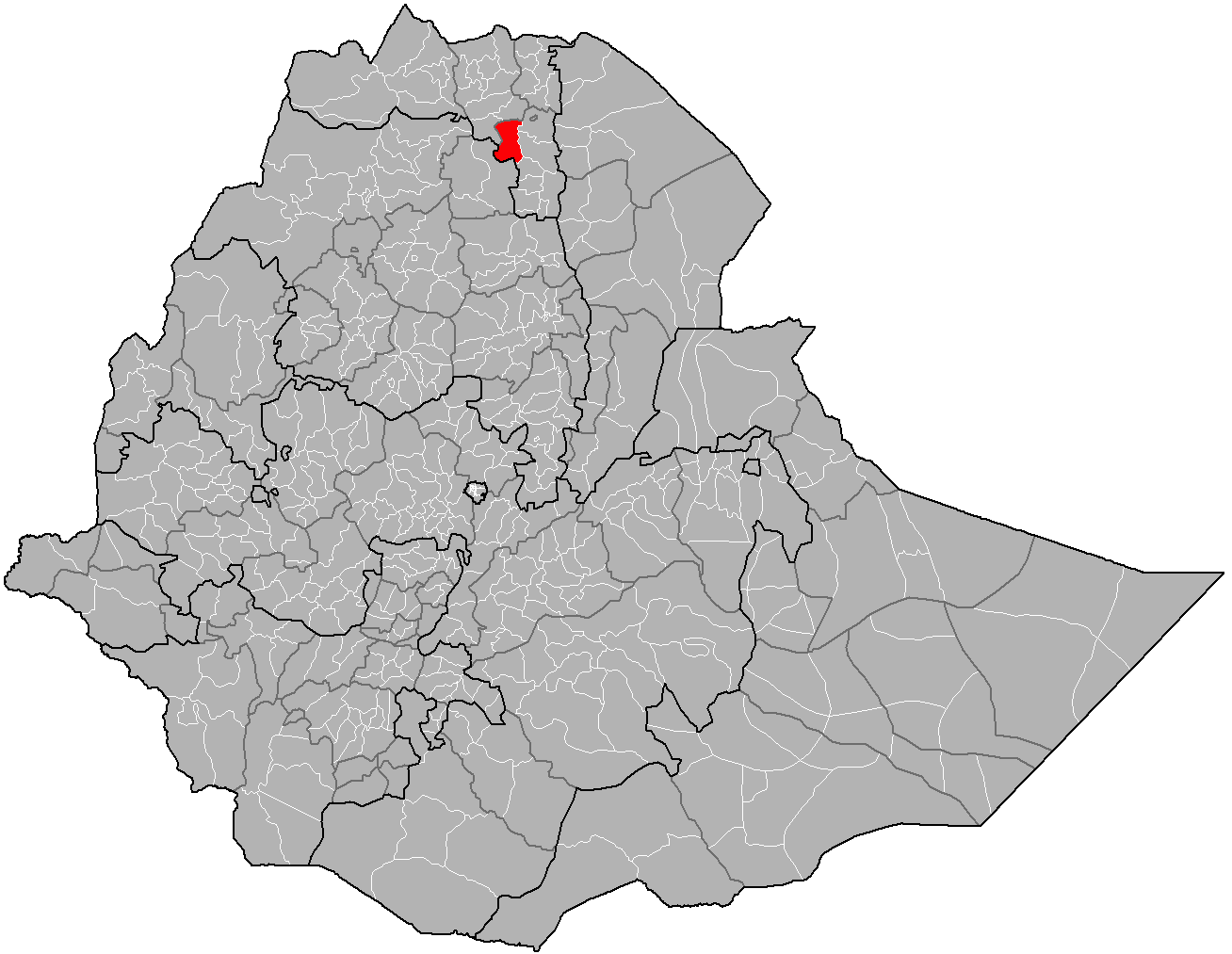
- Country: Ethiopia
- Region: Tigray
- Zone: Debub Misraqawi (Southeastern)

Area
  - Total: 2,723.89 km^{2} (1,051.70 sq mi)

Population (2007)
  - Total: 124,340

Saharti Samre (Tigrinya: ሰሓርቲ ሳምረ) is one of the Districts of Ethiopia, or woredas, in the Tigray Region of Ethiopia. Part of the Debub Misraqawi (Southeastern) Zone, Samre is bordered on the south by the Amhara Region, on the west and north by the Mehakelegnaw (Central) Zone, on the northeast by Enderta, on the east by Hintalo Wajirat, and on the southeast by Debubawi (Southern) Zone. Towns in this woreda include Gijet and Samre.

Rivers in this woreda include the Samre, which is of historical importance as it was the traditional boundary between Tigray Province to the north, and Lasta or Wag to the south. Local points of interest in this woreda include the rock-hewn churches of Arbatu Insesa and Iyasus Hinta.

== History ==
The northern part of the woreda, which is known as Saharti was a separate woreda with Gijet (Tigrinya: ግጀት) as its administrative as well as capital city. At the same time, Samre (Tigrinya: ሳምረ) was the administrative as well as capital city for the district or wereda of 'Wea'areb' (Tigrinya: ወዓረብ), which is the area consisting of the southern part of the currently merged wereda of 'Saharti Samre' (Tigrinya: ሠሓርቲ ሳምረ).

Saharti appears on indigenous maps of the northern Horn of Africa in the 15th century.

Historically, both Saharti with its capital city of Gijet as well as Wea'areb with its capital city of Samre have been an integral part of Enderta province, when Enderta was a province (awraja) until the start of the 1990s.

== Demographics ==
Based on the 2007 national census conducted by the Central Statistical Agency of Ethiopia (CSA), this woreda has a total population of 124,340, an increase of 40.18% over the 1994 census, of whom 61,868 are men and 62,472 women; 9,189 or 7.39% are urban inhabitants. With an area of 2,723.89 square kilometers, Samre has a population density of 45.65, which is less than the Zone average of 53.91 persons per square kilometer. A total of 26,461 households were counted in this woreda, resulting in an average of 4.70 persons to a household, and 25,837 housing units. 98.63% of the population said they were Orthodox Christians, and 1.36% were Muslim.

The 1994 national census reported a total population for this woreda of 88,701, of whom 44,103 were men and 44,598 were women; 4,038 or 4.55% of its population were urban dwellers. The two largest ethnic groups reported in Samre were the Tigrayan (98.43%), and the Agaw Kamyr (1.12%); all other ethnic groups made up 0.45% of the population. Tigrinya was spoken as a first language by 98.35%, and 1.12% spoke Kamyr; the remaining 0.53% spoke all other primary languages reported. 98.24% of the population practiced Ethiopian Orthodox Christianity, and 1.52% were Muslim. Concerning education, 6.57% of the population were considered literate, which is less than the Zone average of 15.71%; 6.21% of children aged 7–12 were in primary school; 0.13% of the children aged 13–14 were in junior secondary school; and a negligible number of the inhabitants aged 15–18 were in senior secondary school. Concerning sanitary conditions, about 47% of the urban houses and 12% of all houses had access to safe drinking water at the time of the census; about 6% of the urban and about 2% of the total had toilet facilities.

== Agriculture ==
A sample enumeration performed by the CSA in 2001 interviewed 22,957 farmers in this woreda, who held an average of 1.47 hectares of land. Of the 33,649 hectares of private land surveyed, 91.52% was in cultivation, 0.15% pasture, 6.34% fallow, and 1.98% was devoted to other uses. For the land under cultivation in Samre, 81.56% was planted in cereals, 7.52% in pulses, 2.11% in oilseeds, and 10 hectares in vegetables. The area planted in fruit trees was 53 hectares, while 31 were planted in gesho. 82.22% of the farmers both raised crops and livestock, while 16.16% only grew crops and 1.62% only raised livestock. Land tenure in this woreda is distributed amongst 81.27% owning their land, and 18.37% renting; the number held in other forms of tenure is missing.

== 2020 woreda reorganisation ==
In 2020, woreda Samre Saharti became inoperative and its territory belongs to the following new woredas:

- Samre (new, smaller, woreda)
- Saharti woreda
- Selewa woreda
