= Institute for Peace and Security Studies =

Ethiopia-based think tank

- Abbreviation: IPSS
- Established: 2007
- Type: Think Tank
- Headquarters: Addis Ababa University
- Leader: Dr. Kidane Kiros, Ms. Michelle Ndiaye
- Staff: 50
- Website: ipss-addis.org

Established in 2007, the Institute for Peace and Security Studies (IPSS) of Addis Ababa University (AAU) was created as a centre for teaching, research and outreach activities. It received further stimulation when the African Peace and Security Programme (APSP), a partnership programme between IPSS and the African Union (AU), was launched in 2010.

IPSS provides recognized academic education and professional training in conflict analysis, prevention, management and resolution. It also conducts academic and applied research in the area of peace and security.

The IPSS is the alma mater of Ethiopian Prime Minister and Nobel Peace laureate Abiy Ahmed, who stated that he completed his PhD dissertation at IPSS in 2017.

== Creation ==
The Institute for Peace and Security Studies was founded by Mulugeta Gebrehiwot in 2007.

== Africa Peace and Security Programme (APSP) ==
APSP's activities and projects are aimed at enhancing African capacity (both the AU and Regional Economic Communities/Mechanisms) in the area of peace and security. They also line up to IPSS teaching, research and outreach strategic objectives. The programmatic focus and activities of IPSS are, therefore, the cumulative programmes of both the Institute and APSP. APSP receives substantial technical and financial support from the Deutsche Gesellschft fur Internationale Zusammenarbeit (GIZ) GmbH, the Austrian Development Agency (ADA), other development partners and members of the African private sector.

== Tana High-Level Forum on Security in Africa ==
IPSS serves as the secretariat for the Tana High-Level Forum on Security in Africa. Taking place each April in Ethiopia, the Forum convenes heads of state, academics, the private sector and policymakers for two days of debate and discussions. The first Forum took place in 2012 in Bahir Dar, Ethiopia.

== Partners ==
Among others, the Institute is supported by the African Union, Regional Economic Communities (RECs)/Regional Mechanisms (RMs), development partners, the private sector, think tanks/universities, programme/project development partners and embassies.
