= Mulu Nega =

Ethiopian academic and politician

Mulu Nega Kahsay

Chief Executive Officer of the Transitional Government of Tigray
- In office 13 November 2020 – 6 May 2021; Disputed with Debretsion Gebremichael
- Prime Minister: Abiy Ahmed
- Preceded by: Debretsion Gebremichael
- Succeeded by: Abraham Balay

State Minister of Science and Higher Education
- Incumbent
- Assumed office 6 May 2020
- Prime Minister: Abiy Ahmed

Personal details
- Born: 15 November 1967 (age 58)
- Children: 3
- Education: Addis Ababa University (MA, BA); University of Twente (PhD)
- Awards: Recognition certificate from African Initiative

Mulu Nega Kahsay (born 15 November 1967) is an Ethiopian academic and politician. Mulu Nega was one of the federal Ethiopian State Ministers of Science and Education in 2020. In November 2020 during the Tigray conflict, the House of Federation appointed Mulu Nega to replace Debretsion Gebremichael, chief executive of Tigray Region, with Mulu Nega becoming chief executive of the Transitional Government of Tigray. He held the position through to May 2021.

== Childhood and education ==
Mulu was born on 15 November 1967. He obtained his PhD from the University of Twente in 2012, with a thesis titled, "Quality and quality assurance in Ethiopian higher education: critical issues and practical implications".

== Research and teaching ==
Mulu was appointed assistant professor at Institute of Educational Research at Addis Ababa University in 2002.

== Politics ==
Mulu became State Minister of Science and Higher Education in Ethiopia on 6 May 2020.

Avatar of Abiy Ahmed Ali

Abiy Ahmed Ali
(@AbiyAhmedAli)
tweeted:

On the basis of the decision of the House of Federation and the Council of Ministers Regulation "Concerning the Provisional Administration of the Tigray National Regional State", Dr. Mulu Nega has been appointed as the Chief Executive of the Tigray Regional State. 1/2

12 November 2020

During the Tigray conflict in November 2020, Mulu Nega was appointed as chief executive of the Transitional Government of Tigray by the House of Federation to replace Debretsion Gebremichael of the Tigray People's Liberation Front as President of the Tigray Region. He appeared publicly on 11 February, after holding talks with Ahunna Eziakonwa of the United Nations Development Program on cooperation in reconstructing Tigray Region, in his role as head of the transitional government.

== Personal life ==
Mulu is married and has three children.

== Bibliography ==
- Current Issues in Ethiopian Private Higher Educational Institutions: Opportunities and Challenges
