= Samre, Ethiopia =

Town in Tigray Region, Ethiopia

Samre
- Town
- Location within Ethiopia
- Coordinates: 13°11′N 39°12′E
- Country: Ethiopia
- Region: Tigray
- Zone: Debub Misraqawi (south-eastern)
- Woreda: Saharti Samre
- Elevation: 1,855 m (6,086 ft)

Population (2005)
  - Total: 3,712
- Time zone: UTC+3 (EAT)

Samre is a town in northern Ethiopia. Located in the Debub Misraqawi (south-eastern) Zone of the Tigray Region, this town has a latitude and longitude of 13°11′N 39°12′E with an elevation of 1855 meters above sea level. It is one of two towns in Saharti Samre woreda.

== History ==
The Royal Chronicle of Emperor Yohannes I mentions Samre as one of the settlements involved in the 1677 revolt of Fares and Zamaryam. The town is mentioned again in an inquiry conducted by Emperor Iyasu I in 1698, in which he proclaimed that tolls should no longer be collected there.

When Charles Beke left Ethiopia, his path took him through Samre (April 1843). He wrote that it was the residence of the governor of "Salowa", and the location of "the salt-market of Tigre, in direct correspondence with Sókota in Lasta". When Augustus B. Wylde passed through Samre in the late 1890s, the town had declined since the death of its resident lord, one Ras Hailu. The late Ras's palace, one of the largest structures Wylde had seen in Ethiopia, was reduced to ruins, and its market, which had been so busy to require daily sessions, now met once a week on Saturdays.

During the Ethiopian Civil War, units of the Tigray People's Liberation Front held Samre from 20 June through 22 1988 against the Ethiopian 16th Division in a delaying action against the government's Operation Adwa.

== Demographics ==
Based on figures from the Central Statistical Agency in 2005, Samre has an estimated total population of 3,712 of whom 1,748 are men and 1,964 are women. The 1994 census reported it had a total population of 2,138 of whom 931 were men and 1,207 were women.
