= Europe External Programme with Africa =

Non-governmental organization

- Abbreviation: EEPA
- Types: international non-governmental organization
- Aim: human rights
- Headquarters: City of Brussels
- Country: Belgium
- Budget: 277,000 euro (2019)
- Revenue: 277,202 euro (2019)
- Employees: 7 (2021)
- Website: www.eepa.be

The Europe External Programme with Africa and Europe External Policy Advisors, both called EEPA, are two closely associated Belgian-based non-governmental organizations that aim to encourage the European Union's involvement in human rights in general (EEPA/Advisors) and, in particular, in the Horn of Africa and North Africa (EEPA/Africa).

== Creation and history ==
Europe External Policy Advisors (EEPA/Advisors) states that it was created in 2003. It was registered with the European Commission in July 2015 with ID number 719135118053-50, as an international Belgian-based non-governmental organization (AISBL). Europe External Programme with Africa (EEPA/Africa) was registered with the European Commission in January 2018 with ID number 574620429651-88. In 2020, the two organisations shared their street address, website and the EEPA acronym.

== Leadership and structure ==
Mirjam van Reisen, an international relations and human rights professor at Tilburg University, is stated by EEPA/Advisors to have been its founding director in 2003. In 2020, van Reisen continued to be the director of EEPA/Advisors and was the secretary-general of EEPA/Africa.

As of March 2024, EEPA/Africa's president was Julia Duncan-Cassell.

In May 2020, EEPA/Advisors had three part-time employees and in January 2021, EEPA/Africa had seven part-time employees. Neither had persons accredited to access the European Parliament (EP).

Eritrean human rights lawyer Daniel Mekonnen states that he worked for EEPA/Africa during 2016–2018.

== Aims ==
EEPA/Advisors describes its aims as influencing European foreign policy supporting development and human rights. EEPA/Africa describes it aims as using research and distribution of information to promote human rights and justice in Africa, especially in the Horn of Africa and North Africa, and by influencing European Union (EU) actions and policy towards Africa.

== Actions ==
EEPA/Africa published daily situation reports on the Tigray War starting on 17 December 2020. Its 18 December report stated that the Negash mosque had been "first bombed and later looted by Ethiopian and Eritrean troops".
