= Gijet =

- Town
- Location within Ethiopia
- Coordinates: 13°19′N 39°10.5′E
- Country: Ethiopia
- Region: Tigray
- Zone: Debub Misraqawi Zone
- Woreda: Saharti Samre
- Elevation: 2,070 m (6,790 ft)
- Time zone: UTC+3 (EAT)

Gijet is a town in southern Tigray, Ethiopia. This town has a latitude and longitude of 13°19′N 39°10.5′E with an elevation of 2070 to 2100 meters above sea level. Gijet is the largest settlement in the Saharti Samre district. During the Imperial era, Gijet was the center of the Saharti woreda. Since 2020, it is again the centre of the new Saharti woreda.
