= 21st-century genocides =

Overview of genocides from 2000

Genocide is the intentional destruction of a people (Note: Defined under the Genocide Convention as "national, ethnical, racial, or religious group.") in whole or in part. The term was coined in 1944 by Raphael Lemkin. It is defined in Article 2 of the Convention on the Prevention and Punishment of the Crime of Genocide (CPPCG) of 1948 as "any of the following acts committed with intent to destroy, in whole or in part, a national, ethnical, racial, or religious group, as such: killing members of the group; causing serious bodily or mental harm to members of the group; deliberately inflicting on the group conditions of life calculated to bring about its physical destruction in whole or in part; imposing measures intended to prevent births within the group; [and] forcibly transferring children of the group to another group."

The preamble to the CPPCG states that "genocide is a crime under international law, contrary to the spirit and aims of the United Nations and condemned by the civilized world", and it also states that "at all periods of history genocide has inflicted great losses on humanity." Genocide is widely considered to be the epitome of human evil, and has been referred to as the "crime of crimes". The Political Instability Task Force estimated that 43 genocides occurred between 1956 and 2016, resulting in 50 million deaths. The UNHCR estimated that a further 50 million had been displaced by such episodes of violence.

== Definitions of genocide ==
The debate continues over what legally constitutes genocide. One definition is any conflict that the International Criminal Court has so designated. Mohammed Hassan Kakar argues that the definition should include political groups or any group so defined by the perpetrator. He prefers the definition from Frank Chalk and Kurt Jonassohn, which defines genocide as "a form of one-sided mass killing in which a state or other authority intends to destroy a group so defined by the perpetrator."

In literature, some scholars have popularly emphasized the role that the Soviet Union played in excluding political groups from the international definition of genocide, which is contained in the Genocide Convention of 1948, and in particular they have written that Joseph Stalin may have feared greater international scrutiny of the political killings that occurred in the country, such as the Great Purge; however, this claim is not supported by evidence. The Soviet view was shared and supported by many diverse countries, and they were also in line with Raphael Lemkin's original conception, (Note: By 1951, Lemkin was saying that the Soviet Union was the only state that could be indicted for genocide; his concept of genocide, as it was outlined in Axis Rule in Occupied Europe, covered Stalinist deportations as genocide by default, and differed from the adopted Genocide Convention in many ways. From a 21st-century perspective, its coverage was very broad, and as a result, it would classify almost any gross human rights violation as a genocide, and many events that were deemed genocidal by Lemkin did not amount to genocide under the convention. As the Cold War began, this change was the result of Lemkin's turn to anti-communism in an attempt to convince the United States to ratify the Genocide Convention.) and it was originally promoted by the World Jewish Congress.

== 1994–2017: Chechen genocide ==
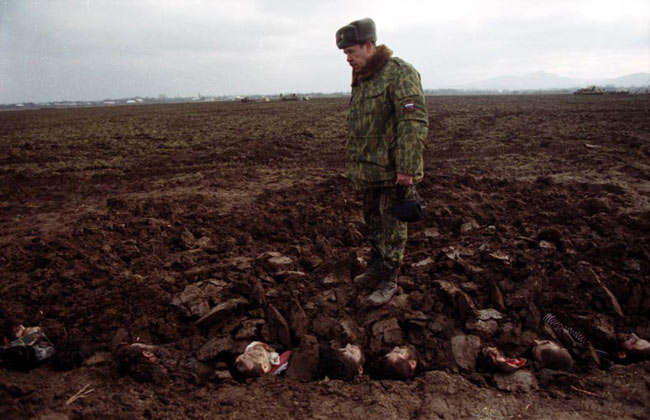
A Russian soldier stands on an open mass grave of Chechens shortly after the Komsomolskoye massacre

Following the dissolution of the Soviet Union in 1991, Chechnya declared its independence from the Russian Federation. Russian president Boris Yeltsin refused to accept Chechnya's independence; subsequently, the conflict between Chechnya and the Russian Federation escalated until it reached its climax when Russian troops invaded Chechnya and launched the First Chechen War in December 1994, and in September 1999, they invaded Chechnya again and launched the Second Chechen War. By 2009, Chechen resistance was crushed and the war ended with Russia re-establishing its control over Chechnya. Numerous war crimes were committed during both conflicts. Amnesty International estimated that in the First Chechen War alone, between 20,000 and 30,000 Chechens were killed, mostly in indiscriminate attacks which were launched against them by Russian forces in densely populated areas, and that a further 25,000 civilians died in the Second Chechen War.

Some scholars estimated that the Russian government's brutal attacks against such a small ethnic group amounted to a crime of genocide. The German-based NGO Society for Threatened Peoples accused the Russian authorities of genocide in its 2005 report on Chechnya. On 18 October 2022, Ukraine's parliament condemned the "genocide of the Chechen people" during the First and Second Chechen War.

== 1983–2009: Tamil genocide ==
The Sri Lankan military was accused of committing human rights violations during Sri Lanka's 26-year civil war. A United Nations' Panel of Experts looking into these alleged violations found "credible allegations, which if proven, indicate that serious violations of international humanitarian law and international human rights law were committed by both the Government of Sri Lanka and the LTTE, some of which would amount to war crimes and crimes against humanity". Some activists and politicians also accused the Sri Lankan government which is dominated by Sinhalese people (who predominantly practice Theravada Buddhism) of carrying out a genocide against the minority Sri Lankan Tamil people, who are mostly Hindu, both during and after the war.

=== Protests and allegations of genocide ===
In 2009, thousands of Tamils protested against the atrocities in cities all over the world. (See 2009 Tamil diaspora protests.) Various diaspora activists formed a group called Tamils Against Genocide to continue the protest. Legal action against Sri Lankan leaders for alleged genocide has been initiated. Norwegian human rights lawyer Harald Stabell filed a case in Norwegian courts against Sri Lankan President Rajapaksa and other officials.

Bruce Fein alleged that Sri Lanka's leaders committed genocide, along with Tamil Parliamentarian Suresh Premachandran. Refugees who escaped from Sri Lanka also stated that they fled from genocide, and various Sri Lankan Tamil diaspora groups echoed these accusations.

Politicians in the Indian state of Tamil Nadu also made accusations of genocide. In 2008 and 2009 the Chief Minister of Tamil Nadu M. Karunanidhi repeatedly appealed to the Indian government to intervene to "stop the genocide of Tamils", while his successor J. Jayalalithaa called on the Indian government to bring Rajapaksa before international courts for genocide. The women's wing of the Communist Party of India, passed a resolution in August 2012 finding that "Systematic sexual violence against Tamil women" by Sri Lankan forces constituted genocide, calling for an "independent international investigation".

=== Judicial investigation, court findings, and governmental resolutions ===
In January 2010, a Permanent Peoples' Tribunal (PPT) held in Dublin, Ireland, found Sri Lanka guilty of war crimes and crimes against humanity, but it found insufficient evidence to justify the charge of genocide. The tribunal requested a thorough investigation as some of the evidence indicated "possible acts of genocide". Its panel found Sri Lanka guilty of genocide at its 7–10 December 2013 hearings in Berman, Germany. It also found that the US and UK were guilty of complicity. A decision on whether India, and other states, had also acted in complicity was withheld. PPT reported that LTTE could not be accurately characterised as "terrorist", stating that movements classified as "terrorist" because of their rebellion against a state, can become political entities recognised by the international community. The International Commission of Jurists stated that the camps used to intern nearly 300,000 Tamils after the war's end may have breached the convention against genocide.

In 2015, Sri Lanka's Tamil majority Northern Provincial Council (NPC) "passed a strongly worded resolution accusing successive governments in the island nation of committing 'genocide' against Tamils". The resolution asserts that "Tamils across Sri Lanka, particularly in the historical Tamil homeland of the Northeast, have been subject to gross and systematic human rights violations, culminating in the mass atrocities committed in 2009. Sri Lanka's historic violations include over 60 years of state sponsored anti-Tamil pogroms, massacres, sexual violence, and acts of cultural and linguistic destruction perpetrated by the state. These atrocities have been perpetrated with the intent to destroy the Tamil people, and therefore constitute genocide."

The Sri Lankan government denied the allegations of genocide and war crimes.

== 1998–present: Boko Haram and Fulani herdsman ==
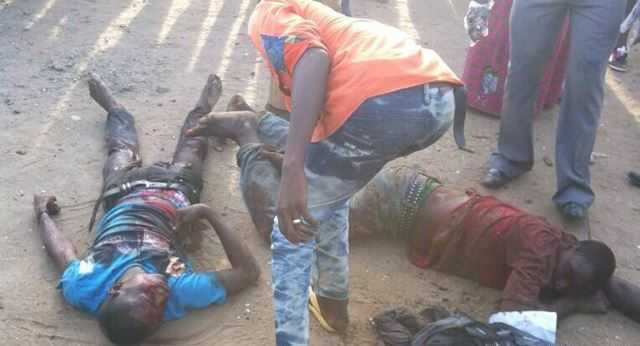
Civilians killed by Boko Haram in Nyanya

Since the turn of the 21st century, 62,000 Nigerian Christians have been killed by the terrorist group Boko Haram, Fulani herdsmen and other groups. The killings have been referred to as a silent genocide.

== 2002–2003: Mbuti people ==
The Democratic Republic of the Congo's Ituri province, where the Effacer le tableau operation occurred

During the Congo Civil War (1998–2003), pygmies, who were considered subhuman, were hunted down and eaten by both of the sides which were involved in the conflict. Sinafasi Makelo, a representative of Mbuti pygmies, asked the UN Security Council to recognise cannibalism as both a crime against humanity and an act of genocide. Minority Rights Group International reported evidence of mass killings, cannibalism and rape. The report, which labeled these events as a campaign of extermination, linked the violence to beliefs about special powers held by the Bambuti. In Ituri district, rebel forces ran an operation code-named "Effacer le tableau" (to wipe the slate clean). The aim of the operation, according to witnesses, was to rid the forest of pygmies.

== 2003–2005: Darfur genocide ==
The Darfur genocide is the systematic killing of ethnic Darfuri people which has occurred during the conflict in Western Sudan. It has become known as the first genocide of the 21st century. The genocide, which was committed against the Fur, Masalit and Zaghawa tribes, led the International Criminal Court (ICC) to indict several people for crimes against humanity, rape, forced transfer and torture. Over 2.8 million civilians have been displaced and the death toll is estimated to number 300,000.

== 2003–2018: South Sudan ==
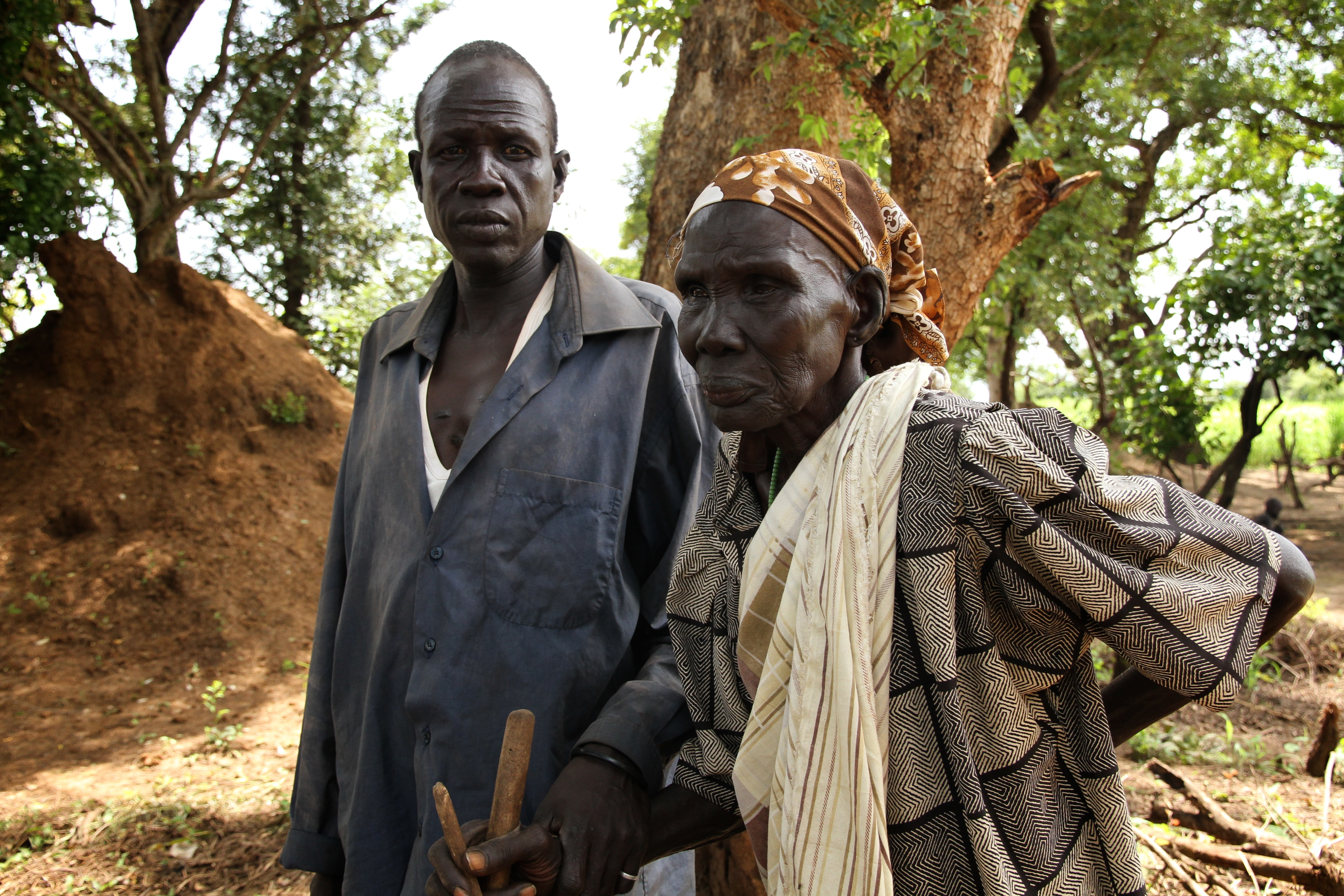
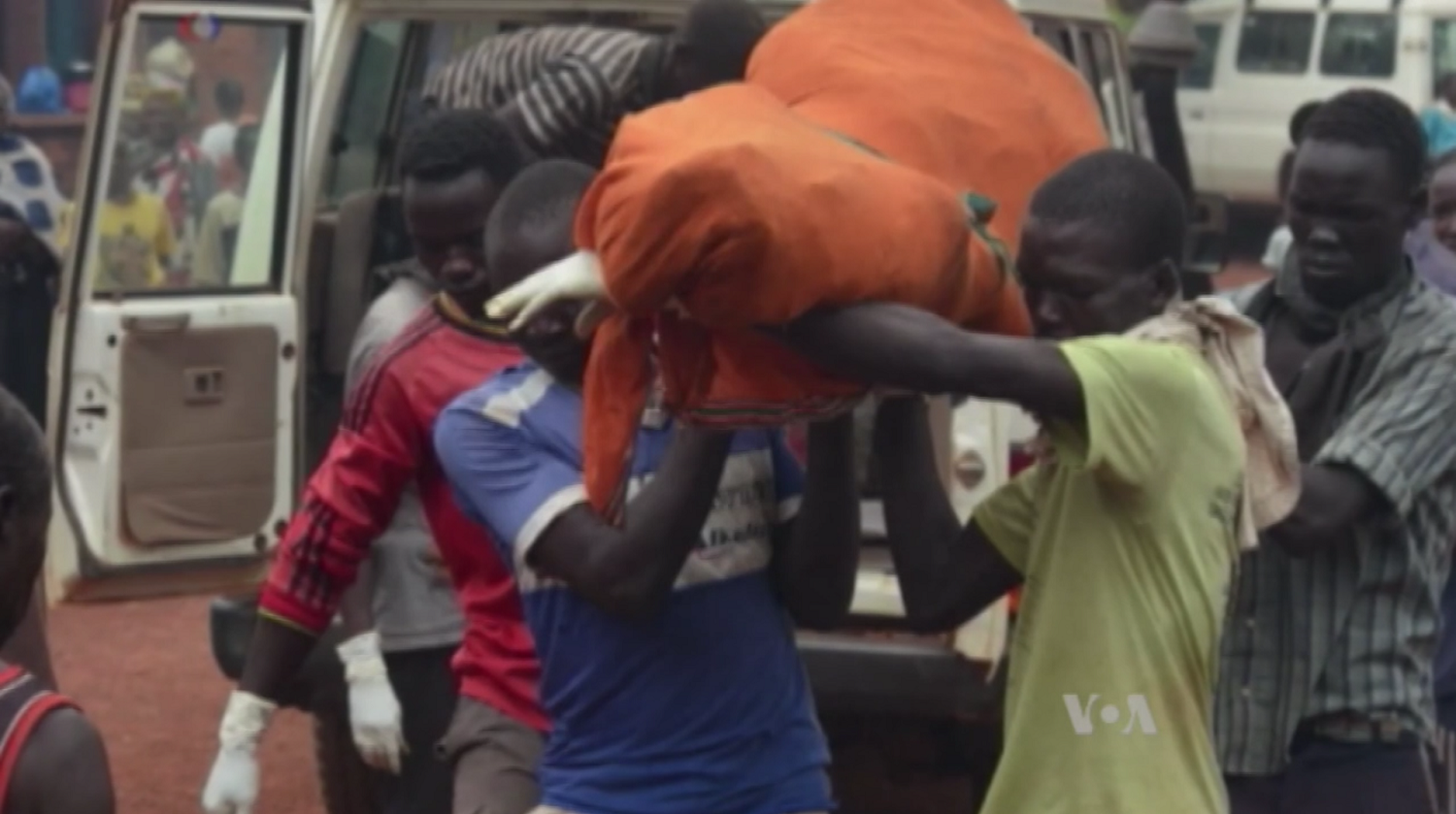
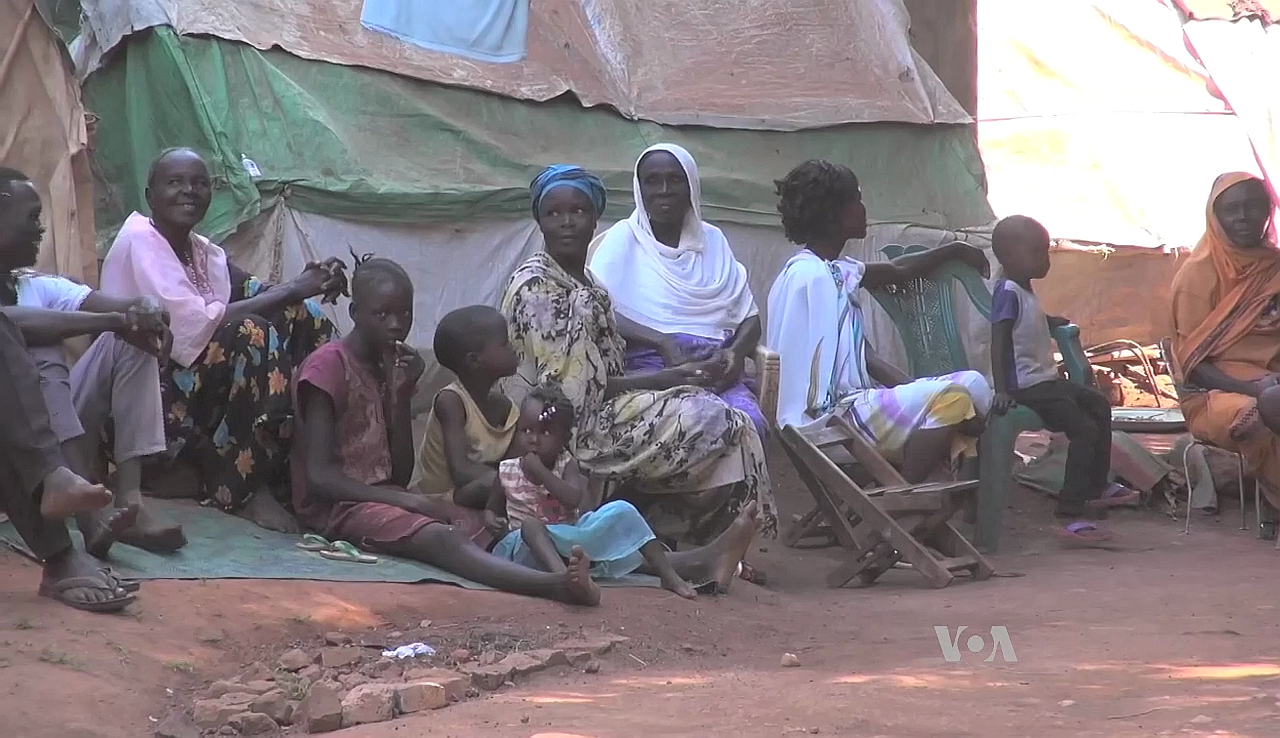
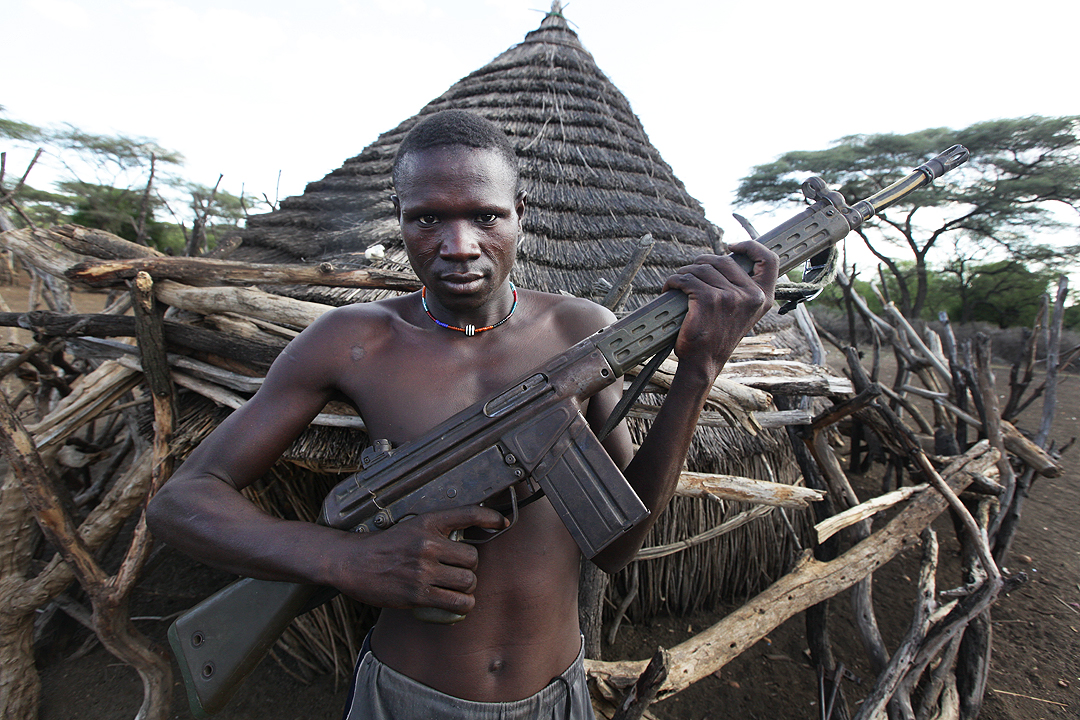
Clockwise from top:
- A South Sudanese mother and her son at a refugee camp in Gambela
- Refugees at a camp at the St. Mary Help of Christians Cathedral of Wau
- Civilian holding a HK G3
- Corpse wrapped in fabric being carried after the Battle of Juba

During the South Sudanese Civil War there were ethnic undertones to the conflict between the South Sudan People's Defence Forces and the Sudan People's Liberation Movement-in-Opposition, which has been accused of being dominated by the Dinka ethnic group. A Dinka lobbying group known as the "Jieng Council of Elders" was often accused of being behind hardline SPLM policies. While the army used to attract men who were members of different tribes, during the war, a large number of the SPLA's soldiers were from the Dinka stronghold of Bahr el Ghazal, and within the country the army was often referred to as "the Dinka army".

Many of the atrocities committed are blamed on a group known as "Dot Ke Beny" (Rescue the President) or "Mathiang Anyoor" (Brown caterpillar), while the SPLA claim that it is just another battalion. Immediately after the alleged coup in 2013, Dinka troops, and particularly Mathiang Anyoor, were accused of carrying out pogroms, assisted by guides, in house to house searches of Nuer suburbs, while similar door to door searches of Nuers were reported in government held Malakal. About 240 Nuer men were killed at a police station in Juba's Gudele neighborhood.

During the fighting in 2016–17 in the Upper Nile region between the SPLA and the SPLA-IO allied Upper Nile faction of Uliny, Shilluk in Wau Shilluk were forced from their homes and Yasmin Sooka, chairwoman of the Commission on Human Rights in South Sudan, claimed that the government was engaging in "social engineering" after it transported 2,000 mostly Dinka people to the abandoned areas. The king of the Shilluk Kingdom, Kwongo Dak Padiet, claimed his people were at risk of physical and cultural extinction. In the Equatoria region, Dinka soldiers were accused of targeting civilians on ethnic lines against the dozens of ethnic groups among the Equatorians, with much of the atrocities being blamed on Mathiang Anyoor.

=== Allegations of genocide ===
Adama Dieng, the U.N.'s Special Adviser on the Prevention of Genocide, warned of genocide after visiting areas of fighting in Yei. Khalid Boutros of the Cobra faction as well as officials of the Murle led Boma State accuse the SPLA of aiding attacks by Dinka from Jonglei state against Boma state, and soldiers from Jonglei captured Kotchar in Boma in 2017. In 2010, Dennis Blair, the United States Director of National Intelligence, issued a warning that "over the next five years... a new mass killing or genocide is most likely to occur in southern Sudan." In April 2017, Priti Patel, the Secretary of State for International Development of the United Kingdom, stated that the violence in South Sudan constituted genocide.

== 2014–present: Uyghurs ==
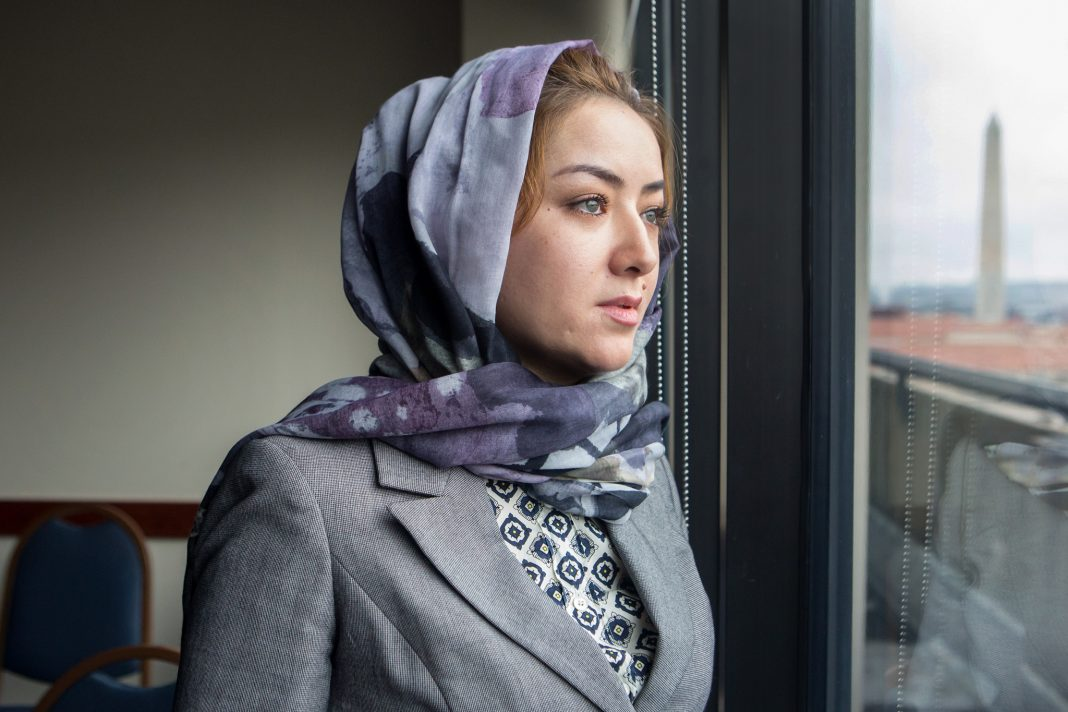
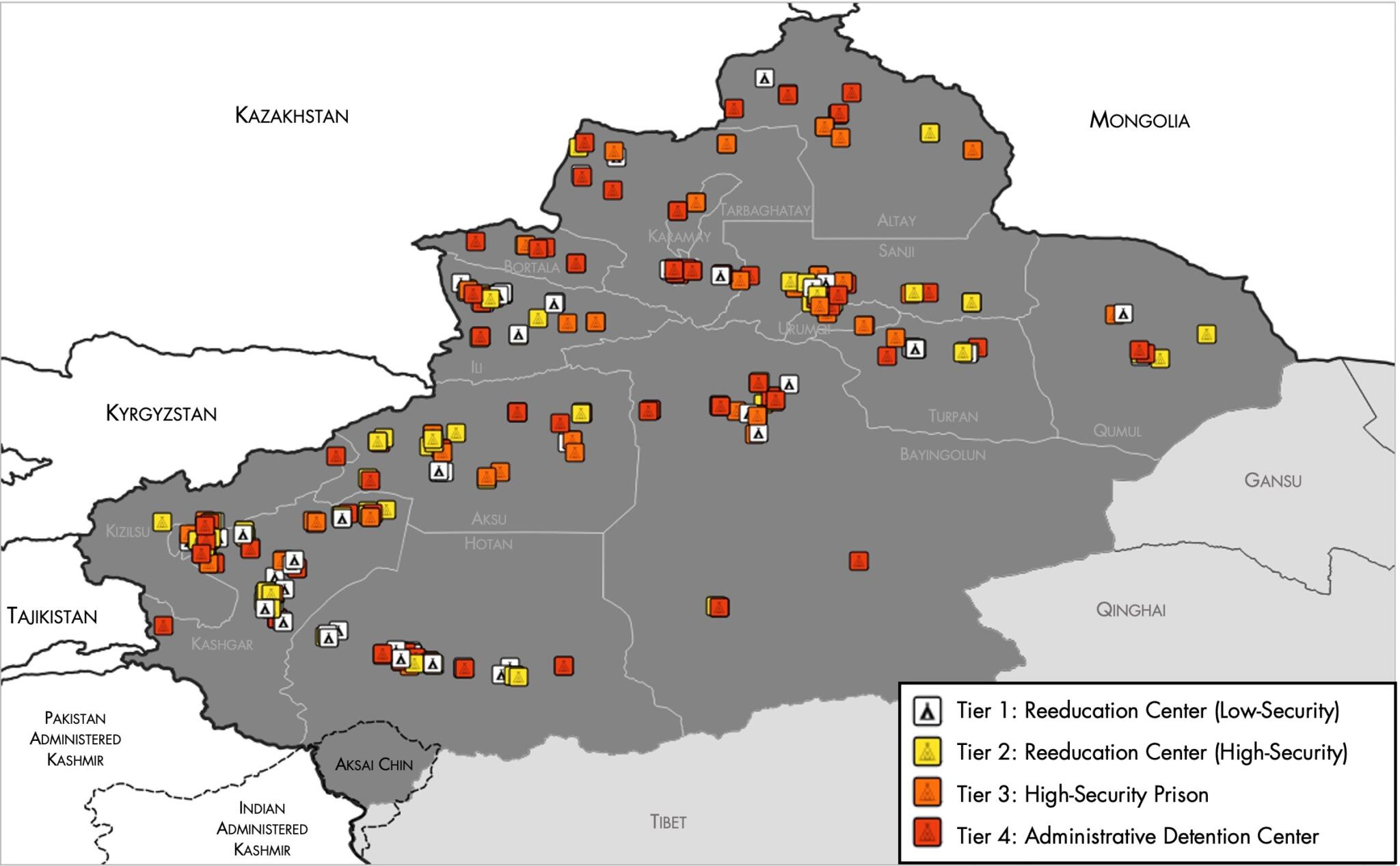
- Top: Mihrigul Tursun, who was formerly detained in a Chinese re-education camp for Uyghur Muslims
- bottom: Location of Xinjiang re-education camps according to analysis by the United States and Australian governments

The Chinese government has committed a series of human rights abuses against Uyghurs and other ethnic and religious minorities which live both in and around the Xinjiang Uyghur Autonomous Region (XUAR) of the People's Republic of China. Since 2014, the Chinese government, led by the Chinese Communist Party (CCP) during the administration of CCP general secretary Xi Jinping, has pursued policies which have led to the internment of more than one million Muslims and they are currently being held in secretive re-education camps without any legal process (the majority of them are Uyghurs) in what has become the largest-scale detention of ethnic and religious minorities since the Holocaust. Critics of the policy have described it as the Sinicisation of Xinjiang and have called it an ethnocide or cultural genocide, while some governments, activists, independent NGOs, human rights experts, academics, government officials, and the East Turkistan Government-in-Exile have called it a genocide.

In particular, critics have highlighted the concentration of Uyghurs in state-sponsored internment camps, suppression of Uyghur religious practices, political indoctrination, severe ill-treatment, and testimonials of alleged human rights abuses including forced sterilisation, contraception, and abortion. Chinese government statistics show that from 2015 to 2018, birth rates in the mostly Uyghur regions of Hotan and Kashgar fell by 84%. In the same period, the birth rate of the whole country decreased by 9.69%, from 12.07 to 10.9 per 1,000 people. Chinese authorities acknowledged that birth rates dropped by almost a third in 2018 in Xinjiang, but denied reports of forced sterilisation and genocide. Birth rates have continued to plummet in Xinjiang, falling nearly 24% in 2019 alone when compared to just 4.2% nationwide.

In July 2020, German anthropologist Adrian Zenz wrote in Foreign Policy that his estimate had increased since November 2019, estimating that a total of 1.8 million Uyghurs and other Muslim minorities had been extrajudicially detained in what he described as "the largest incarceration of an ethnoreligious minority since the Holocaust", arguing that the Chinese Government was engaging in policies in violation of the United Nations Convention on the Prevention and Punishment of the Crime of Genocide. Ethan Gutmann estimated in December 2020 that 5 to 10% of detainees had died each year in the camps.

== 2014–present: Genocides by the Islamic State (ISIL or ISIS) ==
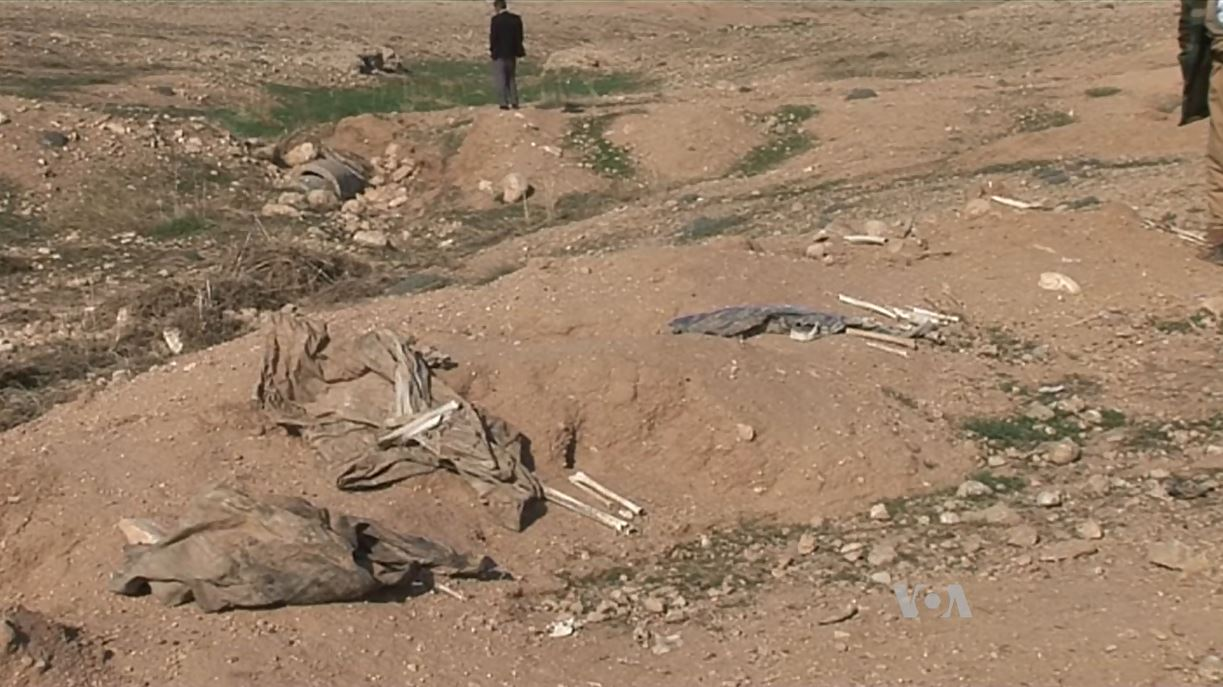
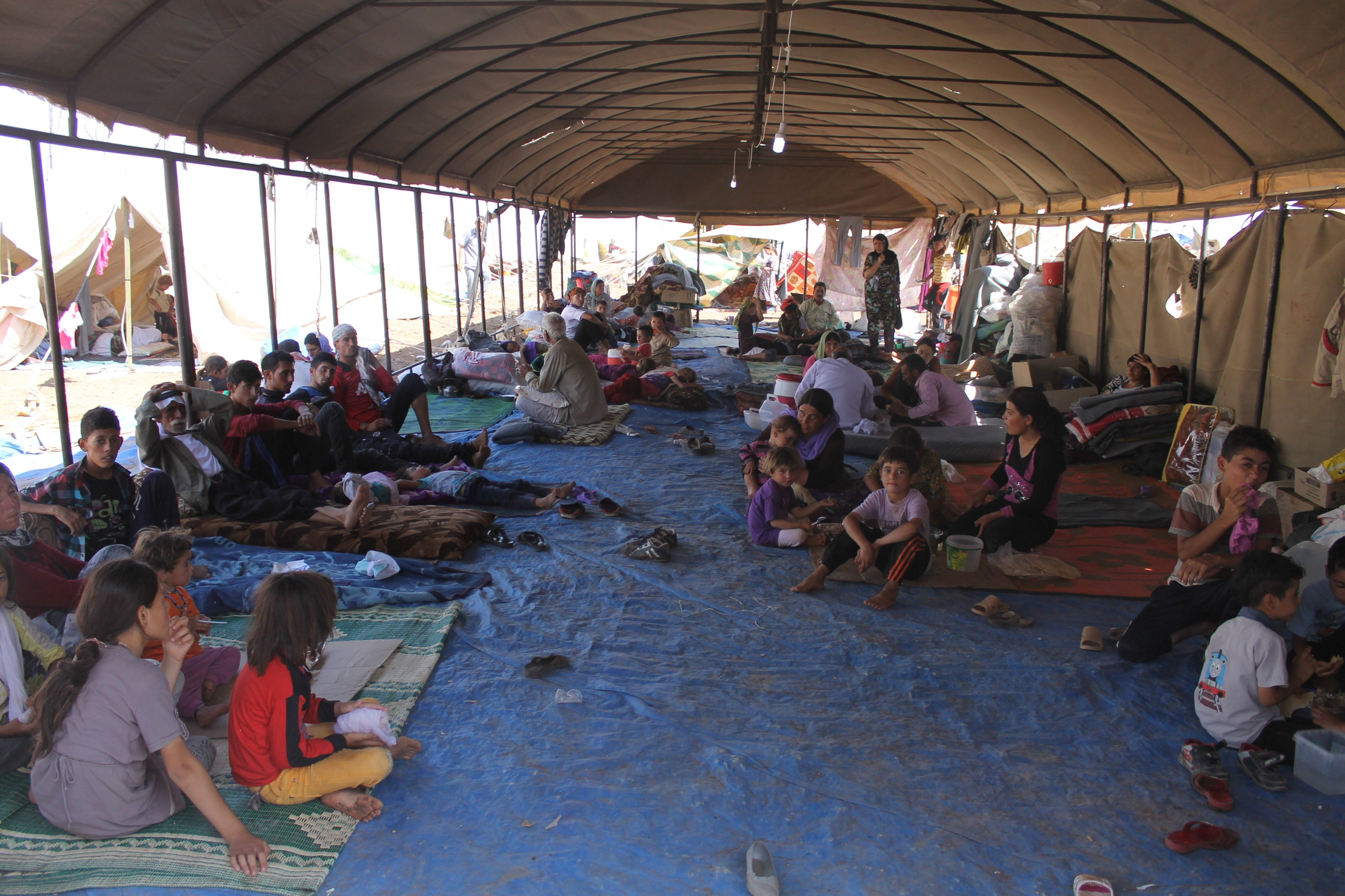
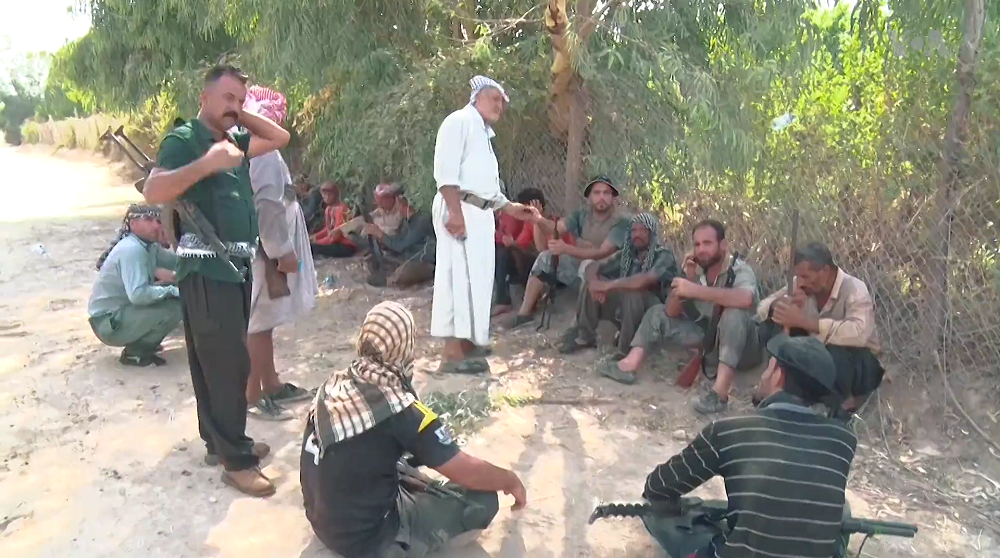
Clockwise from top:
- A mass grave of Iraqi Yazidis in the Sinjar District after a massacre in the region
- Members of an Iraqi Turkmen self-defense group in the Qara Tapa
- Yazidi refugees in Newroz camp

ISIL or ISIS compels people who live in the areas that it controls to live according to its interpretation of sharia law. There have been many reports of the group's use of death threats, torture and mutilation in order to compel people to convert to Islam, as well as reports of clerics being killed for refusing to pledge allegiance to the so-called "Islamic State". ISIL commits violence against Shia Muslims, Alawites, Assyrian and Armenian Christians, Yazidis, Druze, Shabaks and Mandeans in particular.

=== Death tolls of persecuted populations ===
Among the known killings of civilians who were members of religious and other minority groups by ISIL were those killings which ISIL committed in the villages and towns of Quiniyeh (70–90 Yazidis killed), Hardan (60 Yazidis killed), Sinjar (500–2,000 Yazidis killed), Ramadi Jabal (60–70 Yazidis killed), Dhola (50 Yazidis killed), Khana Sor (100 Yazidis killed), Hardan area (250–300 Yazidis killed), al-Shimal (dozens of Yazidis killed), Khocho (400 Yazidis killed and 1,000 abducted), Jadala (14 Yazidis killed) and Beshir (700 Shia Turkmen killed), and others committed near Mosul (670 Shia inmates of the Badush prison killed), and in Tal Afar prison, Iraq (200 Yazidis killed for refusing conversion). The UN estimated that 5,000 Yazidis were killed by ISIL during the takeover of parts of northern Iraq in August 2014. In late May 2014, 150 Kurdish boys from Kobani aged 14–16 were abducted and subjected to torture and abuse, according to Human Rights Watch. In the Syrian towns of Ghraneij, Abu Haman and Kashkiyeh 700 members of the Sunni Al-Shaitat tribe were killed for attempting to launch an uprising against ISIL rule. The UN reported that in June 2014 ISIL had killed a number of Sunni Islamic clerics who refused to pledge allegiance to it. By 2014, a U.N. Humans Rights commission counted that 9,347 civilians had been murdered by ISIL in Iraq, then however; by 2016 a second report by the United Nations estimated 18,802 deaths. The Sinjar massacre in 2014 resulted in the killings of between 2,000 and 5,000 civilians.

== 2015–present: Yemen ==
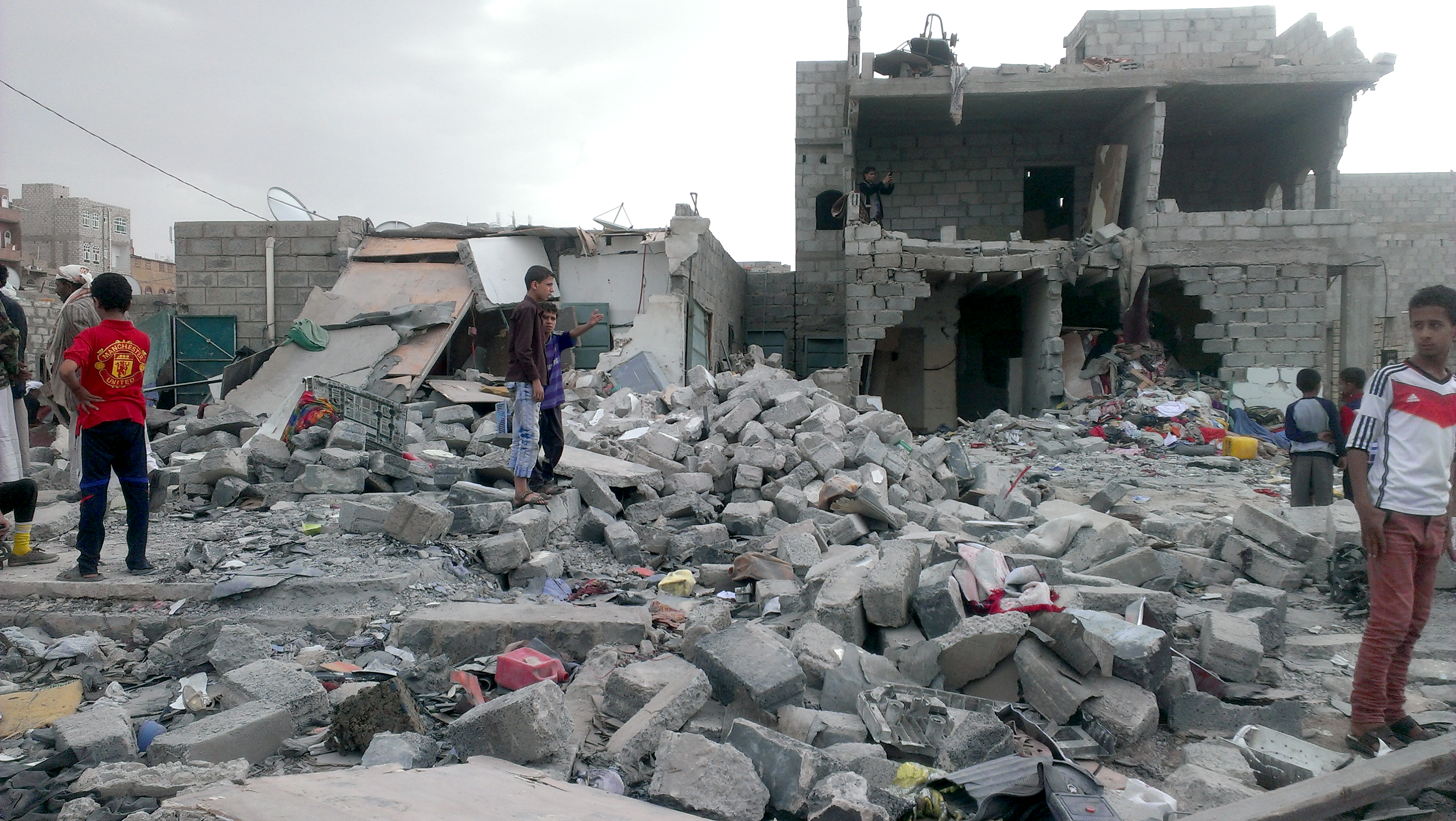
Yemeni capital Sanaa after Saudi-led airstrikes in October 2015

The actions of Saudi Arabia and the UAE in Yemen have been variously described as genocidal. In 2015, coalition forces led by Saudi Arabia and the UAE, intervened in the already ongoing Yemeni Civil War on behalf of the government forces. The intervention has been described as a genocide against Yemenis by some commentators due to war crimes and its role in the humanitarian crisis in Yemen. The Saudi-led campaign had a dramatic worsening effect on the humanitarian crisis in Yemen by contributing to the famine in Yemen. The UN Special Rapporteurs on the Right of Food and for the Prevention of Genocide have called for investigations of Saudi Arabia for crimes against humanity based on their deliberate starvation of the population of Yemen. Over 78% of the population, 20 million people, were in need of humanitarian assistance in 2015 according to the UN. The intervention also contributed to the outbreak of cholera which has infected hundreds of thousands. The blockade of Yemen by Saudi warships which began in 2015 also worsened the situation, leaving the many in without access to food, water and medical aid. Aid to Yemen to relieve the situation was often delayed by the Saudi blockade, leading to further deaths. On 1 July 2015, the UN declared for Yemen a "level-three" emergency—the highest UN emergency level—for a period of six months. By December 2015, 2.5 million Yemeni people were internally displaced by the fighting, and 1 million more fled the country.

The coalition forces have been accused of war crimes, including deliberately targeting civilian areas, including hospitals, schools, refugee camps, and public infrastructure. The entire Saada Governorate was declared a military target by the coalition in May 2015; Human Rights Watch (HRW) later expressed concern that the bombing was causing unnecessarily harming civilians. Cluster munitions, and white phosphorus munitions were reportedly used on multiple occasions by the coalition. In March 2017, HRW reported that "Since the start of the current conflict, at least 4,773 civilians had been killed and 8,272 wounded, the majority by coalition airstrikes. ... Human Rights Watch has documented 62 apparently unlawful coalition airstrikes, some of which may amount to war crimes, that have killed nearly 900 civilians, and documented seven indiscriminate attacks by Houthi-Saleh forces in Aden and Taizz that killed 139 people, including at least eight children."

== 2016–present: Myanmar ==
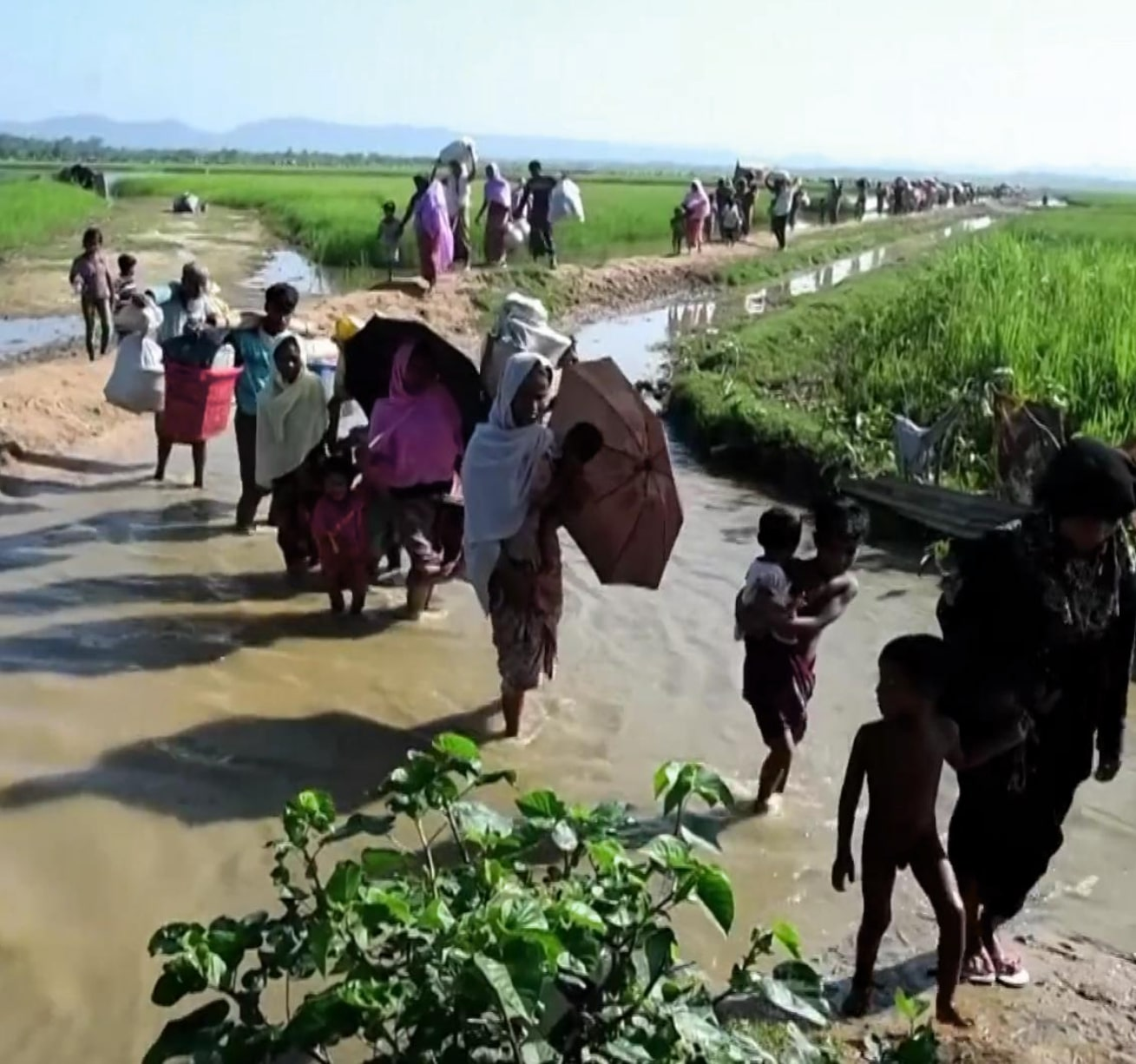
Rohingya refugees entering Bangladesh after being driven out of Myanmar, 2017

Myanmar's government has been accused of committing crimes that are alleged to amount to genocide against the Muslim Rohingya minority. For many years, the Rohingya had been one the primary targets of hate crimes and discrimination in the country, much of which was given tacit encouragement by extremist nationalist Buddhist monks and the military-controlled government. Muslim groups have claimed that they were subjected to genocide, torture, arbitrary detention, and cruel, inhuman, and degrading treatment.

On 25 August 2017, the Myanmar military forces and local Buddhist extremists started attacking the Rohingya people and committing atrocities against them in the country's north-west Rakhine State. The atrocities included attacks on Rohingya people and locations, looting Rohingya villages and burning them down, the mass killing of Rohingya civilians, gang rapes, and other acts of sexual violence. In December 2017, Médecins Sans Frontières (MSF) estimated that during the persecution, the military and local Buddhists killed at least 10,000 Rohingya people. At least 392 Rohingya villages in Rakhine state were reported as burned down and destroyed, as well as the looting of many Rohingya houses, and widespread gang rapes and other forms of sexual violence against the Rohingya Muslim women and girls. The military drive also displaced a large number of Rohingya people and made them refugees. According to the United Nations reports, as of September 2018, over 700,000 Rohingya people had either fled or were driven out of Rakhine state and then, they took shelter as refugees in neighboring Bangladesh. In December 2017, two Reuters journalists who had been covering the Inn Din massacre event were arrested and imprisoned.

The 2017 persecution of the Rohingya Muslims and non-Muslims has been classified as an act of ethnic cleansing and genocide by various United Nations agencies, International Criminal Court officials, human rights groups, and governments. British prime minister Theresa May and United States Secretary of State Rex Tillerson called it "ethnic cleansing" while the French President Emmanuel Macron described the situation as "genocide". The United Nations described the persecution as "a textbook example of ethnic cleansing". In late September that year, a seven-member panel of the Permanent Peoples' Tribunal found the Myanmar military and the Myanmar authority guilty of the crime of genocide against the Rohingya and the Kachin minority groups. The Myanmar leader and State Counsellor Aung San Suu Kyi was again criticised for her silence on the issue and her support of the military's actions. Subsequently, in November 2017, the governments of Bangladesh and Myanmar signed a deal to facilitate the return of Rohingya refugees to their native Rakhine state within two months, drawing a mixed response from international onlookers.

In August 2018, the office of the United Nations High Commissioner for Human Rights, reporting the findings of its investigation into the August–September 2017 events, declared that the Myanmar military—the Tatmadaw, and several of its commanders (including Commander-in-chief Senior General Min Aung Hlaing)—should face charges in the International Criminal Court for "crimes against humanity", including acts of "ethnic cleansing" and "genocide", particularly for the August–September 2017 attacks on the Rohingya.

On 19 November 2026, the ICJ found that Myanmar had committed genocide against the Rohingya, marking the first time a state has ever been found guilty by an international court of committing genocide. In the ruling, ICJ President Yuji Iwasawa declared that Myanmar had failed to prevent and punish genocide, detailing how the military had perpetrated "extreme violence" against Rohingya communities in Rakhine State. UN Secretary-General António Guterres welcomed the judgment as a "powerful recognition of the Rohingya victims of genocide," stating that it reaffirmed that impunity for such acts must not stand.

== 2016-Present: Ambazonia ==
Widespread targeted violence, government crackdowns, domicide, rape, and forced disappearances have been perpetrated against Southern Cameroon's Anglophone population by the Cameroonian government in response to 2016 protests against "francization" and subsequent separatism. The brutality has been described as genocide by activists and international commentators.

The Cameroonian government has been accused by International Lawyer Chief Charles Achaleke Taku of crimes against humanity, genocide, use of military tribunals to prosecute civilians, and the usage of concentration camps, military, and paramilitary institutions against Southern/Anglophone Cameroonians. Genocide Watch similarly contends that the systemic targeted violence by the Cameroonian government amounts to extermination.

== 2019–2023: Brazil ==
The Yanomami humanitarian crisis that took place from 2019 to 2023 under the presidency of Jair Bolsonaro in Brazil, in which several human rights violations were committed against the Yanomami people including mass deaths, famine and forced displacements, has been argued to constitute genocide by several officials and organisations, such as Brazil's Justice Minister Flávio Dino. In 2019, Bolsonaro was sued by the Arns Commission and the Human Rights Advocacy collective of the International Criminal Court for "inciting genocide and promoting systemic attacks against indigenous peoples of Brazil".

In August 2021, APIB, a coalition of Brazilian indigenous organizations, filed a request with the ICC to investigate Bolsonaro for allegedly committing genocide, ecocide and crimes against humanity against the nation's indigenous peoples, including the Yanomami. It was argued by the coalition's lawyers that Bolsonaro had committed crimes against humanity by incentivizing miners and loggers to illegally invade indigenous areas, in addition to propagating the spread of COVID-19 in their communities.

In January 2023, 5 civil organizations denounced Bolsonaro for genocide at the ICC, requesting an investigation for failing to provide protection for the indigenous group. The same month, Brazilian Supreme Federal Court Justice Luís Roberto Barroso ordered an investigation into whether high-ranking officials in the Bolsonaro administration had committed genocide, disobedience, breach of judicial secrecy, and environmental offenses against the Yanomami people and other tribes.

As of October 2026, investigations by Brazil's Federal Police and Federal Public Prosecutor's Office into allegations of genocide against the Yanomami remained ongoing, with no conclusion announced.

== 2020–2022: Ethiopia ==
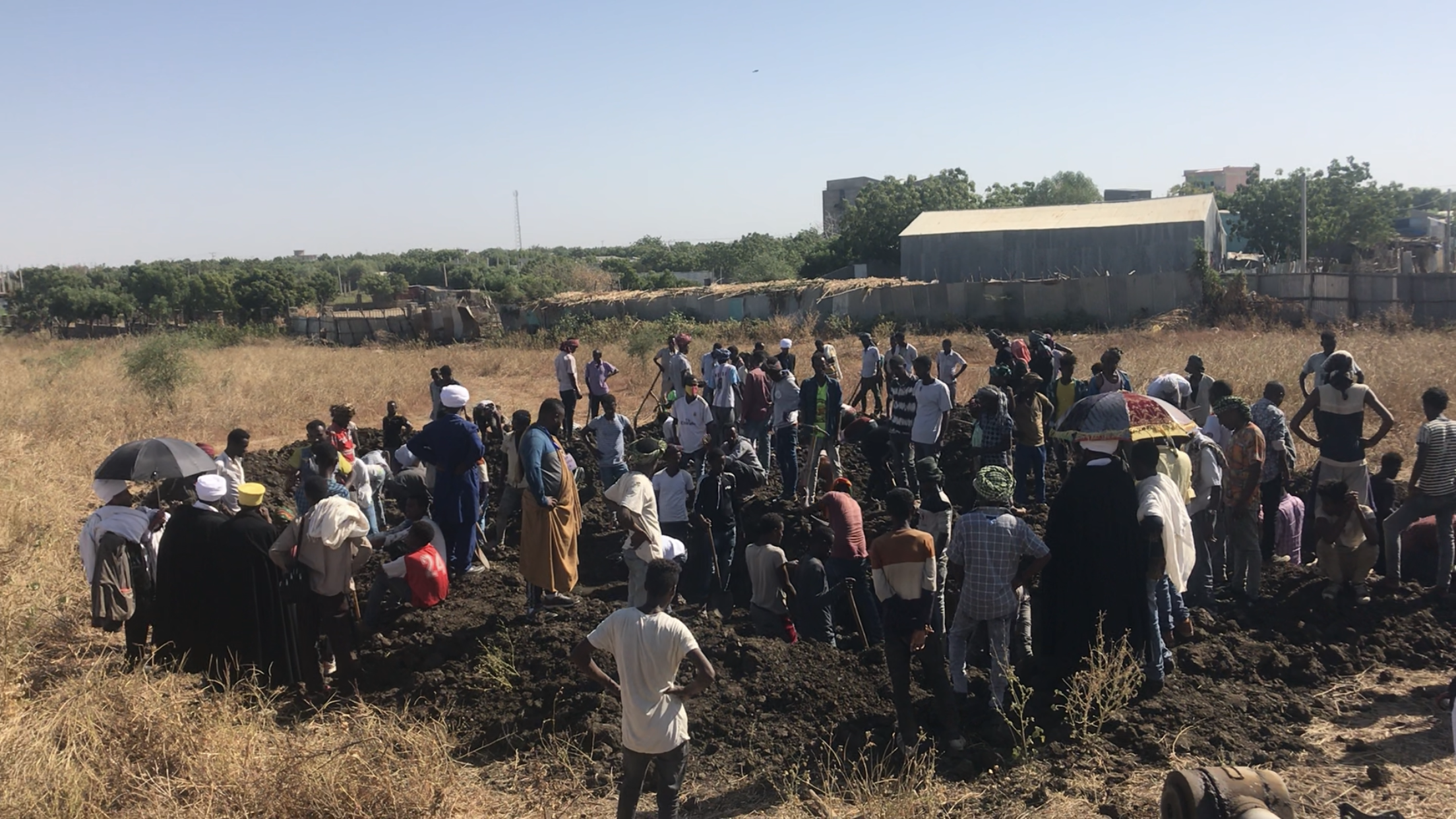
Funeral of the Amhara people mass murdered in Mai Kadra by Tigray forces

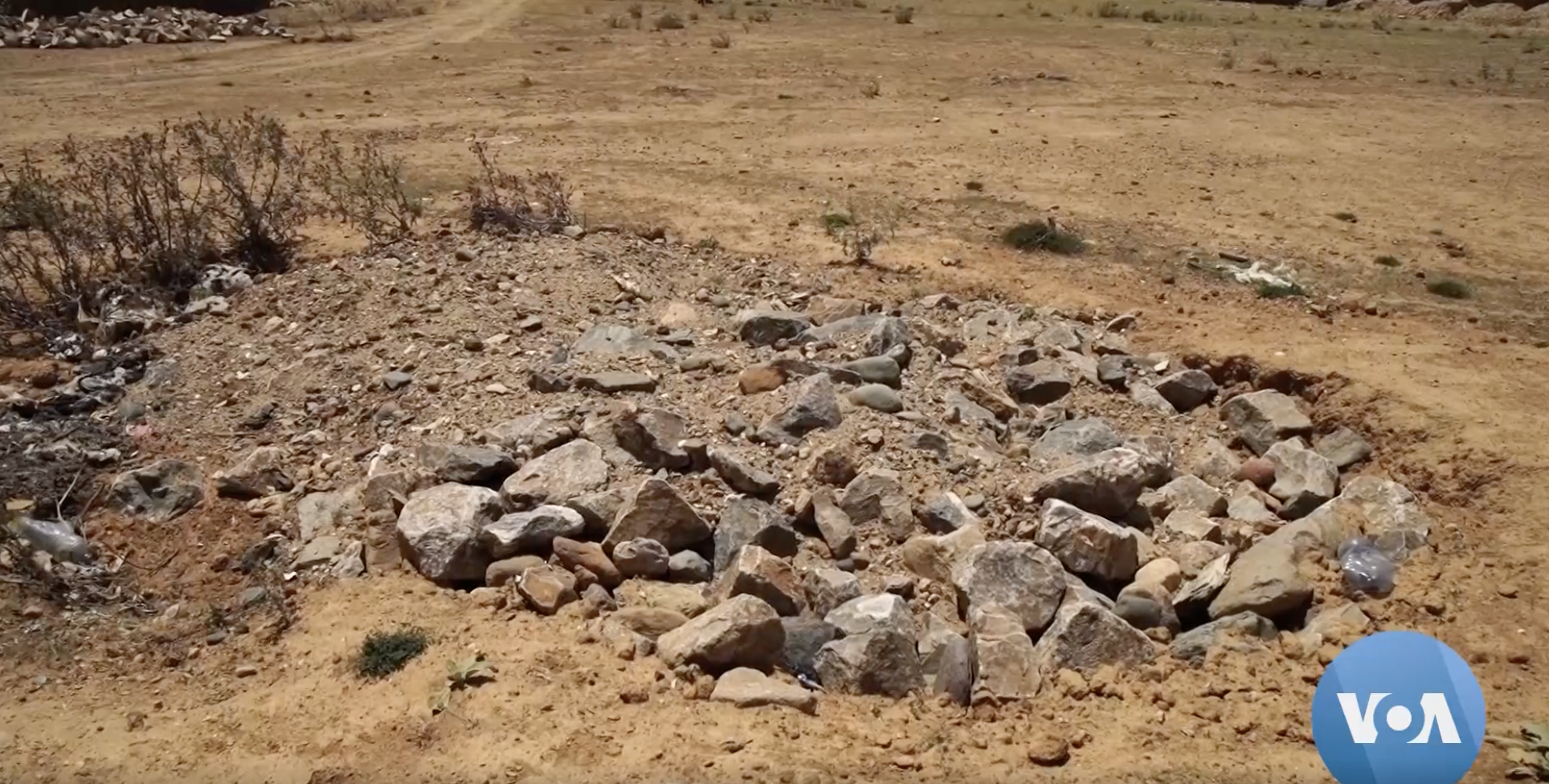
A mass grave of civilians in Tigray

The Ethiopian and Eritrean governments have repeatedly been accused of committing a genocide in the Tigray Region.

In November 2020, Genocide Watch upgraded its alert status for Ethiopia as a whole to the ninth stage of genocide, extermination, referring to the Gawa Qanqa massacre, casualties of the Tigray War, 2020 Ethiopia bus attack and the Metekel massacre and listing affected groups as the Amhara, Tigrayans, Oromo, Gedeo, Gumuz, Agaw and Qemant. Peace researcher and founder of the Institute for Peace and Security Studies, Mulugeta Gebrehiwot, stated on 27 January 2021 that the killings of Tigrayans by the Ethiopian National Defense Force (ENDF) and Eritrean Defence Forces (EDF) were "literally genocide by decree. Wherever they're moving, whomever they find, they kill him or her, [whether it's] an old man, a child, a nursing women, or anything." On 20 November 2021, Genocide Watch again issued a Genocide Emergency Alert for Ethiopia, stating that "both sides are committing genocide", and that "Prime Minister Abiy Ahmed's hate speech and calls for war" together with attacks by the ENDF and TPLF put Ethiopia into stages 4 (dehumanisation), 6 (polarisation), 8 (persecution), and 9 (extermination) of the ten stages of genocide.

On 21 November, Nigerian human rights activist and lawyer Chidi Odinkalu, called for genocide prevention, stating, "We need to focus on an urgent programme of Genocide Prevention advocacy on Ethiopia NOW. It may be too late in 2 weeks, guys." On 26 November, a group of 34 non-governmental organisations and 31 individuals, calling themselves African Citizens, British politicians Helen Clark and David Alton, and South African priest Michael Lapsley, called for the predicted genocide to be prevented.

As of late 2022, the combined impact of wartime violence, famine and a lack of medical access had killed an estimated 385,000–600,000 people, with other reported estimates reaching numbers as high as 700,000–800,000 killed.

== 2022–present: Ukraine ==
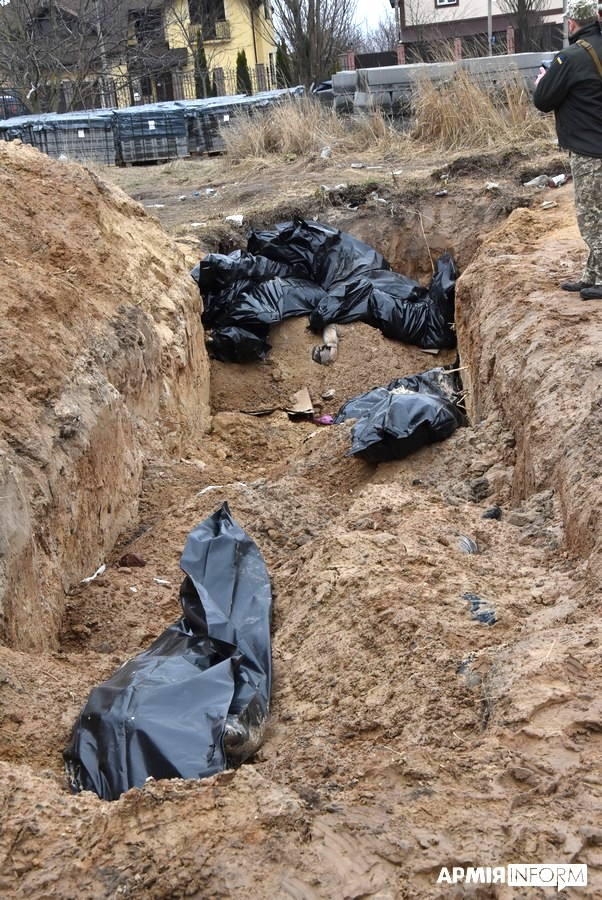
A Ukrainian mass grave in Bucha after the Russian Army committed a massacre in 2022

On 24 February 2022, Russian leader Vladimir Putin ordered the Russian invasion of Ukraine. Following months of massive war crimes against Ukrainians, several scholars assumed that a genocide was being committed in Ukraine. The Siege of Mariupol, the Bucha massacre, and the deportation of Ukrainian children to Russia so they could be forcibly adopted by Russian families were all classified as genocidal acts, while the words of Putin's officials, such as "There is no Ukraine", have been cited as examples of genocidal intent. Historian Alexander Etkind wrote that the genocidal aspects of Russian war crimes in Ukraine did not just include mass murder and deportation, they also included the intentional destruction of Ukrainian cultural sites, and he also wrote that Putin framed his genocide as the "victim's revenge" for the previous one. Political scientist Scott Straus declared that "genocide may be an appropriate term to describe the violence" following the Russian invasion of Ukraine.

Russian social media users and state media pundits demonised Ukrainians, describing them as "vermin", "rats", "unpeople", "diseased", and they also wrote that Ukraine itself must be "erased". On 6 April 2022, an op-ed article which was written by Timofey Sergeytsev, What Russia Should Do with Ukraine, was published by the Russian state-owned news agency RIA Novosti. It called for the full destruction of Ukraine as a state and the full destruction of the Ukrainian people's national identity. American historian Timothy D. Snyder cited it as an example to illustrate Russia's genocidal intent.

National parliaments, including those of Poland, Ukraine, Canada, Estonia, Latvia, Lithuania and the Republic of Ireland declared that a genocide was taking place in Ukraine. On 27 May 2022, a report by the New Lines Institute for Strategy and Policy and the Raoul Wallenberg Centre for Human Rights concluded that there were reasonable grounds to infer that Russia breached two articles of the 1948 Genocide Convention, by publicly inciting genocide through its denial of Ukraine's right to exist as a state and its denial of the Ukrainian people's right to exist as a nation, as well as through its forcible transfer of Ukrainian children to Russia, which is a genocidal act under article II of the convention. A Foreign Policy article acknowledged that Putin's goal was to "erase Ukraine as a political and national entity and Russify its inhabitants", warning that Russia's war could become a genocide.

== 2023–present: Sudan ==
During the ongoing Sudanese civil war, many civilians have been killed in massacres that have been described as ethnic cleansing or genocide. In October 2023, Genocide Watch issued an alert concerning the situation in Sudan, explicitly characterizing the massacres performed by the RSF against the Masalit people as genocide. This characterization was also shared by US academic Eric Reeves, specialized in Sudan's human rights record. In January 2025, the US government condemned the atrocities, which Secretary of State Antony Blinken described as genocide, and imposed sanctions against RSF leader Mohamed Hamdan Dagalo for his alleged role in the campaign. Sudan accused the UAE of enabling the RSF's attacks on Masalit communities by providing them with political, military and financial support, and asked the International Court of Justice to halt the UAE's supply of arms to the militia. In 2025, the RSF perpetrated a genocidal massacre in the city of El Fasher, estimated to have killed over 60,000 individuals.

== 2023: Nagorno-Karabakh ==
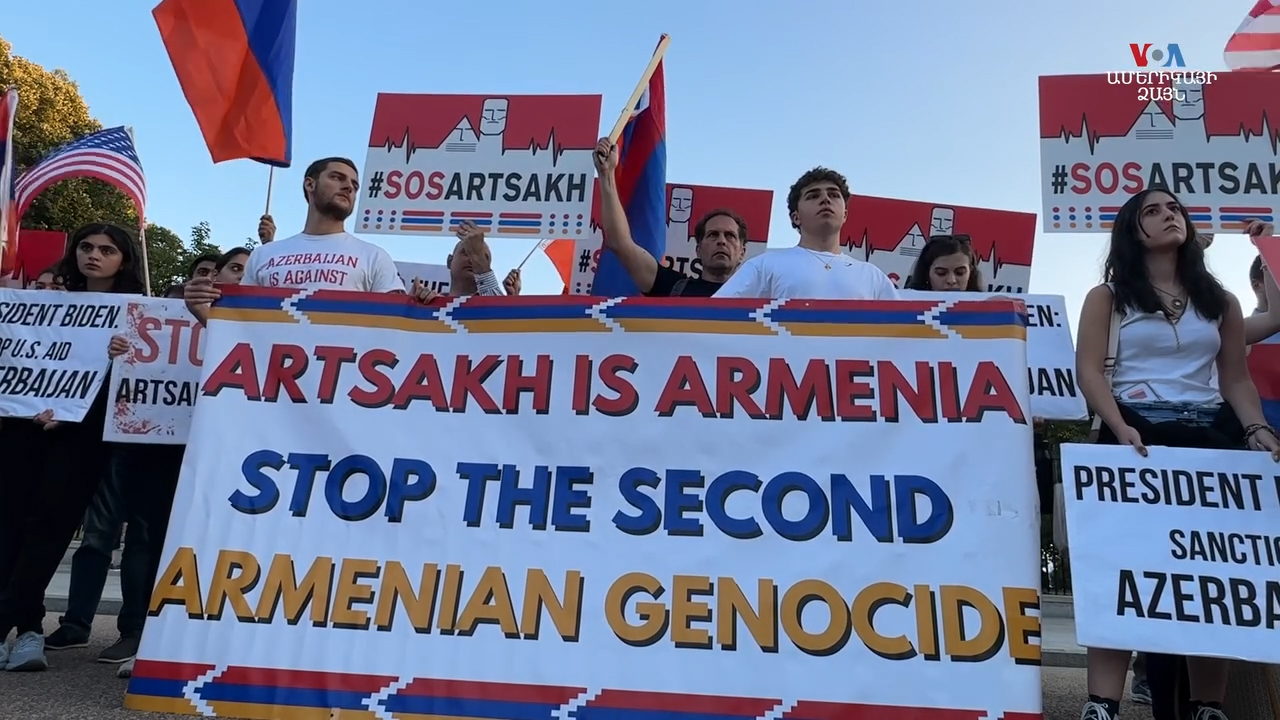
Armenians in Washington held a protest in front of the White House due to Azerbaijan's attack on Artsakh in September 2023

In September 2023, human rights organisations and experts in genocide prevention issued alerts stating that the indigenous Armenian population in Nagorno-Karabakh was at risk of genocide, while others stated that Azerbaijan was already carrying out such actions.

The Lemkin Institute for Genocide Prevention states "There is no doubt in the minds of experts in genocide prevention – at the Lemkin Institute, but also at Genocide Watch, the International Association of Genocide Scholars, and among legal experts such as former ICC chief prosecutor Luis Moreno Ocampo – that what Armenians are facing from Azerbaijan is genocide." Experts in genocide prevention have stated that Azerbaijan's ongoing blockade of Artsakh and sabotage of public infrastructure constitutes genocide according to the Genocide Convention: "Deliberately inflicting on the group conditions of life calculated to bring about its physical destruction" and that there are various indicators that Azerbaijan possesses genocidal intent: President Aliyev's public statements, his regime's openly Armenophobic practices and noncompliance with the International Court of Justice orders to end the blockade.

Historian Elyse Semerdjian highlights similarities between Azerbaijan's attack on Nagorno-Karabakh and Israel's attack on Gaza, saying that both employ tools of "genocidal warfare", namely aerial bombardment and starvation.

== 2023: Israel ==
Hamas and other Palestinian militant groups committed numerous war crimes during the October 7 attacks. According to over 100 international experts, because these acts appeared to have been carried out with an "intent to destroy, in whole or in part" a national group in line with the explicit goals of Hamas, these acts likely amounted to genocide.

== 2023–present: Gaza genocide ==
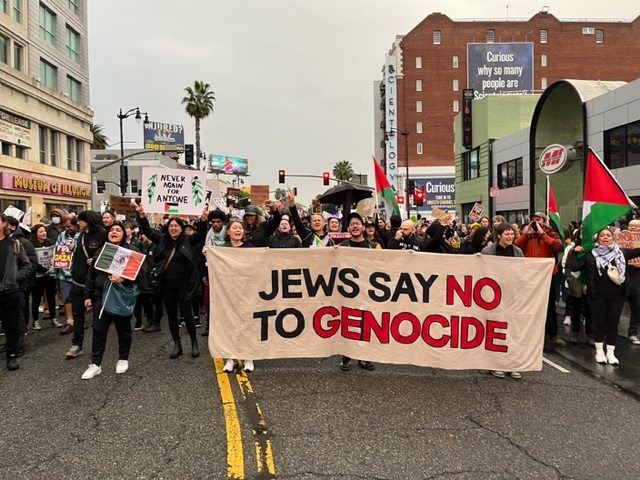
Pro-Palestinian protest in Los Angeles, 15 November 2023

Israel has been accused of inciting or carrying out genocide against the Palestinians. Proponents of this accusation have linked it to their belief that Israel is a settler colonialist state. Those who take this stance say that Israel has committed genocide in accordance with its anti-Palestinianism, Islamophobia, anti-Arab racism and the proposal to annex the West Bank. Proponents of this claim cite the Nakba, the Sabra and Shatila massacre which was perpetrated by Lebanese militants, the blockade of the Gaza Strip, the 2014 Gaza War, and the 2023 Gaza war as instances of genocidal violence. International law and genocide scholars have accused Israeli officials of using dehumanising language and using genocidal rhetoric.

Through 2024 and 2025, an increasing number of genocide scholars have concluded that Israel's actions during the Gaza war amount to genocide. In November 2024 a UN special committee concluded that Israel was conducting a genocide against Palestinians in the Gaza Strip, followed in October by a report released by Forensic Architecture that concluded "Israel's military campaign in Gaza is organised, systematic, and intended to destroy conditions of life and life-sustaining infrastructure".

In December 2024 reports were released by Amnesty International, Human Rights Watch, and Médecins Sans Frontières. Amnesty International's investigation into Gaza concluded that Israel had "committed and is continuing to commit genocide against Palestinians in the occupied Gaza Strip". The report, using evidence gathered over nine months, asserted that in multiple instances Israeli forces and government authorities had committed three of five acts prohibited under the United Nations' Genocide Convention, "namely killing, causing serious bodily or mental harm, and deliberately inflicting on Palestinians in Gaza conditions of life calculated to bring about their physical destruction" with the "specific intent to destroy Palestinians". Human Rights Watch also accused Israel of committing acts of genocide in Gaza by targeting water and sanitation infrastructure and depriving Palestinians of adequate access to water. The report alleges that Israel intentionally damaged and targeted solar panels powering treatment plants, a reservoir, and warehouses, while blocking repair materials and fuel for generators, cutting electricity supplies, and attacking workers. Médecins Sans Frontières' report said its "firsthand observations of the medical and humanitarian catastrophe inflicted on Gaza are consistent with the descriptions provided by an increasing number of legal experts and organisations concluding that genocide is taking place in Gaza."

== 2024–Present: Southern Lebanon ==
Since the beginning of the 2024 Hezbollah-Israel war, Israel has been accused of a variety of atrocities that may amount to genocide, such as domicide, intentional destruction of civilian infrastructure, displacement, war crimes through remote detonation, and encouragement of sectarianism towards Shiites.

Over 10,000 structures were demolished in the period between 2024 and 2025, much of the devastation occurring after a ceasefire agreement was instated. Visual evidence left by the Israeli military shows a trail of destruction that included homes, mosques, cemeteries, roads, parks, and football patches. Satellite imagery also shows in one village, the Star of David was carved into the ground.

Israeli military leaders have also been accused of encouraging Christian and Druze community leaders to push out Shiites already displaced by the carnage, warning that towns continuing to host them would be destroyed.

Genocide Watch has accused Israel of extermination through ecocide and domicide in Southern Lebanon. On March 27, 2026, US Congresswoman Rashida Tlaib submitted a resolution calling for solidarity with the Lebanese people and accusing Israel of ethnic cleansing and genocide. On April 15th, 2026, United Nations experts condemned Israel's actions in the Lebanon, comparing the collective punishment to ethnic cleansing and connecting the atrocities to Israel's genocide in Gaza.

== Prevention of future genocides ==
Helen Clark, Michael Lapsley and David Alton, writing in The Guardian, stated that the reasons for the Rwandan genocide and crimes such as the Bosnian genocide of the Yugoslav Wars had been analyzed in depth and they also stated that methods to prevent future genocides had been extensively discussed. They described the analyses as producing "reams of paper [that] were dedicated to analysing the past and pledging to heed warning signs and prevent genocide". African Citizens, referred to the Rwanda: The Preventable Genocide report prepared by a panel headed by former Botswana president Quett Masire for the Organisation of African Unity. (Note: The Organisation of African Unity later became the African Union.) African Citizens highlighted the sentences, "Indisputably, the most important truth that emerges from our investigation is that the Rwandan genocide could have been prevented by those in the international community who had the position and means to do so. ... The world failed Rwanda. ... [The United Nations] simply did not care enough about Rwanda to intervene appropriately." Chidi Odinkalu, former head of the National Human Rights Commission of Nigeria, was one of the African Citizens.

== See also ==
- Accusation in a mirror
- Anti-communist mass killings
- Anti-Mongolianism
- Black genocide in the United States – the notion that African Americans have been subjected to genocide throughout their history because of racism against African Americans, an aspect of racism in the United States
- Crimes against humanity
- Criticism of communist party rule
- Democide
- Ethnic cleansing
- Ethnic conflict
- Ethnic violence
- Ethnocentrism
- Ethnocide
- Far-left politics
- Far-right politics
- Far-right subcultures
- Genocide denial
- Genocide recognition politics
- Genocide of Christians by the Islamic State
- Genocide of indigenous peoples
- Genocide of Yazidis by the Islamic State
- Hate crime
- Hate group
- Hate media
- Hate speech
- Hate studies
- Iraqi Turkmen genocide
- List of ethnic cleansing campaigns
- List of genocides
- Mass killings under communist regimes
- Mass racial violence in the United States
- Native American genocide in the United States — the notion that Native Americans have been subjected to genocide because of racism against them, another aspect of racism in the United States
- Nativism (politics)
- Persecution of Shias by the Islamic State
- Political cleansing of population – an aspect of political violence
- Population transfer
- Racism
- Religious intolerance
- Religious discrimination
- Religious persecution
- Religious violence
- Sectarian violence
- Supremacism
- Terrorism
- War crime
- Xenophobia

== Sources ==
- Alecci, Scilla (14 October 2020). "British lawmakers call for sanctions over Uighur human rights abuses". International Consortium of Investigative Journalists. Archived from the original on 15 October 2020.
- 'You Feel Like You Are Subhuman': Israel's Genocide Against Palestinians In Gaza (PDF) (Report). Amnesty International. 4 December 2024. Archived (PDF) from the original on 5 December 2024.
- Bachman, Jeffrey S.; Ruiz, Esther Brito (2025). A Modern History of Forgotten Genocides and Mass Atrocities. Routledge. ISBN 978-1-003-36575-4.
- Chalk, Frank; Jonassohn, Kurt (1990). The History and Sociology of Genocide: Analyses and Case Studies. Yale University Press. ISBN 978-0-300-04446-1.
- Gangopadhyay, Partha (2016). "Economic Foundations of Religious Killings and Genocide with Special Reference to Pakistan, 1978–2012". In Anderton, Charles H.; Brauer, Jurgen (eds.). Economic Aspects of Genocides, Other Mass Atrocities, and Their Prevention. Oxford University Press. pp. 510–535. ISBN 978-0-19-937829-6.
- Gellately, Robert; Kiernan, Ben (2003). The Specter of Genocide: Mass Murder in Historical Perspective. Cambridge: Cambridge University Press. ISBN 978-0-521-52750-7.
- Gerlach, Christian (2010). Extremely Violent Societies: Mass Violence in the Twentieth-Century World. Cambridge University Press. p. 6. ISBN 978-1-139-49351-2 – via Google Books.
- Hofmann, Tessa (2024). "Wars, Genocides, Blockades". Armenological Issues. 1 (1): 96–115. doi:10.46991/ai.2024.1.27.004.
- Hollander, Paul (1 July 2012). "Perspectives on Norman Naimark's Stalin's Genocides". Journal of Cold War Studies. 14 (3): 149–189. doi:10.1162/JCWS_a_00250. S2CID 57560838.
- Kakar, Mohammed Hassan (1995). Afghanistan: The Soviet Invasion and the Afghan Response, 1979–1982. University of California Press. ISBN 978-0-5209-1914-3 – via Google Books.
- Landale, James (8 February 2021). "Uighurs: 'Credible case' China carrying out genocide". BBC News. Archived from the original on 20 July 2026.
- Lang, Berel (2005). "The Evil in Genocide". Genocide and Human Rights: A Philosophical Guide. Palgrave Macmillan UK. pp. 5–17. doi:10.1057/9780230554832_1. ISBN 978-0-230-55483-2.
- Rugira, Lonzen (20 April 2022). "Why Genocide is "the crime of crimes"". Pan African Review. Archived from the original on 13 June 2024.
- Schabas, William A. (2000). Genocide in International Law: The Crimes of Crimes (PDF) (1st ed.). Cambridge University Press. ISBN 0-521-78262-7. Archived from the original (PDF) on 16 June 2024.
- Schabas, William A. (2009). Genocide in International Law: The Crime of Crimes (2nd ed.). Cambridge: Cambridge University Press. ISBN 978-0-521-71900-1.
- Staub, Ervin (1989). The Roots of Evil: The Origins of Genocide and Other Group Violence. Cambridge, UK: Cambridge University Press. ISBN 978-0-521-42214-7.
- Straus, Scott (2022). Graziosi, Andrea; Sysyn, Frank E. (eds.). Genocide: The Power and Problems of a Concept. McGill-Queen's University Press. ISBN 978-0-2280-0951-1.
- Towner, Emil B. (2011). "Quantifying Genocide: What Are We Really Counting (On)?". JAC. 31 (3/4): 625–638. ISSN 2162-5190. JSTOR 41709663.
- Weiss-Wendt, Anton (December 2005). "Hostage of Politics: Raphael Lemkin on 'Soviet Genocide'". Journal of Genocide Research. 7 (4). Routledge: 551–559. doi:10.1080/14623520500350017. ISSN 1462-3528. S2CID 144612446.
- Williams, Dianne (2012). Race, Ethnicity, and Crime. Algora Publishing. ISBN 978-0-87586-915-5.
