= Nuer massacre =

Massacre in South Sudan

- Part of the South Sudanese Civil War, and ethnic violence in South Sudan
- Date: 15 December 2013
- Duration: 4 days (15-18)
- Location: Juba, South Sudan Key areas in Juba: Gudele, 107, New Site, Khor William, Jebel, Mangaten, Amarat and Thongpiny area
- Also known as: Juba Nuer Massacre
- Type: Massacre; mass killing; Ethnic cleansing
- Motive: Ethnic
- Perpetrators: Dinka soldiers from the SPLA; Salva Kiir; Mathiang Anyoor; Jieng Council of Elders
- Deaths: 15,000-20,000, mostly Nuer people
- Burial: Mass graves; Dumped in the White Nile; burning the corpses
- Displaced: 81,000

The Nuer massacre, which occurred from 15 to 18 December 2013, was a well-organized, intentional mass killing perpetrated against thousands of Nuer civilians by Dinka Sudan People's Liberation Army (SPLA) soldiers, Presidential Guard - Tiger Division, and Mathiang Anyoor (Dut Ku Beny), supported by Uganda People's Defence Forces (UPDF), orchestrated by the President of the Republic of South Sudan Salva Kiir, Jieng Council of Elders (JCE), and Dinka high-ranking military generals within the SPLA army in Juba. Around 20,000 thousand Nuer civilians were massacred in four days between 15 and 18 December 2013.

The Nuer massacre sparked a wave of widespread anger among the Nuer people in Jonglei, Upper Nile, and Unity State and the rise of recurrent revenge attacks against Dinka by the Nuer White Army and the defected Nuer SPLA soldiers marked the beginning of the South Sudanese civil war. This led to the expansion of UNMISS Protection of Civilians (PoC) sites across South Sudan. The civil war continued until 2018 and lead to around 400,000 excess civilian deaths. In 2017 the UK Government secretary for international development, Priti Patel stated that the ongoing fighting had a "basis for genocide". The Nuer massacre was termed as ethnic cleansing by the United Nations.

== Background ==
In January 2013, President Kiir retired 35 general officers, including all six deputies of the Chief of General Staff. In February, 100 more military generals were retired from the SPLA. By July 2013, President Kiir dismissed his entire cabinet by presidential decree including his vice president Riek Machar and Sudan People's Liberation Movement (SPLM) party secretary general Pagan Amum, shortly after Machar announced he would contest Kiir for the 2015 South Sudan general election which was then postponed in May 2014. The sackings sparked concern over potential instability in South Sudan which was still recovering from the Sudanese second civil war.

According to Clemence Pinaud, an associate professor at Indiana University Bloomington, the move was to oppose the democratic transition of power In South Sudan. The Jieng Council of Elders (JCE), which is a political council made of Dinka elders and tribal leaders, were bolstered by Kiir after the signing of the Comprehensive peace agreement (CPA) and highly influenced the political decisions in South Sudan. JCE was focused on Dinka rule which was detrimental in such ethnically divided country.

After Riek Machar announced that he would run for presidency in the 2015 general election, Pagan Amum, former Secretary General of the SPLM, and Rebecca Nyandeng De Mabior, the wife of the late John Garang De Mabior also declared their candidacy to challenge Kiir for the presidency afterward. This posed tension within the country and early attempts were made to engage mostly Kiir and Machar to avoid a potential civil war, which did not succeed. In early 2013, a committee was formed and a series of meetings were held to resolve the political tension within the SPLM party but this also came to a dead end.

Thereafter, Kiir and the Jieng Council of Elders began to secretly mobilize the Dinka militia, and the presence of Dinka security forces deployed in and around Juba was seen as an early sign of war. Kiir secretly recruited a private tribal army, dubbed the Mathiang Anyoor or Tiger battalion, outside of the normal SPLA structure and placed them under Paul Malong Awan, Governor of Northern Bahr el Ghazal state. The Tiger battalion goes by different names, such as "Dut Ku Beny," meaning rescue the President in Dinka language, or Mathiang Anyoor, meaning Brown Caterpillar. The Tiger battalion, was consired the presidential guard which consisted mostly of the Dinka. In January 2013, 70 percent of the SPLA was Nuer due to the militias like SSDF being integrated to the national army

Halfway through 2013, South Sudan's allies were profoundly concerned and focused on the country's political turmoil. The United States and the European Union advised both leaders of South Sudan's SPLM ruling party, President Kiir and former Vice President Machar, to maintain calm and prevent violence between their two largest ethnic groups.

== The massacre ==
The massacre is believed to be sparked by disagreement within the Presidential Guard, following a claim that there was an order to disarm sections of the Presidential Guard. The disarming had started but only the Nuer soldiers were disarmed which led to the start of the shootings. In the evening of 15 December 2013, with the coup successfully simulated at the Giada Military Barracks, at a pre-arranged signal, Tiger Battalion in Juba were summoned and armed. During the night of that same day, the massive killing and massacre of the Nuer on ethnic grounds engulfed Juba. The Dinka SPLA generals upon President Salva Kiir and Jieng Council of Elders' order, conducted a military operation systematically killing along the ethnic line in Juba. Prior to the shootings, the Mathiang Anyoor was secretly mobilized and relocated to Juba, the capital city of South Sudan, to conduct the massacre. Dinka Generals like Paul Malong Awan, Bol Akot and Akol Koor, were to coordinate and liaise between the Tiger battalion and the respective forces under their command in Juba. The Chief of General Staff, James Hoth Mai, and the SPLA leadership in Juba were not to know or even be remotely involved, instead, he was expressly granted leave of absence to visit family in Australia by Salva Kiir. President Kiir addressed the nation on national television on the morning of 16 December 2013, with groups of politicians and SPLA military generals. Kiir announced that a there had been a coup attempt by Riek Machar. Machar strongly denied the allegations. President Kiir also announced a curfew in Juba between 6 A.M and 6 P.M.

The Nuer massacre was carried out on a massive scale of door-to-door operation. The operational plan was quite clear and simple; Set up roadblocks all over Juba and then send out the president's private army (Dut ku Beny), backed up by elements of the Presidential Guard and the National Security Services who would guide them, on house-to-house searches and targeted killings of Nuer peoples. Thousands of Nuer were massacred in their own homes and thousands more were killed on their way to the UN sites in hope of seeking shelter under UN protection. On the morning of 16 December 2013, both UN bases around Juba opened their gates to 14,000 civilians. During the first days, thousands of civilians sought shelter at the UN Base. As the fighting continued, the number of people seeking shelter reached 20,000 as foreigners and other non-Dinka people joined afterward. In the span of 4 days starting from the evening of 15 to 18 December, though the mass killing didn't slow down until the end of 19 December, the number of Nuer people killed was between 15,000 and 20,000 thousand civilians including many women and children. The Nuer Massacre was conducted through mass killings, there were reports of mass rapes and cannibalism. In the Presidential residence, Lual Maroldit ordered the disarming of 21 Nuer soldiers within the presidential protection unit. They were rounded up and massacred together with 90 Nuer civilians from the neighborhood of the Presidential residence in Amarat. According to UNMISS report, 200 - 300 Nuer bodies were found in Juba Teaching Hospital on 17 December. By 19 December 2013, Nuer corpses were everywhere. Thousands of Nuer bodies were bundled onto military Pickup trucks, heavy trucks, and any other available ways of transport and dumped into the River Nile. Mass graves were dug up in the New Site cemetery opposite the Bilpham SPLA General Headquarters and near another military facility behind the Jebel Kujur Mountain. In other parts of the city, the bodies were simply doused in fuel and set ablaze.

The news of the killing of the Nuer in Juba by Dinka quickly spread throughout Nuerland. The Nuer White Army joined forces with the defected Nuer SPLA soldiers (who are now known as SPLA-IO) for retaliation and the conflict intensified throughout South Sudan. Eastern Jikany Nuer mostly from the Gaajiok subclan from Nasir led by General Gathoth Gatkuoth HothNyang carried out an offensive attack to capture Malakal and rescue the Nuer who were stuck in the Malakal United Nations Mission in South Sudan site and to bring them back home. General Koang Chuol Ranley rebelled in Bentiu and defeated the government troops. Simon Gatwech Dual led the Lou Nuer and captured Bor town. General Peter Gadet became the first Nuer SPLA general to rebel against Kiir's government. He fought his battles around Juba and along the Juba-Bor road on 18 December before retreating to the Greater Upper Nile. Peter Gadet fulfilled the promise he made way before the massacre happened - "Anyone who wants to kill the Nuer has to go through me first". Peter Gadet yet again promised his Nuer People after the massacre that he was coming to rescue them "My Nuer people, the world is against us, Kiir is against us, but God is on our side. I am coming".

=== Gudele massacre ===
On the night of 16 December 2013, Dinka soldiers and police patrolling the Gudele police station and the Gudele neighborhood rounded up around 200-400 Nuer civilians and forced them into a small overcrowded room inside Gudele police station. During that night, the soldiers killed them by opening fire indiscriminately on 400 people through the two windows of the suffocating overcrowded room. According to multiple survivors interviewed by the UNMISS, many of these people were arrested during the Gudele neighborhood house-to-house search and some of them were collected at checkpoint at the Gudele crossroads.

Ivan Šimonović, a Human Rights Watch official in the United Nations and a former Justice Minister of Croatia condemned the Gudele massacre and called it "horrible crimes". Simonovic in his remark to the BBC said, "President Kiir is downplaying the massacre which is being committed by his own SPLA soldiers".

== Casualties ==
In span of four days, more than 20,000 Nuer civilians were massacred between 15 and 18 December 2013, in Juba. Between December 2013 - May 2021, The New York Times estimated 400,000 people dead and the UNHCR estimated 2.24 million people displaced across South Sudan.

== Perpetrators ==
The massacre in Juba was perpetrated by ethnically Dinka security forces. Most of the attacks showed signs of organisation and planning before the massacre. The massacre wasn't perpetrated only by soldiers and cases of Dinka senior commanders stopping some killings show that the massacre was at least in some cases under direct command and control of commanders. The presidential guard, SPLA military police, engineering force and commando forces were heavily involved in the killings in Juba. Although the Minister of Defence in South Sudan stated that most of the killings were done by the presidential guard during the massacre. African Union Commission of Inquiry found that the massacre was committed "in furthenance of a State policy" and that the attacks "could not have been successful without concerted efforts from various actors in the military and government circles"

=== Uganda Involvement in the South Sudanese civil war ===
Ugandan president Yoweri Museveni is an important ally of South Sudan president Salva Kiir. On 19 December 2013, shortly after the outbreak of the Nuer massacre, the Government of Uganda deployed two battalions of the Uganda People's Defence Force (UPDF) into South Sudan

Within days of the outbreak of the Nuer massacre in mid-December, Museveni announced that the deployment of the Uganda People's Defence Force (UPDF) deployed to South Sudan was at Kiir's invitation to help in evacuating over 200,000 stranded Ugandan nationals and to secure strategic installations in Juba. However, several weeks into the operation, President Yoweri Museveni disclosed that the UPDF was also involved in combat operations alongside Kiir's government forces, a move that drew a lot of criticism from the international community. The UPDF's two battalions, helicopter gunships, heavy artillery, and tanks were instrumental in helping SPLA soldiers retake cities held by Nuer forces affiliated with former Vice President Riek Machar.

Around the week of 7 February 2014, there was a report from United Nations de-mining workers about the use of cluster bombs by UPDF and SPLA against the Nuer fighters after the remnants of this type of weapons were found on Juba-Bor road 16 kilometers south of Bor where the fighting was intense. It was not known if the cluster bombs were dropped from the air or launched on the ground as the bomb split open and scattered bomblets over a vast area before its impact. UN Secretary-General Ban Ki-Moon released a statement condemning the use of the banned weapon in South Sudan. Human Rights Watch urged both President Kiir and President Museveni to investigate the reported use of cluster bombs and the persons responsible. The investigation was never carried out and South Sudan's defense minister,Kuol Manyang Juuk and The Ugandan army's chief of defense, Katumba Wamala, strongly denied that any cluster munitions have been used in the conflict. The experts found cluster bombs remnants of up to eight RBK-250-275 and numerous quantities of AO-1SCh bomblets which they believed were dropped from the air by either a helicopter or fixed aircraft.

After previously denying their involvement in the South Sudan conflict, UPDF Spokesman Paddy Ankunda admitted to Al Jazeera on 16 January 2014, that their forces were fighting alongside The SPLA troops against the Nuer fighters in Bor. The presence of Ugandan troops and their involvement in the conflict between Kiir's Dinka troops and Machar's Nuer white army sparked major diplomatic unrest. IGAD "Intergovernmental Authority on Development" condemned Ugandan troops' involvement and deemed it as "unbenevolent act" and "not helping" in their quest to bring peace and stability to South Sudan. Børge Brende Norwegian Foreign Minister urged President Museveni to start withdrawing his troops from Juba, Bor, and the surrounding areas. Rabie Abdelati, one of the top members of NCP stated that "South Sudan does not need Uganda's military help to solve its internal problems". Ethiopia strongly condemns Uganda's military operation in South Sudan.

Despite IGAD, Sudan, Ethiopia, and the international community urging Uganda to withdraw from South Sudan, the withdrawal didn't happen until October 2015, when Ugandan President Museveni started to withdraw his troops from South Sudan for the first time in two years and a half since their deployment on 30 December 2013. UPDF withdrawal came as a part of a peace agreement that was signed in August 2015 between President Kiir and his ex-vice President Machar to end the war and bring peace to South Sudan.

== Aftermath ==
=== Reaction ===
The Nuer massacre was termed as ethnic cleansing by several organisation including the United Nations. Priti Patel, UK secretary of state, branded this kind of targeted mass killings based on ethnic line had "a basis for genocide".

Speaking to tens of thousands of people from the central balcony of St. Peter's Basilica in his first "Urbi et Orbi" message themed around peace, which he dedicated to countries plagued by conflict, Pope Francis called for "social harmony in South Sudan, where current tensions have already caused numerous victims and are threatening peaceful coexistence in that young state".

Hilde Frafjord Johnson, the Special Representative of the Secretary-General and head of the United Nations Mission in South Sudan, issued a statement shortly after the fighting erupted in Juba that "the UNMISS was deeply concerned about the fighting" and "urged all parties to cease hostility". As part of their seven-month investigation into the South Sudan conflict, the UN Commission on Human Rights described the incident as "teetering on the edge of genocide and experiencing ethnic cleansing, a stark portrayal of a nation that is now deep into civil war". According to U.N. officials, "perpetrators of these human rights violations should be held accountable; otherwise, the viability of South Sudan as a new nation-state will be jeopardized".

Following two weeks of intense fighting, the Intergovernmental Authority on Development (IGAD) issued a four-day ultimatum to the warring factions in South Sudan to stop fighting, threatening to "take action" to end hostilities if the parties failed to cease their hostilities. "They would not accept a violent overthrow of the country's democratically elected government, and stated that any change had to occur through the democratic process," the leaders of the IGAD warned in their joint statement.

The United States Embassy in South Sudan released a statement that it had received "reports from multiple reliable sources of ongoing security incidents and sporadic gunfire in multiple locations" across Juba and the embassy recommends that "all U.S. citizens should exercise extra caution at all times. The Embassy will continue to monitor the security environment in South Sudan closely, with particular attention to Juba City and its surrounding areas." On 17 December 2013, the embassy tweeted on its official Twitter account that all of its citizens in the country should "depart immediately". Following an attack on three US aircraft attempting to evacuate American nationals from South Sudan, President Obama wrote to top US congressional leaders, stating that he may take "further action" to safeguard American citizens and interests.

On 19 December 2013, the British government announced that as the violence worsened, it would deploy an airplane to remove its citizens from Juba. The decision to temporarily remove certain employees and dependents from the British Embassy in South Sudan was made by the Foreign and Commonwealth Office, which has issued a travel advisory for Juba and other areas of the country.

=== Impact ===
In 2019, a scientific research conducted by the Swedish University on grassroots-level dehumanization in the South Sudan conflict between the two largest ethnic groups, the Dinka and the Nuer suggests that there was a dehumanization attitude involved in the conflict, citing the 15 December 2013, Nuer massacre in Juba as the main source. The outcome of the study demonstrated mechanistic dehumanization by the Dinka participants toward the Nuer, but no such kind of dehumanization was found among the Nuer toward the Dinka, although there were clear signs of intergroup bias in the conflict.

In 2024, another scientific study on refugees in Uganda revealed that Nuer are being targeted more than other ethnic Groups. Specifically, 45.7% of Nuer respondents reported knowing someone who was killed en route to Uganda, compared to 9.2% of Dinka. Additionally, 33.7% of Nuer experienced injuries, versus 9% of Dinka. Furthermore, 70.2% of Nuer saw soldiers, while only 34.6% of Dinka did. This indicates that Nuer individuals faced more frequent exposure to violence during their journey, further highlighting the lingering impact of 15 December massacre on the Nuer population in the region.
