= Operation Sankat Mochan (India) =

- Part of South Sudanese Civil War
- Operational scope: Humanitarian relief
- Type: Emergency evacuation
- Planned by: Indian Armed Forces and Ministry of External Affairs
- Commanded by: General V K Singh
- Objective: Evacuation of Indian citizens from South Sudan
- Date: 14 July 2016 – 16 July 2016
- Executed by: Indian Air Force

Operation Sankat Mochan (Hindi: संकट मोचन lit. "crisis redemption") was an operation of the Indian Air Force to evacuate Indian citizens and other foreign nationals from South Sudan during the South Sudanese Civil War. The operation was carried out in view of the 2016 Juba clashes.

== Background ==
There were around 600 Indians in South Sudan; around 450 in Juba and others elsewhere in the country.

== Operation ==
Two C-17 Globemasters of the Indian Air Force were deployed to evacuate. The first flight left Juba on 15 July (South Sudan Time) carrying 143 individuals including 10 women and 3 infants. After a stop at Entebbe, Uganda for technical reasons it resumed its flight to India, landing in Thiruvananthapuram, Kerala on 16 July. The second flight returned with 154 passengers.
