= Battle of Juba (2016) =

Clashes during the South Sudanese Civil War

Coordinates: 4.8500°N 31.6000°E

- Part of the South Sudanese Civil War
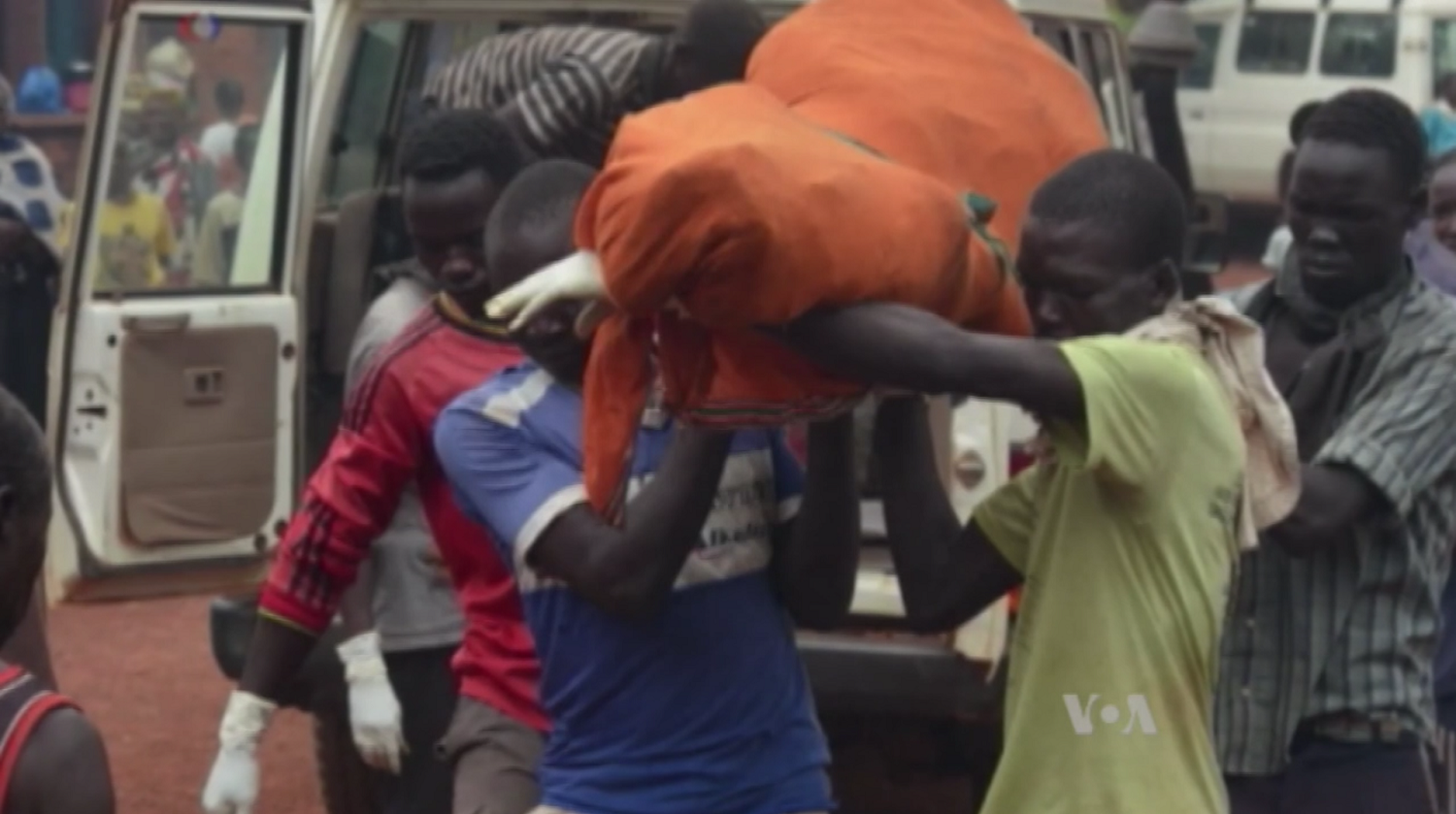
- A civilian casualty of the battle is carried to a makeshift grave.
Date	7–11 July 2016
Location	Juba, South Sudan
Result	Kiir-loyalist victory: Ceasefire declared in Juba on 11 July 2016; Civil war fully resumed

Belligerents
Soldiers loyal to Salva Kiir	Soldiers loyal to Riek Machar (SPLM-IO)

Commanders and leaders
Salva Kiir; Paul Malong Awan	Unclear

Units involved
Presidential Guard (Tiger Battalion); Mathiang Anyoor; South Sudan Air Force	Machar's bodyguards

Strength
Unknown	1,400+

Casualties and losses
- 300+ killed (including 2 Chinese U.N. peacekeepers)

The Battle of Juba of 2016 was a series of clashes in South Sudan capital of Juba between rival factions of the Sudan People's Liberation Army (SPLA) loyal to President Salva Kiir and Vice-President Riek Machar respectively.

== Background ==
In August 2015, both sides signed a peace agreement to end the South Sudanese Civil War. Machar was later reappointed as Vice-President in April 2016. At least 1,400 soldiers loyal to Machar moved into Juba before he returned, setting up a camp near the barracks of Kiir-loyal troops. Both sides were deeply suspicious of each other. On 3 July, a soldier loyal to Machar, Lieutenant Colonel George Gismala was killed by government security personnel. The killing led to a rise in tensions within some security forces in Juba.

== Battle ==
The fighting started with an incident on 7 July, as soldiers loyal to Machar were stopped at a checkpoint in Juba's Gudele district. Violence erupted, reportedly initiated by government soldiers. The incident left five Kiir-loyalist soldiers dead and two soldiers of unspecified affiliation injured. In the following night, government troops attacked armored cars belonging to United States diplomats, though nobody was hurt.

On 8 July, Kiir and Machar met in the presidential palace for a press conference, attempting to defuse the situation. As the two talked to journalists, Machar's bodyguards parked their cars next to those of Kiir's Presidential Guard (known as "Tiger Battalion"). After a short time, both sides started shooting at each other. It remained unclear who started the firefight; both sides would later blame each other. In any case, both Machar and Kiir loyalists were eager for a fight. Chaos erupted, and Kiir personally saved Machar from death. As the fighting temporarily abated, the President brought his rival to a car, shielding him with his own body and ensuring that he could escape. Journalist Peter Martell argued that this action was probably not motivated by any sympathy of Kiir for Machar, but the former's belief that it would reflect badly on him if his rival were to be killed at the presidential palace.

The clashes subsequently spread across the city. The army barracks erupted in violence. Shooting occurred outside a UN base, where one death was reported. Government loyalist forces poured into Juba, eventually securing most of it. Fighting on 8 July left 35 SPLM-IO soldiers and 80 government soldiers dead.

I have been a soldier since I was a child. I never experienced a battle like that. It was soldier on soldier, and then soldier on civilian. The dead lined the streets.

— Richard Bida, SPLA lieutenant

The next day was mostly calm, but Kiir ordered his troops to finally hunt down and kill Machar on 10 July. The fighting was concentrated in Jebel and Gudele, where rebel bases were located, as well as in a UN base. Loud explosions and gunfire were also heard near the airport. The government troops used tanks to break through the defenses of Machar's personal compound, forcing him to flee on foot. South Sudan Air Force fighter jets and attack helicopters indiscriminately attacked rebel forces, unconcerned about civilian casualties. In Jebel, rebel camps were bombed by government helicopters. Two Chinese peacekeepers were killed and eight others were wounded, when their armoured personnel carrier was hit by a bomb inside the UN base. The government soldiers also attacked civilians based on ethnicity, resulting in thousands fleeing for their lives. The fighting initially ended when a thunderstorm began. At least 272 people, including 33 civilians, were killed during the fighting on 8 July.

The battle resumed on 11 July, and Gudele and Jebel remained hotspots of violence. Explosions hit Tomping, where the airport, embassies, and a U.N. base were located. Mortars were heard in the downtown area. Eight people in a UN refugee camp were killed and 67 injured by gunfire. A ceasefire was announced; however, reports of gunfire continued. By the morning of 12 July, it appeared that the ceasefire was holding. Regardless, government troops including Mathiang Anyoor militiamen, continued to loot the city.

Approximately 50 to 100 soldiers looted the Terrain Hotel, where they murdered journalist John Gatluak and raped five women. Ten soldiers were sentenced to jail for the crimes in August 2018.

Even days after the battle had ended, soldiers were stopping women venturing out of civilian camps to steal from and rape them. Human Rights Watch commented that had UN peacekeepers patrolled "key areas", fewer rapes would have occurred. On 4 August, OHCHR stated that there had been more than 200 reported cases of sexual assault in Juba. The HRW also noted that the United Nations Mission in South Sudan (UNMISS) peacekeepers at Thongpiny base took more than six hours to let fleeing civilians in. During and after the battle, government forces blocked fleeing civilians, and a journalist who had written a critical editorial on the clashes was detained.

== Aftermath ==
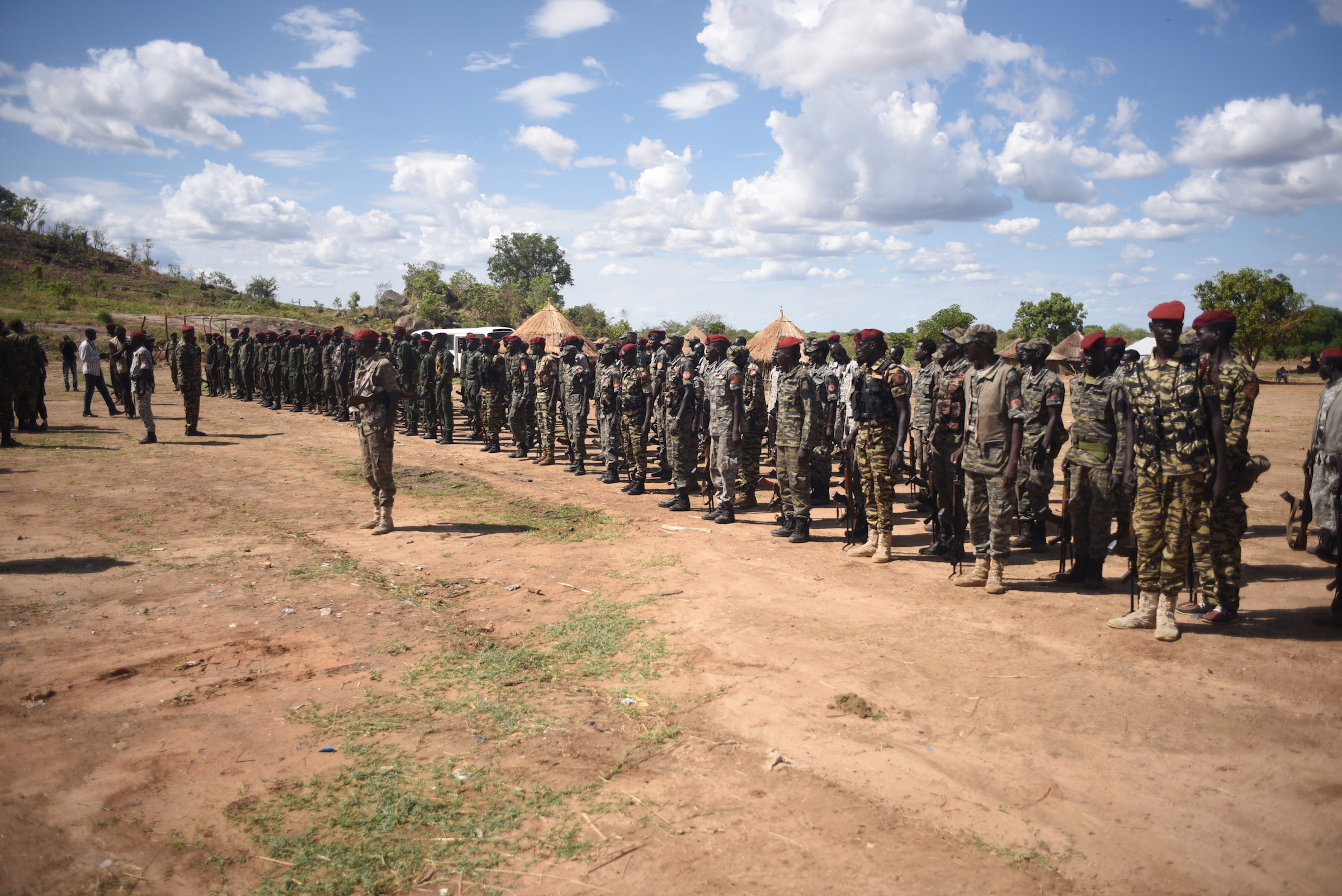
SPLA soldiers near Juba, shortly after the clashes in the city.

Overall at least 300 people were killed in the fighting, including at least 33 civilians and two Chinese UN peacekeepers. Eleven Ugandans were also among the dead. Approximately 36,000 civilians fled parts of the city due to the clashes. Many stores had been looted during the conflict.

There were around 600 Indians in South Sudan; around 450 in Juba and others elsewhere in the country at the time of the conflict. Two C-17 Globemasters of the Indian Air Force were deployed to evacuate Indians and other foreign nationals. The first flight left Juba on 15 July (South Sudan Time), carrying 143 individuals including ten women and three infants. It landed in Kerala on 16 July. The operation was codenamed Operation Sankat Mochan (lit. Saviour).

On 12 August, the UN Security Council authorized a new Regional Protection Force mandated to protect Juba Airport as well as other installations as a part of UNMISS.

With the collapse of the peace deal, the civil war fully resumed and further escalated in violence.

== Reactions ==
Both Kiir and Machar have condemned the clashes, and repeatedly called for their forces to stop fighting.

UN Secretary-General Ban Ki-moon stated:

I am shocked and appalled by the heavy fighting that is currently taking place in Juba. I strongly urge President Kiir and First Vice-President Riek Machar to do everything within their power to de-escalate the hostilities immediately and to order their respective forces to disengage and withdraw to their bases. This senseless violence is unacceptable and has the potential of reversing the progress made so far in the peace process...

The United Nations Security Council, after an emergency meeting on the crisis, issued a statement calling for an immediate cessation to the fighting and for both Kiir and Machar to do their utmost to control their respective forces. The United Nations Mission in South Sudan has increased patrols near its base.

=== National reactions ===
Sudan condemned the conflict, and Sudanese President Omar al-Bashir urged Kiir and Machar in telephone calls to use self-restraint.

The United States condemned the violence and called for the parties to "immediately restrain their forces from further fighting, return them to barracks, and prevent additional violence and bloodshed."
