= Jieng Council of Elders =

Dinka elders politician council (started 2011)

Following South Sudan's independence, 45 prominent Jieng (Dinka) politicians and elders formed the Jieng Council of Elders, which is chaired by a former Chief Justice of the Supreme Court Ambrose Riiny Thiik. The JCE is a tribal advisory committee to South Sudan President Salva Kiir, and it has been accused by Justice Deng Biong of advising Kiir on "divisive ethnic policies". The JCE is often accused of being behind hardline Sudan People's Liberation Movement/Army (SPLM/A) policies, and radicalisation of young Dinka.

The King of the Shilluk Kingdom, Reth Kwongo Dak Padiet, claimed his people were at risk of physical and cultural extinction. He claimed the SPLM/A razed down several villages and that his lawyers were preparing a case before the International Criminal Court against senior SPLA staff and members of the JCE.

The JCE opposed the Intergovernmental Authority on Development's (IGAD) 2015 peace agreement that was supposed to end the South Sudanese Civil War between Kiir (Dinka) and Riek Machar (Sudan People's Liberation Movement-in-Opposition which advocates for Nuer people’s interests), and demilitarise Juba. In addition, the JCE advised Kiir to undermine the agreement. Also, the JCE has misrepresented the United Nations' work and intentions, leading to incidents where attacks on UN personnel occurred.

== See also ==
- Nuer massacre – Massacre in South Sudan
- Bona Malwal – South Sudanese journalist and politician
