= Mathiang Anyoor =

South Sudanese militia group

- Leaders: Salva Kiir; Paul Malong Awan (formerly)
- Dates active: 2012–present
- Ideology: Dinka tribalism Anti-Nuer sentiment

Mathiang Anyoor, also spelled Mathiang Anyur (meaning "Brown caterpillar"), also known as Dot Ke Beny (meaning "Rescue the President"), is a Dinka-affiliated militia group in South Sudan. Originally an ad-hoc volunteer force founded in 2012, the militia was transformed into a private army to protect President Salva Kiir and army chief Paul Malong Awan. However, the South Sudanese military (SPLA) claims that it is just another battalion. Much of the ethnic violence against non-Dinkas in the South Sudanese Civil War is attributed to the militia.

== History ==
Mathiang Anyoor was organized as an all-volunteer militia by President Kiir in response to the Heglig Crisis of 2012, as South Sudan and Sudan battled for the oil-rich area around Heglig. Mostly recruited from Bahr al Ghazal natives, it was supposed to aid the SPLA during this crisis. When the fighting for Heglig ended, however, Mathiang Anyoor was not disbanded. Instead, it transformed into a private army loyal to the president and his inner circle. As the conflict between the President and Vice President Riek Machar grew in intensity during 2013, the mobilization and training of Mathiang Anyoor fighters was accelerated. By this point, the militia already counted thousands of fighters. On 9 December 2013, the Presidential Guard and Mathiang Anyoor allegedly undertook a reconnaissance mission in the capital, Juba, possibly to identify Nuer population centers in the city. Six days later, the civil war between Kiir and Machar erupted. Mathiang Anyoor promptly responded by attacking Machar's forces, but also started anti-Nuer pogroms during which more than 200 people were killed in Juba. Much of the ethnic violence against Equatorians around Yei after the second Juba clashes in 2016 are attributed to Mathiang Anyoor. In April 2017, Mathiang Anoor forces led by General Thayip Gatluak attacked Wau, targeting Jur and Fertit people, killing at least 18 people.

Following Paul Malong Awan's fall from power in 2017, Mathiang Anyoor units reportedly withdrew from the frontlines against the rebels in protest, most notably in the Upper Nile region. While the new army chief James Ajonga Mawut subsequently managed to convince several groups of the militia to rejoin combat against the rebels, elements of Mathiang Anyoor relocated to Aweil on Malong's orders. Observers speculated that these militia forces in Aweil later joined a new rebel force, the South Sudan Patriotic Army.

Mathiang Anoor members are known to have illegally bought weapons from the Ethiopian Unity Patriots Front, a former Ethiopian rebel group with links to Kiir's government.
