= Təklə =

Təklə or Teklya or Tegle or Taklya may refer to:

- Təklə Mirzəbaba, Azerbaijan
- Təklə, Agsu, Azerbaijan
- Təklə, Gobustan, Azerbaijan
- Təklə, Jalilabad, Azerbaijan
- Təklə, Kurdamir, Azerbaijan
- Təklə, Masally, Azerbaijan

== See also ==
- Təhlə (disambiguation)
