= War crimes in the Tigray war =

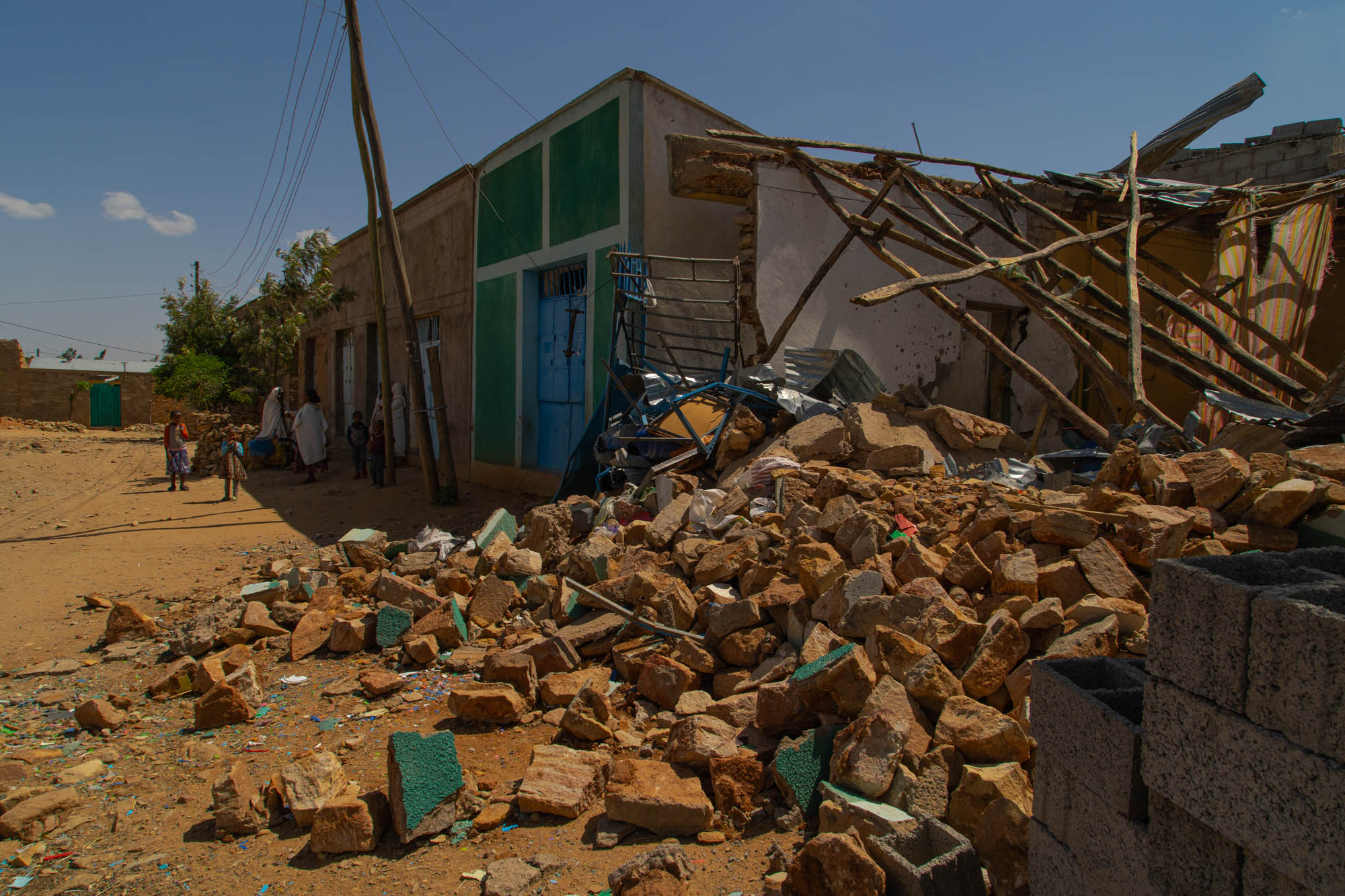
A house destroyed during a battle to control Hawzen, Tigray.

All sides of the Tigray war have been repeatedly accused of committing war crimes since it began in November 2020. In particular, the Ethiopian federal government, the State of Eritrea, the Tigray People's Liberation Front (TPLF) and Amhara Special Forces (ASF) have been the subject of numerous reports of both war crimes and crimes against humanity.

Government-allied forces had engaged in torture, ethnic cleansing and widespread sexual violence, and have faced accusations of committing a genocide against Tigrayans. The Tigray Defense Forces (TDF) also engaged in the extrajudicial killings of civilians, war rape, using civilians as human shields, and widespread looting and destruction of civilian infrastructure in the Afar and Amhara Regions.

== Crimes against humanity ==
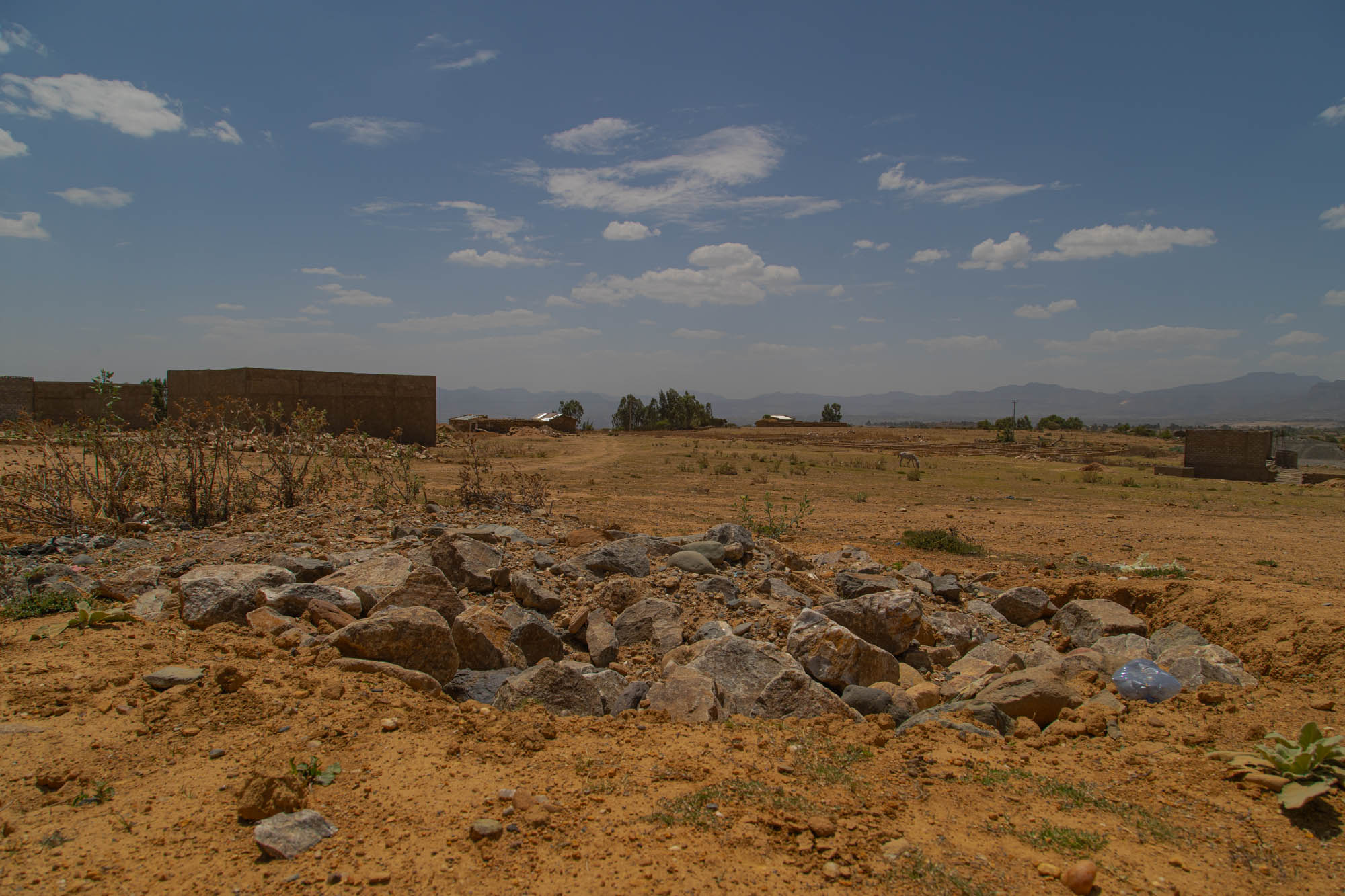
A mass grave of civilians in Tigray

The EHRC claimed in November 2020 that the Mai Kadra massacre could constitute a crime against humanity. Human Rights Concern Eritrea claimed in February 2021 that crimes against humanity occurred during the war, in particular in the "appalling treatment of Eritrean refugees in the Shimelba and Hitsats camps" and called for an immediate independent international enquiry.

Many sources have accused the Ethiopian and Eritrean governments of engaging in crimes against humanity via ethnic cleansing of Tigrayans. In its 26 February 2021 report on the Axum massacre, Amnesty International described the indiscriminate shelling of Axum by the ENDF and EDF in January 2021 as possibly "amount[ing] to war crimes", and the following mass executions of Axum civilians by Eritrean troops as a crime against humanity.

=== Wartime sexual violence ===
War rape and sexual violence were widespread throughout the war, and was perpetrated by virtually all sides. According to one witness in May 2021, girls as young as 8 and women as old as 72 were among those being raped. Such sexual violence was often accompanied by other forms of physical and mental abuse. Physical abuses included burning their victims with hot iron or cigarettes, forcing metal rods or nails into their victim's genitals, etc. Mental abuses included raping their victim in front of their family members, forcing their victims to rape their family members, calling their victims derogatory words and ethnic slurs, etc. After being subjected to sexual violence, many women became infected with STIs like HIV, and often found difficulty seeking treatments due to a combination of shame and the collapse of medical infrastructure due to the war.

A UN investigation in September 2022 confirmed the reports of widespread rape and sexual violence by all parties, including the practice of mass rape as perceived retribution by the TDF, as well as the use of sexual slavery by Ethiopian and Eritrean forces.

==== Sexual violence by the ENDF, EDF and ASF ====
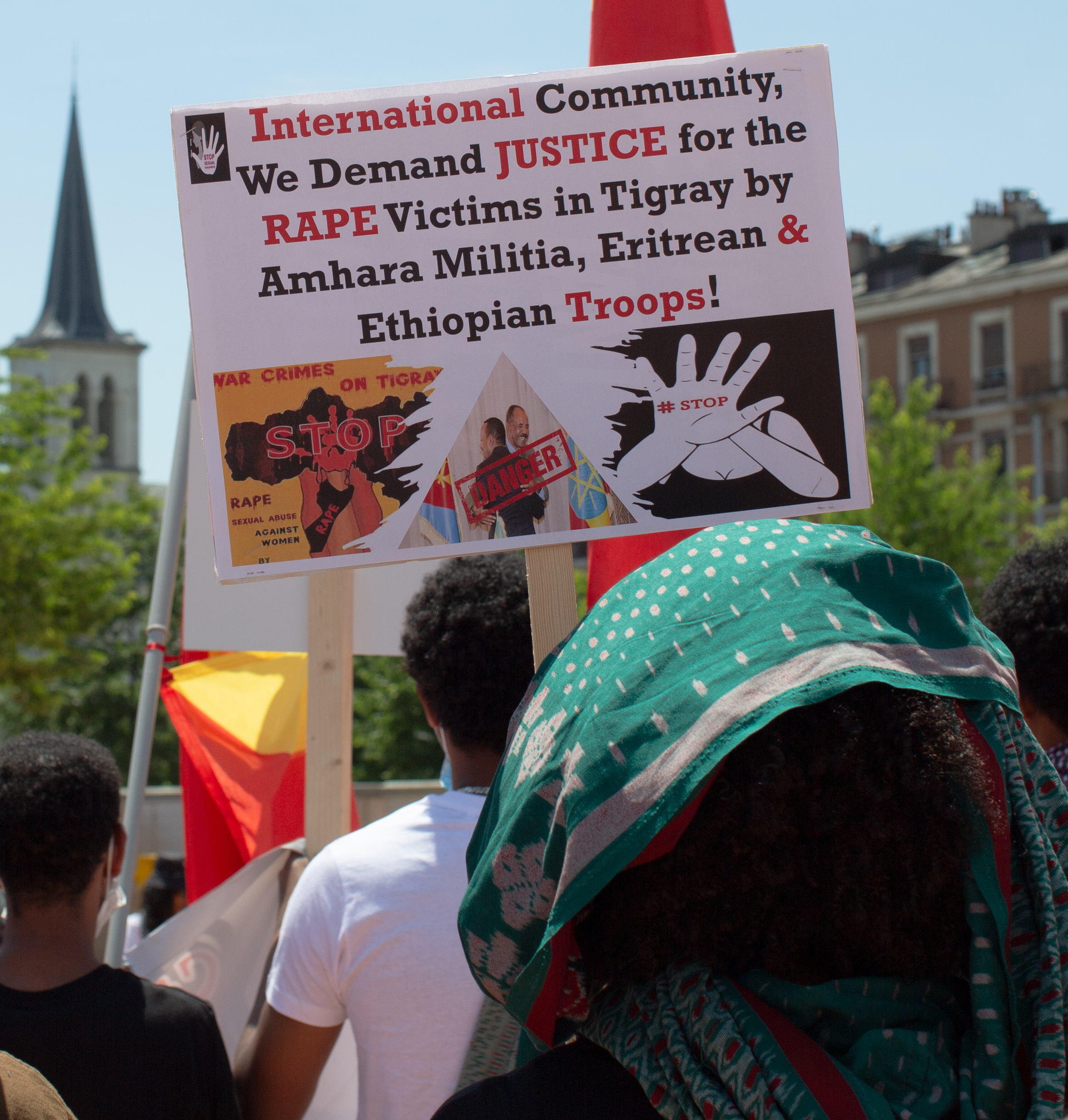
Sign held at a protest, condemning sexual violence committed by Ethiopian, Eritrean and Amhara forces

Soldiers and militias often subjected Tigrayan women and girls (including pregnant women and young girls) to rape, gang rape, sexual slavery, sexual mutilation, and other forms of sexual torture. According to nine doctors in Ethiopia and one in a Sudanese refugee camp interviewed by CNN, sexual violence in the Tigray war violated laws regarding rape as a weapon of war. The women treated by the doctors stated that the ENDF, EDF and ASF soldiers who raped them described Tigrayans as having no history and culture, that the intent was to "ethnically cleans[e] Tigray", to "Amharise" them or remove their Tigrayan identity and "blood line." One of the doctors, Tedros Tefera, stated, "Practically this has been a genocide." In March 2021, The Daily Telegraph argued that testimonies supported the view that sexual violence was being weaponized, stating that "Survivors, doctors, aid workers and experts speaking to the Telegraph all pointed to rape being systematically used as a weapon of war by Ethiopian and Eritrean forces." Reasons for the rape that were stated to the victims included the aim of "cleansing Tigrayan blood." These reports of targeted, mass sexual violence against Tigrayans was corroborated by an April 2022 joint Human Rights Watch–Amnesty International report on the Western Zone, describing similar occurrences.

==== Sexual violence by Tigrayan rebel forces ====
In January 2022, Amnesty International published a report stating that acts of rape and violence by the TPLF in the Amhara Region "may have been committed as part of a systematic attack against the Amhara civilian population." Survivors spoke of being gang raped, beaten and called ethnic slurs, often in front of their children. Reportedly, some TPLF fighters used the rape of Tigrayan women by pro-government forces as a justification for committing sexual violence themselves. In March 2022, the EHRC published a report stating that the TDF committed widespread and systematic acts of sexual violence against women and girls in the Afar and Amhara regions, including through gang rape and rape with foreign objects.

=== Ethnic cleansing of Tigrayans in the Western Zone ===
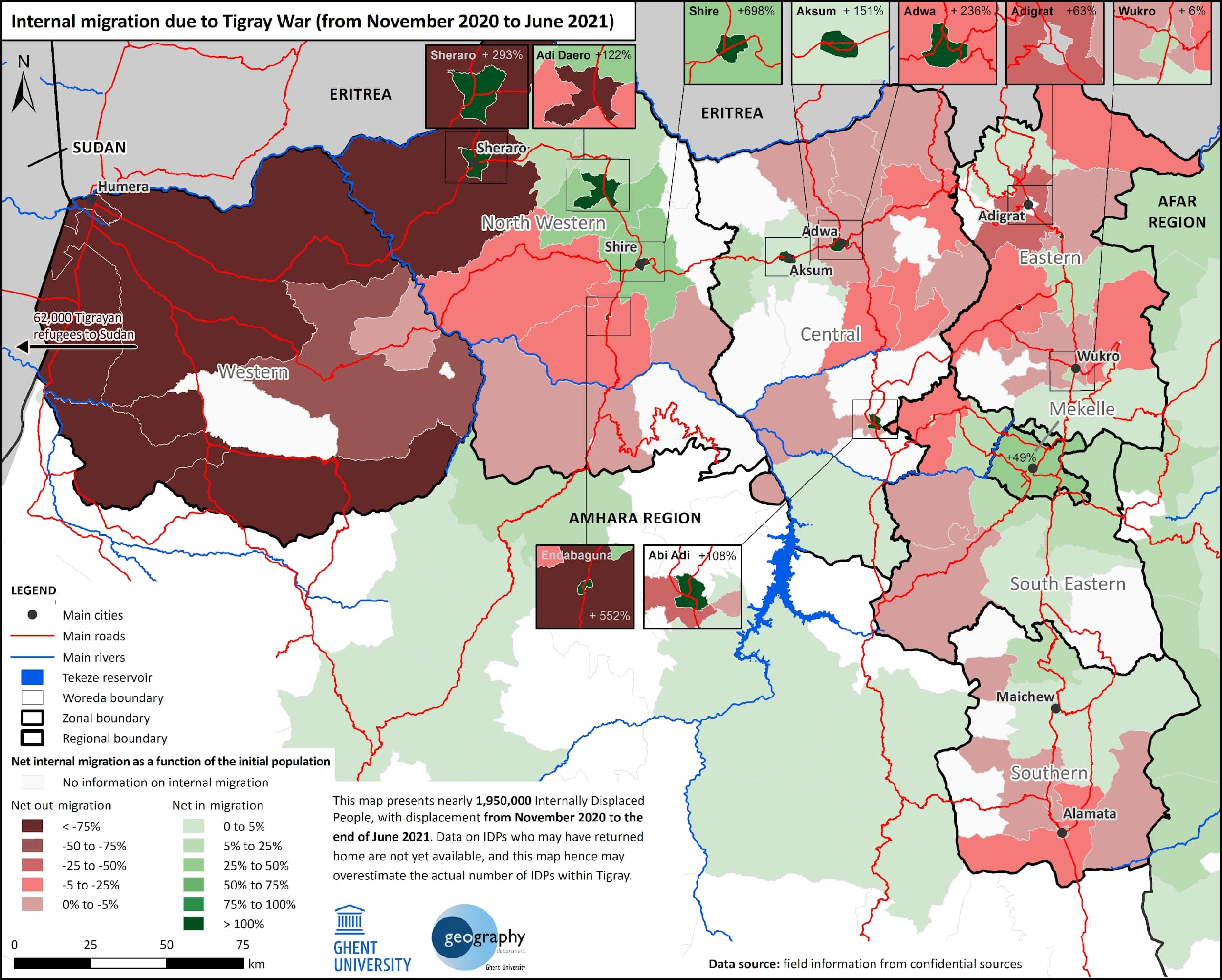
Internal migration due to the Tigray war. Red is a decrease in population while green is an increase; a significant exodus from the Western Zone is shown (11 June 2021).

According to a report by The New York Times released in February 2021, confidential U.S. government documents described Amhara Region officials and armed forces as carrying out ethnic cleansing in the Western Zone, "deliberately and efficiently rendering Western Tigray ethnically homogeneous through the organized use of force and intimidation […] Whole villages were severely damaged or completely erased." Many Tigrayans fled across the border to Sudan, and those unable to flee were captured, and forcibly transferred to other parts of Tigray. In March, the United Nations Office for the Coordination of Humanitarian Affairs (OCHA) stated that "tens of thousands of people [had] been displaced from [the Western Zone] allegedly on ethnic grounds." The OCHA also confirmed that the zone was run by Amhara regional authorities, with humanitarian access "only [being] possible through Amhara Region." The Norwegian Refugee Council estimated that between 140,000 and 185,000 people had fled from the Western Zone to Shire, in the span of around 2 weeks in March 2021.

In contrast to towns with majority Tigrayan populations, the Times said that towns with majority Amhara populations were "thriving, with bustling shops, bars and restaurants."

In a 240-page report by Human Rights Watch and Amnesty International released on 6 April 2022, it was documented that Amhara Special Forces engaged in systemic campaigns deliberately targeting Tigrayans in the Western Zone. Tigrayans were often killed en masse, forcibly expelled, or otherwise experienced a number of crimes against humanity, including torture, rape, sex slavery, forced disappearances and arbitrary detention. In some cases, the Mai Kadra massacre was used as a justification to commit mass killings in "revenge", while in other cases, there was "little apparent motive beyond spreading terror." According to one witness, recounting what she discovered upon returning to her hometown in December 2020:

In Dansha, I saw the heads of people who had been beheaded around the gates of my home. The people say that Tigrayans' dead bodies shouldn't go to the grave.... The smell of dead bodies. I saw bodies where limbs were separating itself from each other because they had been left out for too long.

Tigrayans had their personal documents either confiscated or destroyed, and while the new Western Zone authorities issued new ID cards, they were reportedly not given to Tigrayans. The aforementioned IDs were required to access any essential service in the area, and when one resident attempted to get one, an administrator allegedly told him that orders "from above" were made to not give them to Tigrayans.

Tigrayans were also told, in no uncertain terms, to leave the Western Zone or be killed; some recalled seeing pamphlets telling them to leave within 24 or 72 hours if they did not want to die. 42 Tigrayans who were interviewed by Reuters gave broadly similar accounts of receiving papers explicitly mentioning this, with some of them also saying that they witnessed Tigrayans being rounded up by "Amhara gunmen." At the same time, federal Ethiopian and Amhara forces prevented civilians from trying to cross the border into Sudan, telling them to go back to their homes "in an apparent attempt to present a veneer of normalcy."

==== Denial and obfuscation ====
Both Amhara and federal Ethiopian authorities had repeatedly denied that ethnic cleansing or targeted ethnic violence was taking place in the area. Prime Minister Abiy dismissed reports of crimes committed by the ASF, saying in an April 2021 speech to Ethiopian parliament that "portraying [the Amhara Special Forces] as a looter and conqueror is very wrong." The Ministry of Foreign Affairs said Ethiopia "vehemently opposes such accusations," describing them as "completely unfounded," "spurious" and "[blown] out of proportion."

Yabsira Eshetie, the administrator of the occupied Western Zone, claimed that "no one was kicking them out, no one was destroying their houses even. […] It is lawful here", and said that "only criminals had been detained." Gizachew Muluneh, head of Amhara Regional Communication Affairs, denied the reports of ethnic cleansing in the Western Zone, calling it "propaganda", and claiming that the number of displaced Tigrayans was exaggerated. Gizachew also said, in response to U.S. criticism, that "these areas are not Tigrayan areas, [historically]. […] Our forces are not in the Tigrayan areas, rather our forces are in Amhara", making an apparent revanchist claim that the Western Zone belongs to the Amhara Region.

==== Allegations of evidence destruction ====
The BBC reported on 7 May 2022 that, according to the testimonies of 15 eyewitnesses, the ASF and Fano militias – throughout the occupied Western Zone – began systemically digging up mass graves of ethnic Tigrayans, burning their bodies, and moving them to another, separate location. Witnesses stated that this started to occur a few days after funding for a UN war crimes investigation into the Tigray war was approved in March 2022 (which Ethiopia voted against). This practice is alleged to have occurred Humera, Adebay and Beaker.

==== Ethnic cleansing after the signing of the Pretoria agreement ====
Charges of forced removals of Tigrayans continued into late 2022, even as peace agreements were being signed and implemented by the federal government and the TPLF. On 10 November, according to an aid group (which chose to remain anonymous), over 2,800 people (including children) were held in detention centres for at least a year, before Fano militias rounded them up into trucks and moved them to a town near Sheraro in the North Western Zone, which lies outside of Amhara's territorial claims.

== Removal of basic services ==
=== Looting and deliberate starvation ===
==== Looting by federal Ethiopian, Eritrean and Amhara forces ====
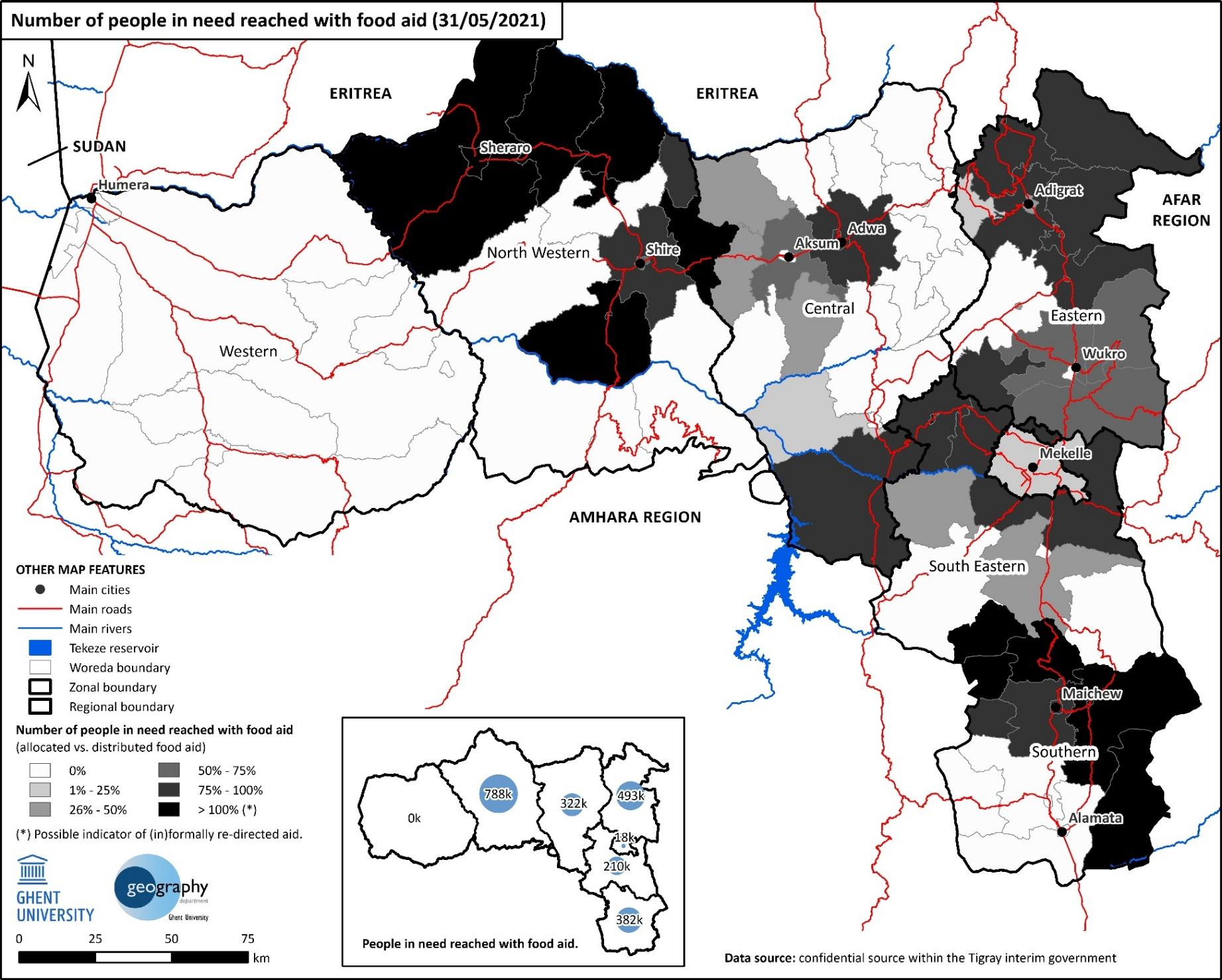
Map of Tigray showing the number of people in need that were reached with food aid (May 2021)

Human Rights Watch and Amnesty International described Tigrayans being targeted with impunity, both by military and civilian groups:

Federal and allied forces looted Tigrayan homes, businesses, livestock, and crops as they took over towns and villages. Amhara Special Forces, Fano militias, and Eritrean military forces […] carried out the bulk of the looting, but groups in civilian clothes, some armed, others not, later joined them. […] Two interviewees said they saw security force members loot homes and businesses, selectively targeting Tigrayan property.

Anti-Tigrayan forces engaged in what HRW and Amnesty described as "pillag[ing]", with "schools, courts, churches, and health centers", in addition to civilian houses, being subject to looting. Amhara and Eritrean forces also took harvests, livestock and medicine from Tigrayan farmers, who were threatened with violence if they did not comply; these actions caused the looted areas to face "extreme starvation" by June 2021. Multiple witnesses, from separate villages, gave similar descriptions of Amhara militias and security forces "waiting for farmers to collect or harvest [sorghum crops] before stealing [them]." The new government of the occupied Western Zone did little to help the local Tigrayan population, and in a number of cases, actively participated in marginalizing and discriminating against them. The HRW–Amnesty report described them as "complicit in the theft of Tigrayan property". The authorities placed restrictions on their ability to harvest food, and denied them access to international aid.

A witness to the Axum massacre stated that the EDF "burned crops […] forced farmers and priests to slaughter their own animals […] stole medicine from health facilities and destroyed the infrastructure." Reports of Eritrean looting continued into late 2022, with allegations that the EDF was seizing food and other materials from Tigrayan homes, in violation of the November 2022 peace agreement.

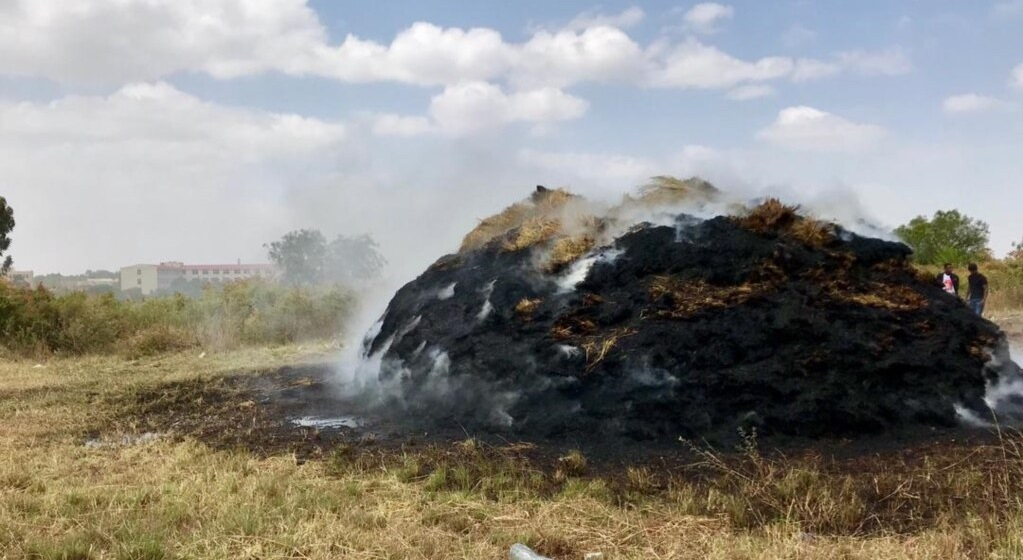
Crops burning due an Ethiopian airstrike; located in a farmer's field east of Mekelle University, October 2021

Mark Lowcock, who formerly led OCHA, stated in October 2021 that the Ethiopian federal government was deliberately starving Tigray, "running a sophisticated campaign to stop aid getting in" and that there was "not just an attempt to starve six million people but an attempt to cover up what's going on." Ethiopian troops had reportedly withheld food from going to Tigrayan civilians who were suspected of having links to Tigrayan fighters. A student based in Europe, and in contact with her family in Tigray Region, said that in the Irob woreda where her family lives, "If you don't bring your father, your brothers, you don't get the aid, you'll starve." De Waal argued that the looting by the EDF of cars, generators, food stores, cattle, sheep and goats in the Tigray Region was a violation of international criminal law that "prohibits a belligerent from removing, destroying or rendering useless objects indispensable to the survival of the civilian population" (Rome Statute, Article 7, 2.(b)).

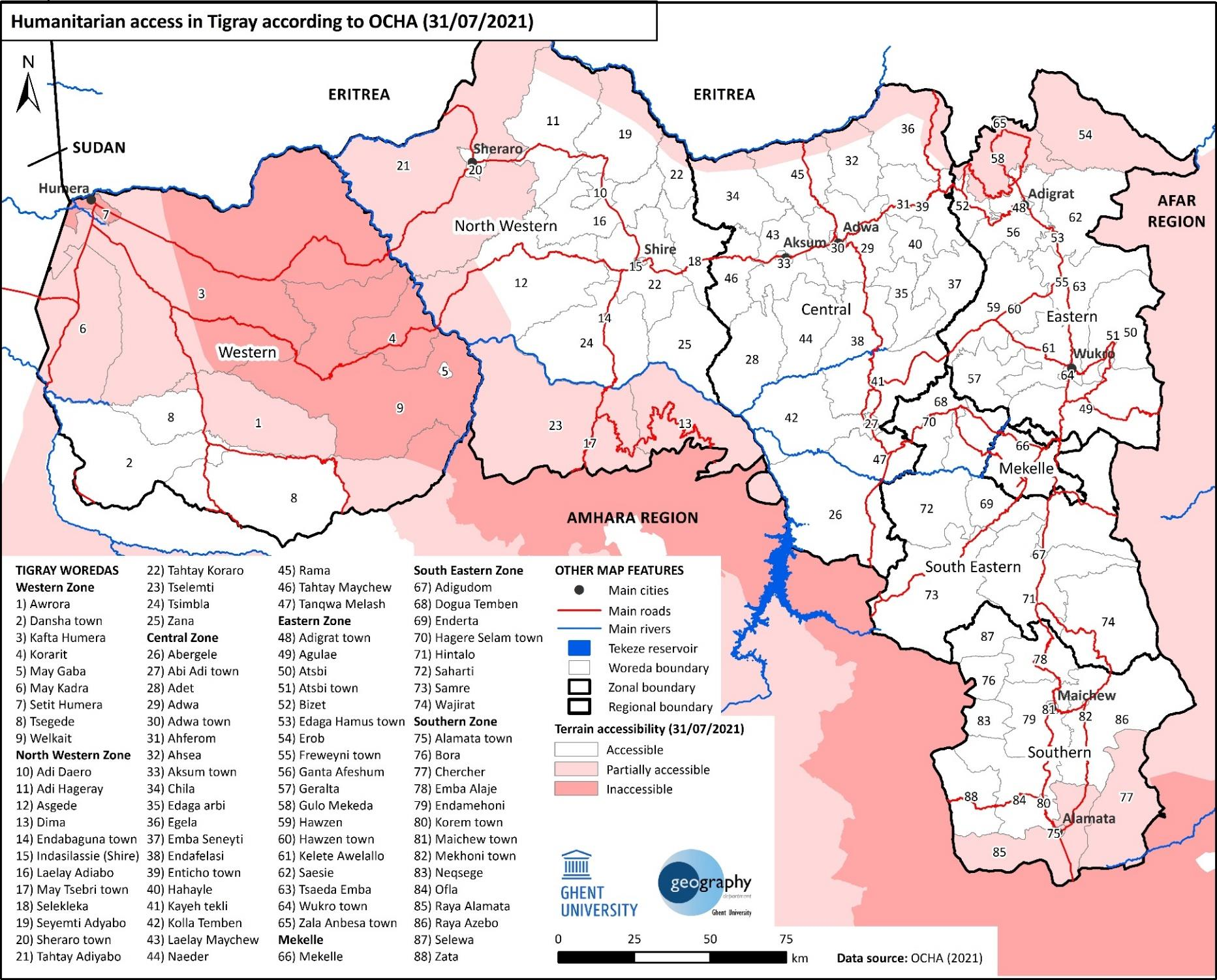
Restricted humanitarian access in Tigray due to the war (July 2021); the darkest shade of red is for areas that are considered inaccessible.

In early April 2021, the World Peace Foundation argued that Article 8(2)(b)(xxv) of the Rome Statute of the International Criminal Court was likely to be relevant to the case of starvation in the Tigray war. The authors concluded that the Ethiopian and Eritrean governments were responsible for starvation, listing evidence in Section 4 of their report. The authors argued that "circumstantial evidence suggest[ed] that [the starvation was] intentional, systematic and widespread." Additionally, a September 2022 UN commission concluded that the Ethiopian government, along with forces allied with them, engaged in deliberate efforts to deny the Tigray Region "access to basic services […] and humanitarian assistance," leaving 90% of Tigrayan residents in dire conditions. The commission also stated that they had "reasonable grounds to believe" that the Ethiopian government was using deliberate starvation as a war tactic, and called on both the federal government and the TPLF to let these services resume without hindrance.

In June 2023, the Lowenstein Human Rights Clinic of Yale Law School, in a summary of its 18-month study mostly based on public reports, stated that the Ethiopian federal government and its allies had extensively looted and attacked and blocked supplies of food, water, healthcare, electricity, cash, fuel, and humanitarian relief in Tigray during the war. The report stated that they were using starvation as a method of combat, in violation of international humanitarian law, and called for investigations to determine if these actions constituted war crimes, crimes against humanity or genocide.

==== Looting by Tigrayan forces ====
A March 2022 Ethiopian Human Rights Commission (EHRC) report stated that the TDF "carried out widespread and organized pillaging, looting and destruction" of civilian infrastructure in the Amhara and Afar Regions, including government offices, businesses, schools and healthcare facilities; 2,409 health facilities were destroyed or damaged; a total of 4,310 schools damaged, of which 1,090 were "completely destroyed". The report concluded that the conduct of the TDF was the biggest cause of forced displacement in Amhara and Afar.

Analysis of satellite imagery, done by UK-based researchers at DX Open Network, confirmed that Tigrayan forces burned a farming village to the ground near the town of Agamsa in Kobo district, Amhara Region; according to the researchers, the village in question did not appear to be used for military purposes. A report by The Telegraph characterized these actions as "war crimes".

=== Attacks on humanitarian workers ===
There have been several reported attacks on humanitarian workers, including attacks by Ethiopian government soldiers. The Danish Refugee Council and the International Rescue Committee reported killings of their staff in early December 2020. Although the Ethiopian federal government claimed to have given "full and unhindered access for humanitarian actors to operate in all parts of the [Tigray] region," many humanitarian agencies reported having been repulsed at army checkpoints and blocked from entry to various regions. There were accusations by US officials that armed forces were specifically singling out humanitarian workers for an attack. Violence against healthcare workers and the destruction of health facilities is a violation of international laws regarding medical neutrality, and has been described as such in regards to the Tigray war.

On 23 March 2021, a driver from Médecins Sans Frontières was beaten by Ethiopian soldiers after witnessing extrajudicial killings by Ethiopian government soldiers. Following the 23 June bombing of Togoga, there were reports of Ethiopian government soldiers firing on ambulances to prevent them from reaching the injured. On 25 June 2021, three MSF workers were found murdered near their car in Tigray.

== Massacres and killings of civilians ==
Aftermath of a massacre in Hagere Selam, Tigray. (December 2020)

In early February 2021, a writer for Ethiopia Insight, who had spent two months walking between villages in central Tigray, described scenes of towns and cities being completely abandoned, and that "once the center of trade, exchange and hope", they had turned into "the scene of war crimes that [can] never be fully articulated".

=== Massacres by ENDF and EDF-allied forces ===
Extrajudicial executions of civilians by the ENDF and EDF were reported in and around Adigrat, Hagere Selam, Hitsats, Humera, Irob, Axum, Chefa Robit, and Amuru, among others.

==== Axum ====
Witnesses and survivors, including refugees in Sudan, reported that the Eritrean Defence Forces carried out a massacre in Axum that killed between 100 and 800 civilians in late November 2020. These reports have been corroborated by a number of news agencies and human rights organizations. The Eritrean government denied these allegations, and expressed anger at Amnesty International's report on the massacre, claiming it was "transparently unprofessional" and "politically motivated," accusing Amnesty of fabricating evidence.

A witness to the first part of the Axum massacre stated that the EDF soldiers had been ordered to kill all Tigrayan males older than four years old. Alem Berhe, who was in Mekelle on 3 November, on the evening of which the Northern Command attacks occurred, escaped to Addis Ababa after two months. Alem stated that the EDF's orders were "to exterminate you [Tigrayans] – all of you" above the age of seven years. Another witness described the limit as either "any male over the age of 14" or "those who 'pee against the wall.'"

==== Debre Abbay ====
Screenshot of footage showing the alleged aftermath of a war crime near Debre Abbay. Dead bodies of people wearing civilian clothing are seen.

In February 2021, footage surfaced on the internet showing what appeared to be the aftermath of a massacre, roughly geolocated near the Debre Abbay monastery. The videos (dated 5 January 2021) featured multiple people wearing Ethiopian army uniforms and speaking Amharic, with one noted as saying "you should have finished off the survivors." The video's authenticity was verified by multiple news outlets as genuine, with total estimates of dead civilians ranging from between 30 and 40. The Daily Telegraph described the full video as "too graphic to publish."

==== Mahbere Dego ====
In early March 2021 (and again in June that same year), graphic video clips surfaced of a massacre taking place in Mahbere Dego, Tigray. Soldiers in ENDF uniforms were recorded rounding up a group of unarmed men in civilian clothing, "shooting them at point-blank range", and tossing their bodies off of a nearby cliff. Investigations by CNN World and BBC Africa Eye (in collaboration with Bellingcat and Newsy) judged the footage to be authentic.

Amharic-language conversations can be heard in the footage, with one voice saying "I wish we could pour gas over them and burn them"; another voice can be heard saying "This is the end of woyane (Note: "Woyane" is another term for the TPLF) […] we don't show mercy."

=== Massacres by the TDF and allied forces ===
==== Chenna and Kobo ====
In early September 2021, the Tigray Defense Forces were accused of extrajudicially killing 120–200 villagers in Chenna Teklehaymanot and 600 residents of Kobo district in the Amhara Region. In both incidents, residents said that Tigrayan forces had killed villagers who had resisted looting. On 9 December 2021, Human Rights Watch published a report in which residents described witnessing Tigrayan forces summarily execute dozens of civilians in the village of Chenna and the town of Kobo between 31 August and 9 September 2021.

=== Disputed perpetrators ===
==== Mai Kadra ====
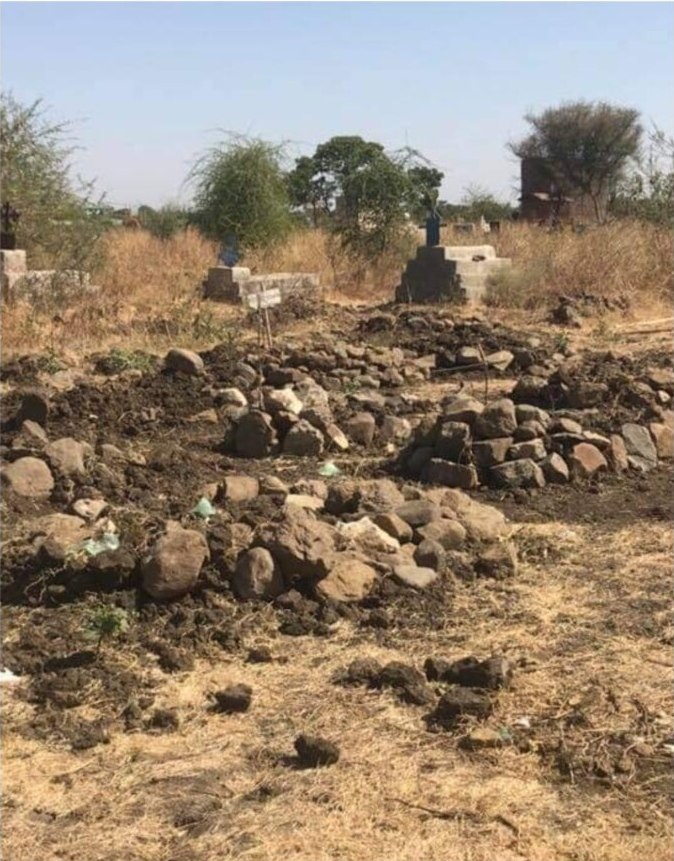
Mass grave for victims of the Mai Kadra massacre.

The Mai Kadra massacre was a and carried out during the on 9–10 November 2020 in the town of in (a disputed area between the Amhara and Tigray Regions) in northwestern , near the . The victims have been described as civilians, many of whom were day laborers hailing from neighboring . Responsibility was attributed to a pro- (TPLF) youth group and forces loyal to the TPLF in the , preliminary investigations by (AI), the (EHRC) and the (EHRCO), and interviews conducted in Mai Kadra by . The (OHCHR) and EHRC reported that at least 5 Tigrayans were also killed in Mai Kadra by militas such as in retaliation. Tigrayan refugees in Sudan told multiple news outlets that Tigrayans in Mai Kadra were targeted by either Amhara militias, the (ENDF), or both.

=== Bombing of civilian targets ===
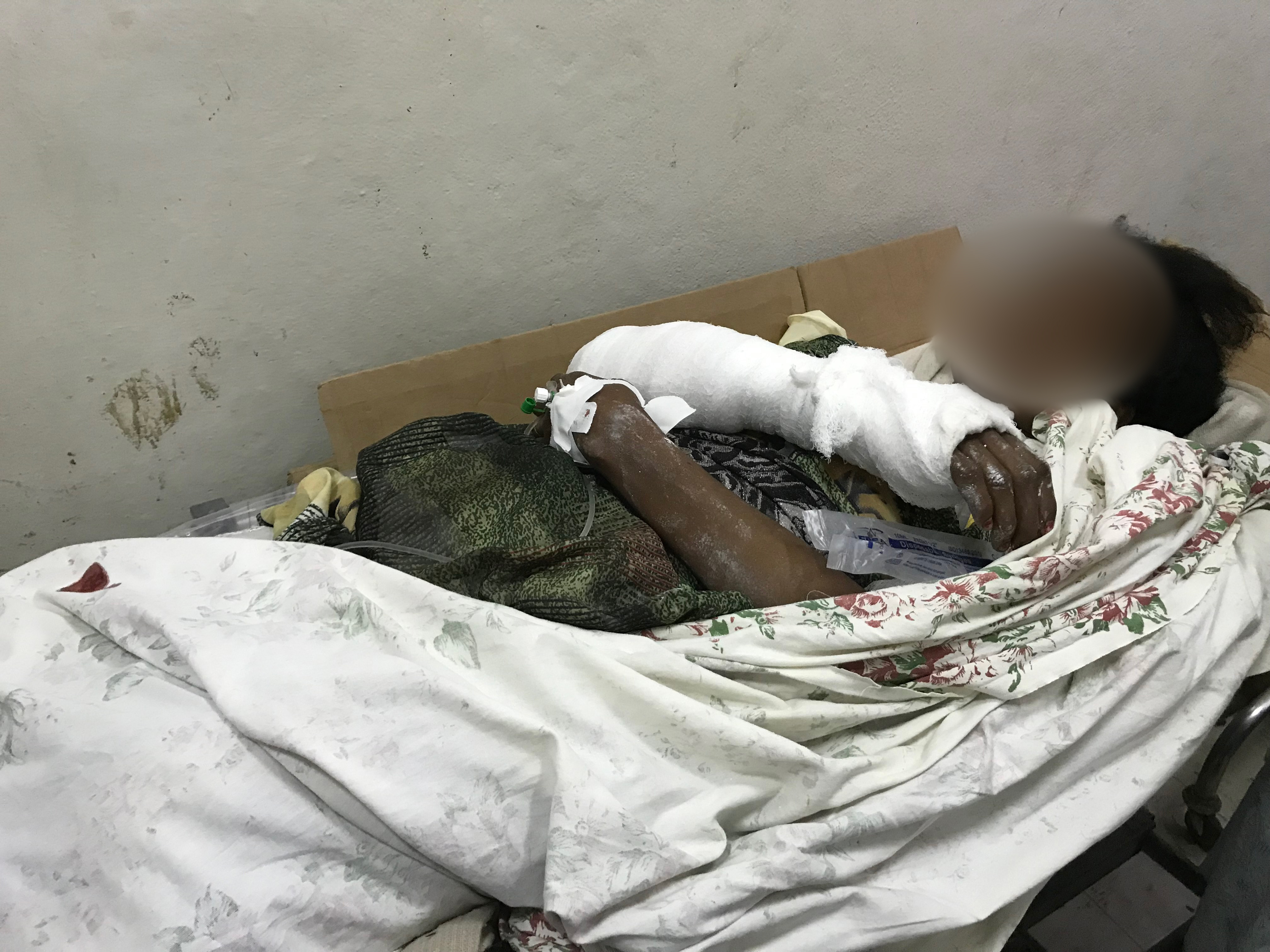
A victim of the Togoga airstrike, 25 June 2021.

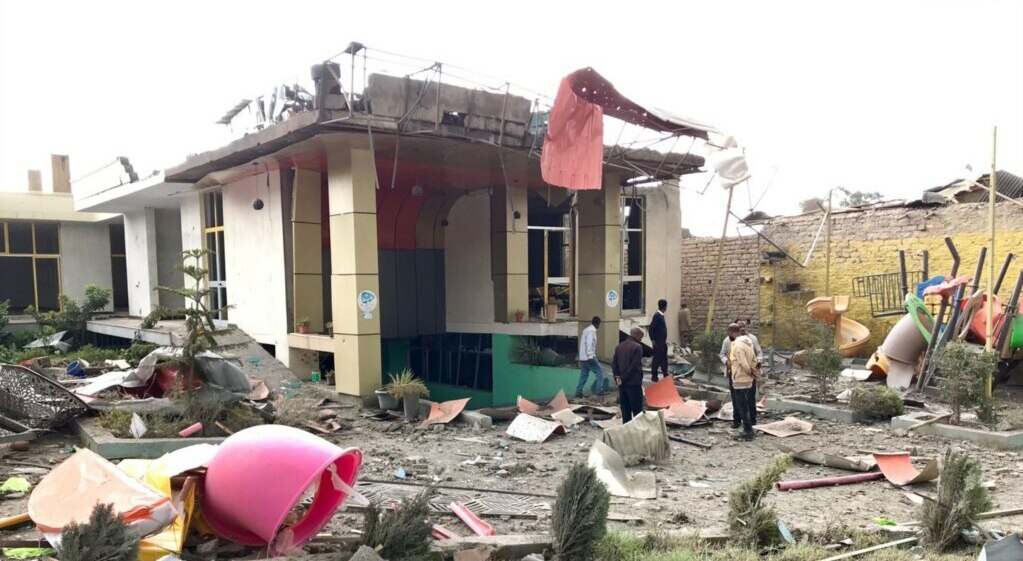
Buildings in Mekelle destroyed by an airstrike on 26 August 2022.

Human Rights Watch stated that, during the early days of the war, Ethiopian forces launched artillery attacks which struck hospitals, schools, and markets in Mekelle, Humera and Shire, killing at least 83 civilians, including children, and wounding over 300. In each of these attacks, the Tigrayan special forces had already retreated. In places that had armed forces present such as Humera, the presence of local militias was too insignificant to defend the town. In Humera, local residents said artillery fire also came from Eritrea on 9 November 2020.

In August 2021, the TDF indiscriminately shelled and killed 107 civilians, including 27 children, and injured 35 civilians during an offensive in Galikoma, Afar Region.

In an airstrike on 22 June 2021, the Ethiopian Air Force killed 64 civilians in Togogwa (Southwestern Tigray) and injured 180 others. In January 2022, the Ethiopian Ari Force also launched an airstrike into an IDP camp located in Dedebit, killing at least 56. Both Human Rights Watch and UN investigators have characterized this as a war crime.

== Mistreatment of prisoners ==
=== Mistreatment by the TPLF/TDF ===
==== Northern Command attacks (November 2020) ====
According to Abiy Ahmed, ENDF prisoners of war were executed by the TPLF during the Northern Command attacks. Abiy stated that the "TPLF identified and separated hundreds of unarmed Ethiopian soldiers of non-Tigrayan origin, tied their hands and feet together, massacred them in cold blood, and left their bodies lying in open air." He suggested that the TPLF forces had "record[ed] themselves singing and dancing on the bodies of their victims." The Tigray Regional Government denied this.

=== Mistreatment by the ENDF ===
==== Detention of Tigrayan and Oromo civilians ====
According to an investigation by Reuters, thousands of Tigrayan civilians were forcibly detained and held without trial throughout Ethiopia. Tens of thousands of Tigrayans (alongside some Oromo) were arrested between November 2020 and February 2022, with roughly 9,000 still being imprisoned by June 2022, many of them in makeshift facilities. Of these 9,000 detainees, around 2,900 were moved to a single, 18-cell prison surrounded by barbed wire in Mizan Teferi, South West Region.

The prison in Mizan Teferi suffered from severe overcrowding and poor sanitation; some of these prisoners said that hundreds of people were crammed into their cells, and many were exposed to lice, meningitis and malaria. At least 17 prisoners had died due to these conditions, and similar accounts were reported to have occurred elsewhere in the country.

==== Mirab Abaya prison camp massacre (November 2021) ====
In December 2022, a report by The Washington Post described a massacre of detained Tigrayan soldiers (which left 83 dead and around 20 missing) occurred in November 2021 at a prison camp in Mirab Abaya, SSNPR. (Note: The Washington Post stated that their description of the massacre was "based on 26 interviews with prisoners, medical personnel, officials, local residents and relatives", as well as "a review of satellite imagery, social media posts and medical records.") According to the Post, the soldiers in question had not engaged in fighting against the government; Article 3 of the Fourth Geneva Convention states that "Persons taking no active part in the hostilities, including members of armed forces […] placed hors de combat by sickness, wounds, detention, or any other cause, shall in all circumstances be treated humanely".

During Tigrayan celebrations for Saint Michael's Day, a group of Ethiopian prison guards began shooting and killing the prisoners. Fearing the violence, other prisoners ran into the woods, where they were pursued by ENDF soldiers. When the Tigrayan prisoners encountered local civilians, they tried asking for their help; instead, the locals began attacking them as well. A lynch mob of between 150 and 200 people formed, using "machetes, sticks and stones" to kill the prisoners. A survivor of these attacks alleged that many of them "begged for mercy" as they were killed, and others jumped into a nearby lake in an attempt to escape.

== Other war crimes ==
=== Allegations of white phosphorus use on civilians ===
On 24 May 2021, a report by The Telegraph featured pictures of severe burn victims, and detailed accounts from them and their families, who described incendiary weapons being launched into multiple civilian areas in Central and Eastern Tigray throughout the month of April. Chemical weapons experts, including former Joint CBRN Regiment commander Hamish de Bretton-Gordon and Dan Kaszeta of the Royal United Services Institute, considered their injuries to bare a strong resemblance with those caused by white phosphorus munitions. Witnesses attributed responsibility for the attacks to Ethiopian and Eritrean forces, and said that fighting was not happing in these areas when the attacks occurred.

Ethiopia rejected the claims of the Telegraph report, with the Ministry of Foreign Affairs saying that the country "has not employed and will never use such banned munitions," further stating that it takes the Chemical Weapons Convention "extremely seriously."

=== Collective punishment ===
An anonymous former member of the Transitional Government of Tigray claimed that Ethiopia and Eritrea used the destruction of the Tigrayan economy as "a tactic to defeat the enemy", arguing they succeeded in taking the region "back 40 years"; Noé Hochet-Bodin of Le Monde described this as an act of "collective punishment". On 27 May 2021, U.S. Assistant Secretary of State Robert F. Godec made the argument that the EDF and ENDF had enacted "[what] amounts to the collective punishment of the people of Tigray" through a "campaign of unremitting violence and destruction".

Beginning in mid-2022, and escalating after mobilization in September that same year, Eritrea engaged in a mass conscription campaign. Human Rights Watch reported that families of those who wished to avoid the draft became targets of collective punishment, with government authorities subjecting them to arbitrary detention and forced evictions from their homes.

=== Refoulement ===
De Waal argued that the refoulement of Eritrean refugees back to Eritrea was a violation of international law.

=== Use of civilians as human shields ===
In August 2021, in Chenna, Amhara Region, the TDF entered residential areas without allowing civilians to leave, then started shooting at ENDF positions, effectively utilizing the local population as human shields.

== Genocide claims ==
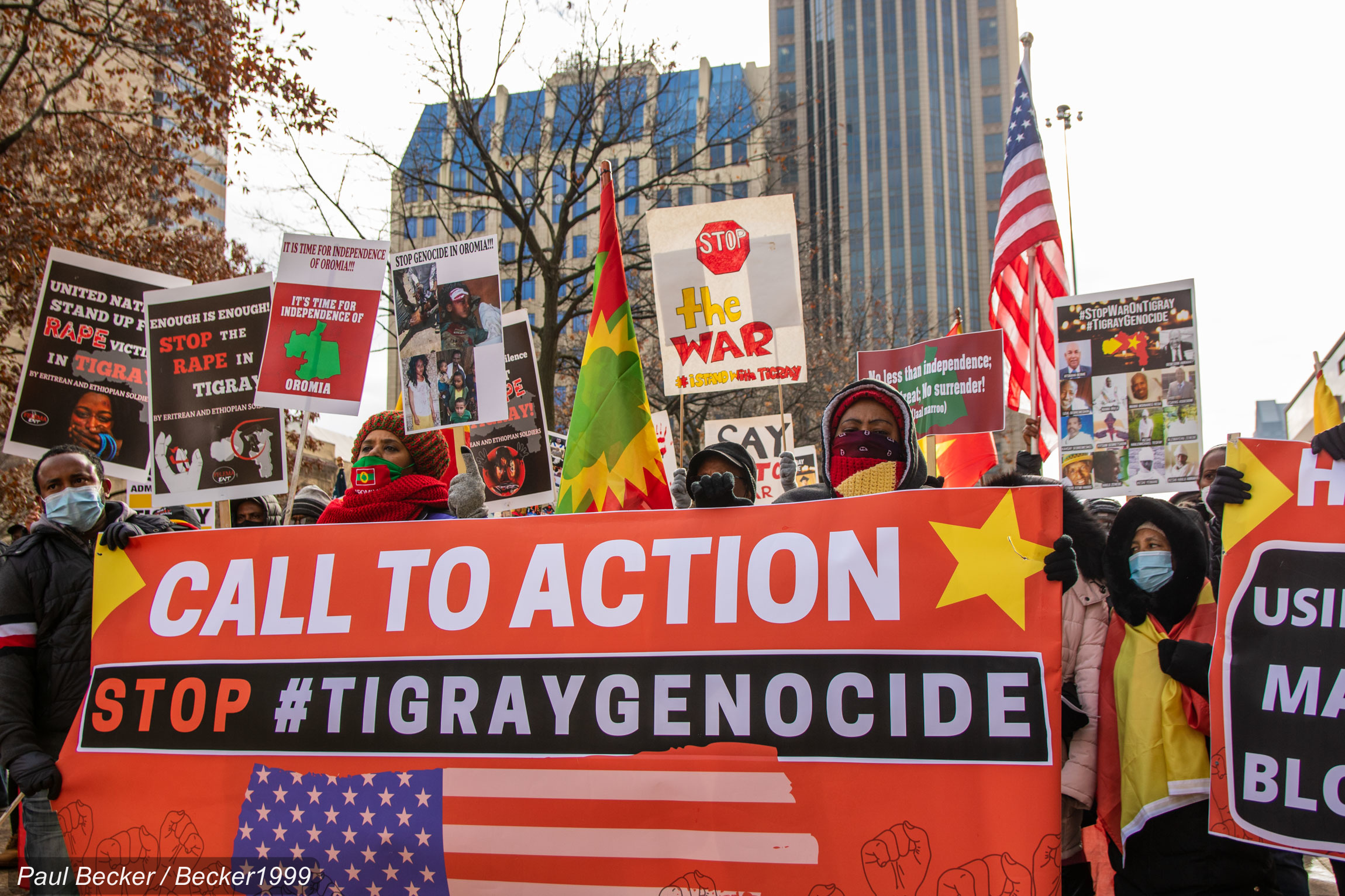
Protesters in Columbus, Ohio, USA, holding a banner saying "Call to Action: Stop #TigrayGenocide" (Dec. 2021)

The Ethiopian and Eritrean governments have been repeatedly accused of committing a genocide against Tigrayans.

In December 2020, Alex de Waal argued that Eritrean president Isaias Afwerki had "the intention of annihilating the Tigray People's Liberation Front (TPLF) and reducing Tigray to a condition of complete incapacity." De Waal argued for intent on the part of Isaias by referring to "eleven high-ranking colleagues [of Isaias], heroes of the [Eritrean War of Independence] […] and ten journalists" who were arrested in 2001 and remained missing.

Also in December 2020, Rashid Abdi, interviewed by Vice, stated that there had been two years' of planning by Ethiopian Prime Minister Abiy Ahmed and Isaias, who had "fears and suspicions about the TPLF", and stated that Abiy had "criminalised the entire TPLF, tagged them with treason." Vice also interviewed a refugee, Amanael Kahsay, who attributed part of the Mai Kadra massacre to the Fano militia, and stated "We know he is planning to exterminate us, all Tigrayans in general." According to investigations by the Office of the United Nations High Commissioner for Human Rights (OHCHR), Amnesty International, the EHRC, and the Ethiopian Human Rights Council (EHRCO), most of the victims of the Mai Kadra massacre were Amhara.

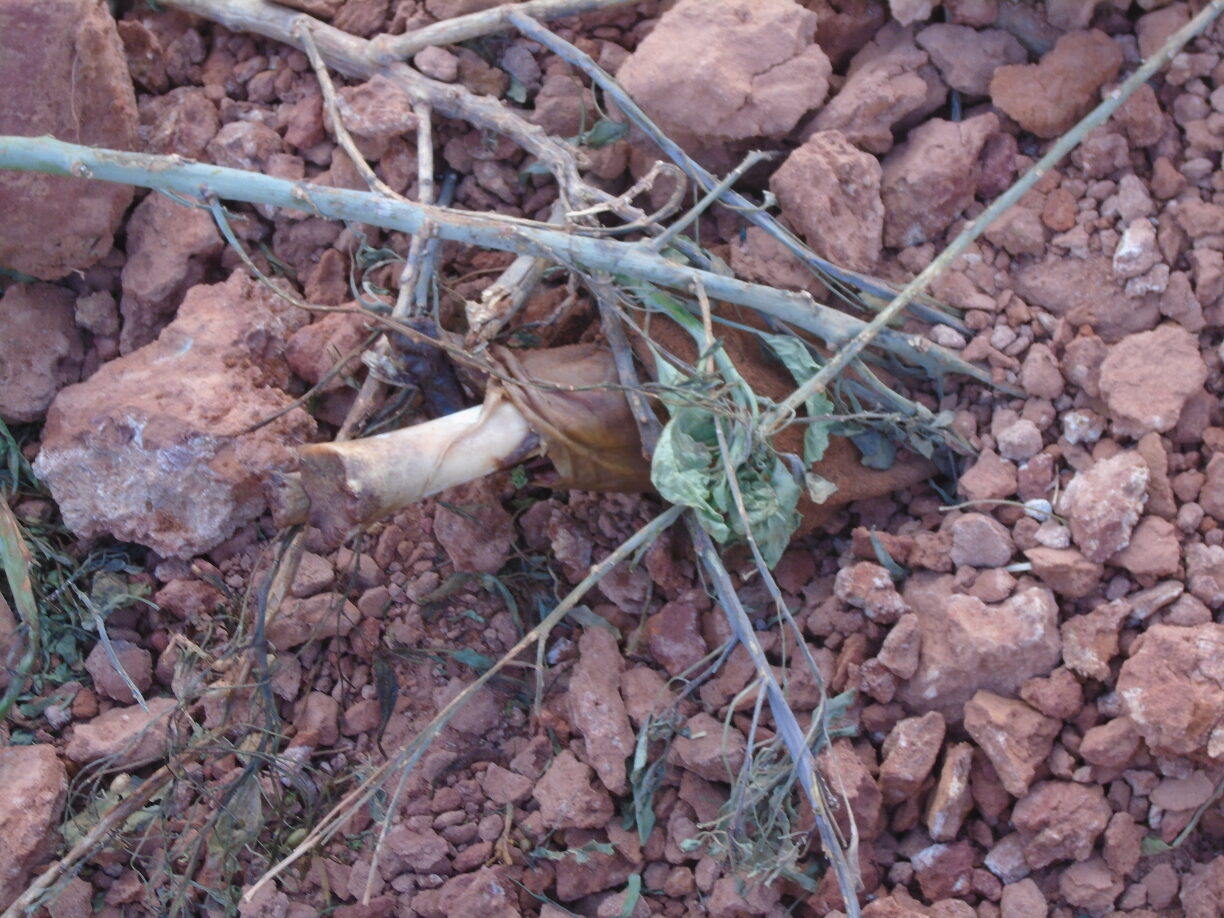
Partially buried dead body of a Tigrayan civilian, killed around mid-December 2020 in the Central Zone. A leg sticks out from the mound, half-eaten by scavengers.

On 28 January 2021, Robert I. Rotberg, a professor in governance and foreign affairs, classified the war crimes of the Tigray war using the informal term "purposeful ethnic cleansing", which he saw as "a precursor to all-out genocide." He called for the responsibility to protect procedures to be implemented. Rotberg attributed intent to Abiy, claiming that he "had seemingly decided that [the] very existence [of Tigrayans] threatened his control of 110 million Ethiopians." On 19 October 2022, World Health Organization Director-General Tedros Adhanom Ghebreyesus, who is Tigrayan himself, said that there was a "very narrow window now to prevent genocide," in response to the major wave of violence that occurred after the collapse of the March–August ceasefire that same year.

In a 120-page report published on 3 June 2024, the U.S.-based New Lines Institute stated that they had "a reasonable basis to believe" that the ENDF, EDF and ASF committed acts of genocide against Tigrayans during the war. The report argued that Ethiopia violated its obligations as a signatory to the 1948 Genocide Convention, and was critical of what it considered to be an unwillingness from world leaders to hold them accountable for their actions. They further stated Ethiopia should be made to stand trial at the International Court of Justice (ICJ).

=== Hate speech ===
On 15 June 2021, the EU's special envoy to Ethiopia, Pekka Haavisto, said that senior members of the Ethiopian government called for "wip[ing] out all Tigrayans for 100 years." The Ethiopian Government denied these allegations. In mid-September 2021, Daniel Kibret – an advisor to Prime Minister Abiy – made a speech in which he compared Tigrayan forces to Satan, and described them as "weeds" that "should be erased and disappeared from historical records." In October 2022, numerous agencies, human rights organizations and scholars began issuing warnings of dramatically escalating levels of violence and hate speech against Tigrayans, with some warning of the emergence of a possible genocide. UN adviser for genocide prevention Alice Wairimu Nderitu expressed her unease at the "horrifying levels of hate speech and incitement to violence" in the country. She gave examples of social media posts describing Tigrayans as a "cancer" or "virus," with one post expressing a desire for killing "every single youth from Tigray."

=== Views from researchers ===
In November 2020, Genocide Watch upgraded its alert status for Ethiopia as a whole to the ninth stage of genocide, extermination, referring to the Gawa Qanqa massacre, casualties of the Tigray war, Benishangul-Gumuz conflict and the Metekel massacre and listing affected groups as the Amhara, Tigrayans, Oromo, Gedeo, Gumuz, Agaw and Qemant. On 20 November 2021, Genocide Watch again issued a Genocide Emergency Alert for Ethiopia, stating that "both sides are committing genocide", and that "Prime Minister Abiy Ahmed's hate speech and calls for war" together with attacks by the ENDF and TPLF put Ethiopia into stages 4 (dehumanization), 6 (polarization), 8 (persecution), and 9 (extermination) of the ten stages of genocide.

Former Tigray rebel, peace researcher, and founder of the Institute for Peace and Security Studies, Mulugeta Gebrehiwot, stated on 27 January 2021 that the killings of Tigrayans by the ENDF and EDF were "literally genocide by decree. Wherever they're moving, whomever they find, they kill him or her, [whether it's] an old man, a child, a nursing women, or anything."

Kjetil Tronvoll, a peace and conflict studies researcher and professor at the Oslo New University College, stated in a Twitter thread on 27 February 2021 that the term genocide might apply to the actions of the EDF in the Tigray war. He stated that the federal Ethiopian authorities could hold part of the responsibility by having "invited and accommodated" the EDF to participate in the Tigray war.

Conversely, EHRC Director Daniel Bekele said the EHRC-OHCHR Joint Investigation did not identify violations amounting to genocide.

=== Views from politicians ===
The elected and deposed leader of Tigray Region, Debretsion Gebremichael, stated on 30 January 2021 that the war was a "genocidal war [that was being] waged upon the People of Tigray to illegally appropriate by force [their] identity and [their] basic right to existence." Debretsion stated that the Tigrayans were being attacked "to exterminate them with bullets and weaponized hunger."

== Legal aspects ==
=== Legal bodies ===
Kassahun Molla Yilma, former head of Jimma University School of Law and prosecutor, argued in February 2021 that for the Mai Kadra massacre of the Tigray war and other atrocities taking place in Ethiopia, it would be in Ethiopia's interests to become party to the International Criminal Court (ICC). Among other reasons, Kassahun said that joining the ICC would "help catalyze reform regarding the legal framework regulating atrocity crimes in Ethiopia", since the provisions in the Ethiopian Criminal Code at the time "[did] not fit the nature of atrocity crimes committed [in] Ethiopia", and that the ICC would the Ethiopian justice system build capacity for investigations and prosecutions for the crimes. Kassahun said that as the ICC is a court of last resort, and since Ethiopia was not, as of February 2021, a party to the ICC, war crimes committed during the Tigray war would not be tried in the ICC.

Debretsion called for Isaias and Abiy to be tried in an international court.

=== Arrests ===
Enkuayehu Mesele, head of TPLF militias in Western Zone, was arrested in Shire in mid-December 2020. Amanuel Belete, a commander in the Northern Command, accused Enkuayehu of "countless murders and intimidation" in Baeker, Qafta and Humera, of ethnic profiling of the ENDF.

=== Investigations and prosecutions ===
==== ACHPR ====
The African Commission on Human and Peoples' Rights stated that it would start a Commission of Inquiry on Tigray on 17 June 2021 under Article 45 of the African Charter on Human and Peoples' Rights. The commission was planned to initially start for three months, with headquarters in Banjul, and to "conduct investigations on the ground and in neighbouring countries when the conditions are met." The chair of the Commission of Inquiry, Rémy Ngoy Lumbu, stated that the commission's report would be published by the end of 2021.

==== EHRC–OHCHR Tigray investigation ====
In mid-2021, the EHRC and the OHCHR launched a joint investigation into human rights violations of the Tigray war committed by all parties. The EHRC–OHCHR joint investigation team's report was published on 3 November 2021.

==== International Commission of Human Rights Experts on Ethiopia ====
The International Commission of Human Rights Experts on Ethiopia (ICHREE) was established by the UN Human Rights Council in December 2021, with a mandate extended as of October 2022 to December 2023, to investigate violations of international human rights law, international humanitarian law and international refugee law in Ethiopia since 3 November 2020.

==== Commission of Inquiry on Tigray Genocide ====
The Commission of Inquiry on Tigray Genocide (CITG; Tigrinya: ኮሚሽን መፅናዕቲ ጀኖሳይድ ትግራይ) is an investigative body created in May 2022 during the Tigray war by the de facto government of Tigray Region to investigate crimes of international law, including genocide, during the Tigray war. CITG continued operations during the Interim Regional Administration of Tigray and was recognised by the federal government of Ethiopia in June 2024.
