= Tekle =

Tekle (Ge'ez, Tigrinya, Amharic: ተክለ meaning plant) may refer to the following people:

Given name

- Princess Tekle of Georgia (1776–1846), Georgian princess
- Tekle Giyorgis (disambiguation), several people
- Tekle Hailemikael, Ethiopian cyclist
- Tekle Hawaryat (1900–1969), Ethiopian politician
- Tekle Hawariat Tekle Mariyam (1884–1977), Ethiopian politician
- Tekle Haymanot (disambiguation), several people
- Tekle Kidane (born 1939), Ethiopian football player
- Tekle Kiflay, Eritrean general

Surname

- Afewerk Tekle (1932–2012), Ethiopian painter
- Tesfalem Tekle (born 1993), Eritrean footballer

== See also ==
- Təklə (disambiguation)
- Takla (disambiguation)
