= Yeniyol, Azerbaijan =

Yeniyol, Azerbaijan may refer to:

- Birinci Yeniyol
- İkinci Yeniyol
- Yeniyel
- Yeniyol, Nakhchivan
