= ZOA =

ZOA or Zoa may refer to:

- Zoa Peak, a mountain in British Columbia
- Zoa tribe, an indigenous people living in the Amazon rainforest
- ZOA International, an international NGO based in the Netherlands (originally started in "Zuidoost-Azië", southeast Asia); see Hitsats massacre § Humanitarian workers
- Zoa Morani, Indian actress
- ZOA Energy, an American energy drink brand co-founded by Dwayne Johnson
- Luc Zoa, Cameroonian footballer
- Oakland Air Route Traffic Control Center (FAA LID: ZOA)
- Zionist Organization of America, an American pro-Israel organization
- Zone of Avoidance, regions of space that are obscured from view
- "zoa", a plural suffix often used in taxonomy
- Zoa, member of the South Korean girl group Weeekly
- ZOA, an energy drink founded by wrestler and actor "The Rock" Dwayne Johnson
