= Təhlə =

Təhlə may refer to:

- Təhlə, Barda, Azerbaijan
- Təhlə, Goranboy, Azerbaijan

== See also ==
- Təklə (disambiguation)
