= Yeniyol =

Yeniyol (Turkic: "new road"), also spelled or Yeniyël or Yeniyel, may refer to:

- Yeniyol, Azerbaijan (disambiguation), several places
- Yeniyol, Kelkit, Turkey
- Yeniyol, Beşiri, Turkey
- Yeniyel, Azerbaijan
- Aghvorik, Armenia

== See also ==
- Yeni yol (disambiguation)
