= Elsa Chyrum =

British Eritrean human rights activist

- Born: United Kingdom
- Occupation: Human rights defender

Elizabeth Chyrum, known as Elsa Chyrum, is an Eritrean human rights activist based in the United Kingdom.

== Childhood and education ==
Elizabeth Chyrum was born in the United Kingdom (UK).

== Eritrean human rights activism ==
Chyrum became active in defending Eritrean human rights when 70,000 Eritreans and Ethiopians of Eritrean origin were deported to Eritrea during the Eritrean–Ethiopian War that started in 1998. She and other Eritreans in Europe created the Network of Eritrean Professionals in Europe in response. Chyrum visited Eritrea in mid 2001, witnessed the torture and imprisonment of 2000 university students, and returned to the UK. She helped to found Eritreans for Human and Democratic Rights in the UK (EHDR-UK), East and Horn of Africa Human Rights Defenders Project (EHAHRDP) and Human Rights Concern Eritrea (HRCE). In the 2000s, Chyrum was campaigned for and helped to release Eritrean refugees in Libya, Malta, Saudi Arabia, many of whom obtained political asylum in Europe, Australia and Canada.

Chyrum campaigned at the United Nations Human Rights Council (UNHRC) for attention to be paid to human rights violations in Eritrea. She played a key role in obtaining the appointment of a United Nations special rapporteur for Eritrea, Sheila B. Keetharuth. Chyrum participated in a UNHRC meeting considering the nomination, talking personally to the diplomats involved in the meeting, providing "first-person testimony". She spoke personally to each of the six Eritreans present at the meeting.

In March 2014, Chyrum started a hunger strike in Geneva in front of the permanent mission for Djibouti, on behalf of 267 Eritrean refugees detained in Djibouti. She stated that the refugees were being treated as criminals and were not provided with adequate medical care. Chyrum argued that under the Geneva Conventions, the 1967 Protocol Relating to the Status of Refugees and the African Charter on Human and Peoples' Rights, Djibouti was obliged to provide the Eritreans with protection and freedom from persecution.

Chyrum tried to support 220 (or 250) Eritrean refugees in Malta who were threatened with deportation back to Eritrea in 2002. She suggested that they strip naked as a civil disobedience tactic for preventing their deportation. The refugees were deported to Eritrea, and 180 were tortured and interrogated. Chyrum stated that one was held for 55 days in the helicopter position, at temperatures of up to 50 °C (122 °F), after which his skin peeled off and he was held for eight months with one hand and arm tied behind his back. The refugee survived and was studying law in Canada as of 2015, according to Chyrum. Knowledge about the fate of the 2002 refugees led to popular and government support for Eritrean refugees in Malta. In 2015, Chyrum visited Malta and met former Maltese president George Abela and Dionysus Mintoff, a priest, who had also campaigned against the refugees' deportation.

As of 2021, Chyrum remained director of Human Rights Concern Eritrea, which she founded.

== Points of view ==
In 2015, Chyrum attributed the main reasons for Eritreans to seek asylum to government brutality, economic inequality, the 20-year length of military conscription, government spying on ordinary citizens, the poor state of healthcare. She stated, "you can bring yourself to understand why people would rather die at sea, or as they cross the Sahara Desert, than continue to live in that situation."

Chyrum stated in 2015 that it was difficult to sustain international attention humans violations in Eritrea.

== Awards ==
The Eritrean Community For Human Rights and Refugee Protection gave Chyrum a Distinguished Medal Award of Excellence on 20 June 2009 for her "human rights crusade, in general, and her tireless work with refugees, in particular". Asmarino Independent Media designated Chyrum as "woman of the year" for 2012 for her contributions to Eritrean human rights.
