= Yeni yol =

Yeni yol may refer to:

- Yeni yol, Azerbaijan, a municipality

== See also ==
- Yeniyol (disambiguation)
