= Qərsələ =

- Location within Azerbaijan
- Coordinates: 40°47′N 48°17′E
- Country: Azerbaijan
- Rayon: Ismailli
- Municipality: Birinci Yeniyol
- Time zone: UTC+4 (AZT)
  - Summer (DST): UTC+5 (AZT)

Qərsələ (also, Garsele and Gersala) is a village in the Ismailli Rayon of Azerbaijan. The village forms part of the municipality of Birinci Yeniyol.
