= Human Rights Concern Eritrea =

UK-based Eritrean human rights organisation

- Abbreviation: HRCE
- Types: human rights group
- Country: United Kingdom
- Directors: Elsa Chyrum
- Website: hrc-eritrea.org

Human Right Concern Eritrea, also known as Human Rights Concern–Eritrea (HRCE or HRC–E), is an Eritrean human rights organisation based in the United Kingdom and founded by Elsa Chyrum.

== Creation ==
Elsa Chyrum founded Human Right Concern Eritrea in 2009 or earlier.

== Leadership ==
As of 2021, Chyrum remains the director of HRCE.

== Actions ==
HRCE has been used as a source by the British Home Office since 2013 for its 2011 documentation of miners' work conditions in Eritrea and the situations of Eritrean refugees in Libya during the 2011 Libyan civil war. In 2015, Chyrum, as director of HRCE, stated that British authorities had started refusing political asylum to Eritrean refugees on the grounds that they were insufficiently politically active in Eritrea to be at risk of persecution in Eritrea.

In 2013, HRCE provided a submission to the 18th session of the United Nations Human Rights Council's Universal Periodic Review (UPR) mechanism. It its submission, HRCE stated that national elections had been permanently postponed, the parliament closed, the judiciary was not independent, independent civil society organisations were banned and there was no right for peaceful protest. HRCE said that there was no press freedom, there was repression for religious activities, military conscription duration was typically 17 years and female military conscripts were "sexually, emotionally and physically abused", and there were "tens of thousands" of forced disappearances. HRCE reported the wide and systematic use of torture in Eritrea, standing orders of a shoot-to-kill policy at borders, and the use of child labour and child soldiers. HRCE described there being "rampant poverty" in Eritrea, specifying that there was a tightly controlled coupon-based food distribution system for residents of towns, allowing a 100 grams (3.5 oz) piece of bread per person per day, and 750 grams (26 oz) of sugar and 5 kilograms (11 lb) of grain per month per person. Obtaining food outside of the rationing system was criminalised. HRCE stated that the "army [was] malnourished".

HRCE stated that two senior Eritrean Defence Forces (EDF) personnel entered the Shimelba refugee camp in the Tigray Region in November 2020 during the Tigray War. The EDF shot eight Tigrayans suspected of being members of the Tigray People's Liberation Front (TPLF) in order to frighten the rest of the Eritrean refugees. They also shot four Eritrean refugees, Masi Nati Kalifa, Moli Shiri Badumme, Dumam Adanno Agaro, and Aroda Mantay, one who survived long enough to report the killing to the other refugees. According to HRCE, "all" the remaining refugees were then transported by truck back to Eritrea against their will.

HRCE stated that ten Eritrean refugees at the Hitsats refugee camp were shot dead and forty wounded on 23 November 2020. A few days later, the wounded refugees were taken to Eritrea. On 5 January 2021, all the remaining refugees were forced to walk to Sheraro, which they did in two to three days. They were then deported on trucks to Eritrea.
