= Birinci Yeniyol =

- Municipality
- Location within Azerbaijan
- Coordinates: 40°45′N 48°16′E
- Country: Azerbaijan
- Rayon: Ismailli

Population
  - Total: 553
- Time zone: UTC+4 (AZT)
  - Summer (DST): UTC+5 (AZT)

Birinci Yeniyol (also called Yeniyël Pervoye) is a village and municipality in the Ismailli Rayon of Azerbaijan. It has a population of 553. The municipality consists of the villages of Birinci Yeniyol, İkinci Yeniyol, and Qərsələ.
