= Təklə, Kurdamir =

Təklə
- Municipality
- Location within Azerbaijan
- Coordinates: 40°27′23″N 48°10′22″E
- Country: Azerbaijan
- Rayon: Kurdamir
- Time zone: UTC+4 (AZT)
  - Summer (DST): UTC+5 (AZT)

Təklə (also, Təkla, Tegle, and Teklya) is a village and municipality in the Kurdamir Rayon of Azerbaijan.
