= Yeni yol, Azerbaijan =

Coordinates: 40.5075°N 46.8782°E

Yeni yol is a village and municipality in the Goranboy Rayon of Azerbaijan. It has a population of 1,491. The municipality consists of the villages of Yeni yol and Təhlə.
