= Təklə, Jalilabad =

Təklə
- Municipality
- Location within Azerbaijan
- Coordinates: 39°15′32″N 48°20′46″E
- Country: Azerbaijan
- Rayon: Jalilabad

Population
  - Total: 781
- Time zone: UTC+4 (AZT)
  - Summer (DST): UTC+5 (AZT)

Təklə (also, Teklya) is a village and municipality in the Jalilabad Rayon of Azerbaijan. It has a population of 859.
