= Refoulement of Eritrean refugees during the Tigray war =

Conflict in North Africa

The refoulement of Eritrean refugees consists of the forceful return of Eritrean refugees from Ethiopia back to Eritrea, while international law requires non-refoulement. The New York Times, Europe External Programme with Africa and Human Rights Concern Eritrea claimed that Eritrean refugees were forcefully returned to Eritrea during the Tigray War that started in late November 2020 from the Hitsats and Shimelba refugee camps. On 2 February 2021, there were 20,000 unaccounted for Eritrean refugees according to the United Nations High Commissioner for Refugees following a visit to Ethiopia.

== November 2020 ==
The New York Times stated that after Eritrean Defence Forces (EDF) arrived in the Hitsats refugee camp in the Tigray Region on 19 November 2020 during the Tigray War, in addition to carrying out beatings and extrajudicial executions, the EDF forcefully took 40 Eritrean refugees back into Eritrea.

Human Rights Concern Eritrea stated that the EDF had initially frightened the Eritrean refugees by shooting eight suspected TPLF members in full view, and later shooting four refugees. HRCE stated that "all" the remaining refugees were transported by truck back to Eritrea against their will.

== January 2021 ==
HRCE stated that all the refugees remaining in the Hitsats camp were forced to walk to Sheraro starting 5 January 2021, which they did in two to three days. They were then deported on trucks to Eritrea. On 10 January 2021, Europe External Programme with Africa (EEPA) stated that refugees from Hitsats had been forced to return to Eritrea. EEPA also described the Shimelba refugee camp as "completely deserted" and said that refugees from the camp, especially young men, had been returned to Eritrea.

== February 2021 ==
Al Jazeera English (AJE) stated on 1 February that hundreds of refugees from Hitsats had arrived at Mai Aini, another refugee camp in the Tigray Region. A witness told AFP that 26 or 27 refugees were taken by the EDF to an unknown location. On 2 February, Filippo Grandi, the United Nations High Commissioner for Refugees (UNHCR), stated after a visit to Ethiopia that Eritrean refugees had been "caught in crossfire, abducted and forced to return to Eritrea under duress by Eritrean forces". The UN had access to the Mai Aini camp. The official UN estimate of the number of unaccounted for refugees was 20,000. As of 1 February 2021, neither the UNHRC nor the Ethiopian Agency for Refugee and Returnee Affairs had access to the Hitsats and Shimelba camps.

== See also ==
- Deportation of Eritreans during the war in Sudan (2023)
- Refugee kidnappings in Sinai
