= Zoa Peak =

Mountain in British Columbia, Canada

Coordinates: 49°37′45″N 121°5′9″W

Zoa Peak 1872 m (6142 ft) is a mountain peak adjacent to the Coquihalla River in British Columbia, Canada. There is a trail that starts from the same location of the Falls Lake trail.

The name is one of a group of names in this area known as the Llamoid Group or Asian Group among climbers. A "zoa" is the progeny of a cattle bull and a nak (a female yak).

== Peak panorama ==
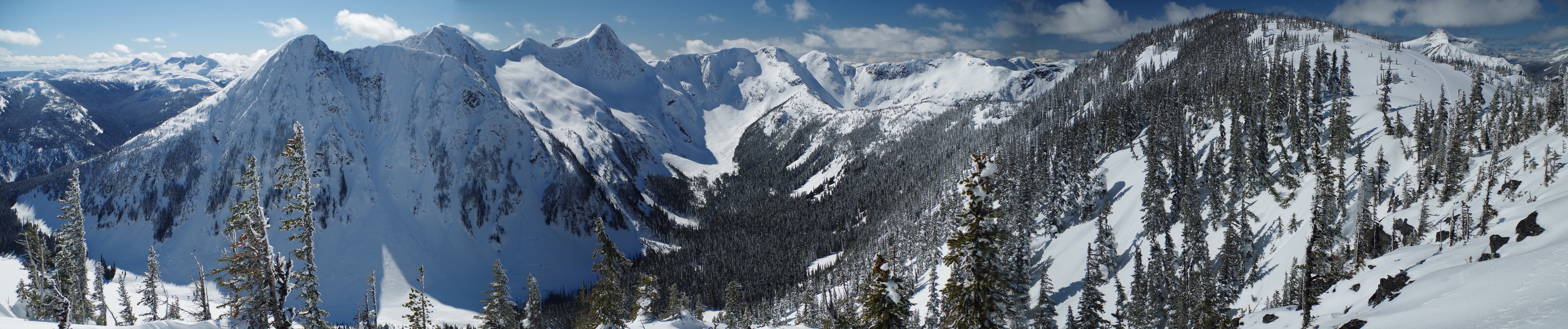
Zoa Peak on the right
