= Təhlə, Goranboy =

Village in Goranboy, Azerbaijan

Coordinates: 40.5075°N 46.8782°E

Təhlə is a village in the municipality of Yeni yol in the Goranboy Rayon of Azerbaijan.
