= Təhlə, Barda =

Təhlə
- Municipality
- Location within Azerbaijan Location within Karabakh Economic Region
- Coordinates: 40°16′N 47°13′E
- Country: Azerbaijan
- Rayon: Barda

Population
  - Total: 140
- Time zone: UTC+4 (AZT)
  - Summer (DST): UTC+5 (AZT)

Təhlə (also, Taklya) is a village and municipality in the Barda Rayon of Azerbaijan. It has a population of 140.
