= Təklə, Masally =

Təklə
- Municipality
- Location within Azerbaijan
- Coordinates: 39°07′41″N 48°40′08″E
- Country: Azerbaijan
- Rayon: Masally

Population
  - Total: 1,623
- Time zone: UTC+4 (AZT)
  - Summer (DST): UTC+5 (AZT)

Təklə (also, Taklya and Teklya) is a village and municipality in the Masally Rayon of Azerbaijan. It has a population of 1,623.
