= Təklə Mirzəbaba =

- Municipality
- Location within Azerbaijan
- Coordinates: 40°37′38″N 48°47′09″E
- Country: Azerbaijan
- Rayon: Gobustan

Population
  - Total: 2,038
- Time zone: UTC+4 (AZT)
  - Summer (DST): UTC+5 (AZT)

Təklə Mirzəbaba (also, Teklya Mirzababa) is a village and municipality in the Gobustan Rayon of Azerbaijan. According to the 2009 census, it has a population of 2,038.
