= Tekle Giyorgis =

Tekle Giyorgis may refer to

- Tekle Giyorgis I (c. 1751–1817), Emperor of Ethiopia
- Tekle Giyorgis II (died 1873), Emperor of Ethiopia
