= Məmmədrza Dizə =

- Municipality
- Location within Azerbaijan
- Coordinates: 39°17′14″N 45°27′34″E
- Country: Azerbaijan
- Autonomous republic: Nakhchivan
- District: Babek

Population (2005)
  - Total: 494
- Time zone: UTC+4 (AZT)

Məmmədrza Dizə (also, Mammadrza Diza, Memmedrza Dize, until 2003, Yeniyol and Yeniyël) is a village and municipality in the Babek District of Nakhchivan, Azerbaijan. It is located 14 km in the north from the district center, on the foothill area. Its population is busy with grain-growing, vegetable-growing, poultry and animal husbandry. There are secondary school, club, library, mosque and a medical center in the village. It has a population of 494.

== Etymology ==
The settlement of Yeniyol (New road) was built in the years of the Soviet rule and as a symbol it was named like this. Since 2003, the name of the village was officially registered as Məmmədrza Dizə which was existed in this territory in the past. The name was made up from the components of Məmmədrza (Məmmədrza is the person name) and Dizə (the old term of Iranian origin, means as "village", "castle", "fortified") means "a village belonging to Mammadrza".
