= Təklə, Agsu =

Village in Agsu Rayon, Azerbaijan

Təklə is a village and municipality in the Agsu Rayon of Azerbaijan. It has a population of 434.
