= Conscription in Eritrea =

Conscription in Eritrea requires every able bodied man and woman to serve, ostensibly, for 18 months. In this time, they receive six months of military training and the rest of their time is spent working on national reconstruction projects. This program allegedly aims to compensate for Eritrea's lack of capital and to reduce dependence on foreign aid. This is outlined in both the Constitution of Eritrea, as well as Proclamation 82 issued by the National Assembly in October 1995. However, the period of enrollment may be extended during times of national crisis, and in practice, the typical period of national service is considerably longer than the minimum. Since the 1990s, conscription has been effectively open-ended; this draft policy has been likened to "slavery" and has earned international condemnation.

== Overview ==
According to a US State Department information sheet from October 2007, Eritrean national service consists of "approximately six months of military training, followed by a number of years in military or other government service." Besides national defense, conscripts also spend peacetime working on public construction projects. They get paid no more than $30 a month. There is no term limit for national service, having been made open-ended in 1998. Although the average term lasts about six years, there are cases of soldiers who reported being forced to serve for more than a decade. The large number of troops has also had some effect on the Eritrean economy.

=== Human rights abuses ===
Reportedly, many conscripts live in terrible conditions, and are essentially used for slave labor, subjected to severe physical punishments for trying to escape, and are at the mercy of their commanders. There is no right to conscientious objection to military service, and those who refuse the draft are imprisoned. Some Jehovah's Witness conscientious objectors have been in jail since 1994. Those requesting to leave have also been met with detainment, and sometimes torture. There were many cases of female conscripts being sexually abused. As a result, they suffer from morale problems, and some Eritreans even leave the country to dodge the draft. By 2017, the numbers of Eritreans fleeing the draft to other countries is reported to have reached the thousands.

Many Eritrean draft dodgers fled to Europe and Israel since the beginning of the European migrant crisis of 2015. The same year, a UN report documented extensive human rights abuses within the Eritrean Army, and stated:

Indeed, the indefinite duration of national service, its terrible conditions — including arbitrary detention, torture, sexual torture, forced labour, absence of leave and the ludicrous pay — and the implications it has for the possibility of any individual to found a family, conduct a family life and have favourable conditions of work make national service an institution where slavery-like practices are routine.

The Eritrean government under Isaias Afwerki claimed that the duration of national service was necessary due to the continued hostilities with, and illegal occupation of Eritrean territory by, Ethiopia. However, when the border conflict with Ethiopia was resolved in 2018, this policy did not change, and Eritrea did not respond to questions from Human Rights Watch when asked why this was the case.

=== Tigray War ===
Beginning in mid-2022, and escalating after mobilization in September that same year, Eritrea engaged in a mass conscription campaign for the Tigray War. Human Rights Watch reported that families of those who wished to avoid the draft became targets of collective punishment, with government authorities subjecting them to arbitrary detention and forced evictions from their homes.

== See also ==
- 2013 Eritrean Army mutiny
- Refoulement of Eritrean refugees during the Tigray War
- Deportation of Eritreans during the war in Sudan (2023)
- SAWA Defence Training Center
