= Tekle Kiflay =

Eritrean general

Brigadier General Tekle Kiflay is the current commander of Operation Zone One in Eritrea. The country has five operation zones, each headed by a high-ranking military official. These zones overlap the six administrative regions. The power of the Operation Zone commanders supersedes that of administrators. He was accused by the UN Monitoring Group on Somalia and Eritrea in 2011 of human and arms trafficking during his time as Commander of the western military operations zone.
