= Yeniyol, Agdam =

Yeniyol
- Village
- Location within Azerbaijan
- Coordinates: 40°05′36″N 46°57′15″E
- Country: Azerbaijan
- Rayon: Agdam
- Time zone: UTC+4 (AZT)
  - Summer (DST): UTC+5 (AZT)

Yeniyol is a village in the Agdam Rayon of Azerbaijan.
