= Hitsats massacre =

Massacre as part of the Tigray War in 2020

- Part of the Tigray War
- Location: Hitsats refugee camp, Tigray Region, Ethiopia
- Date: 19 November 2020
- Target: Eritrean refugees
- Attack type: Massacre
- Deaths: 300
- Perpetrators: (Eritrea) Eritrean Defence Forces (Tigray Region) Tigrayan militias

The Hitsats massacre was a massacre at Hitsats refugee camp on or around 19 November 2020 during the Tigray War. The civilians killed were 300 Eritrean refugees, according to Europe External Programme with Africa (EEPA), and five humanitarian workers, according to The New York Times, Associated Press, and the United Nations Office for the Coordination of Humanitarian Affairs.

== Massacre ==
Eritrean Defence Force (EDF) soldiers arrived in Hitsats refugee camp on 19 November 2020. According to The New York Times (NYT), 40 people were killed in the initial battle between the EDF and local Tigrayan militias, including four civilians.

== Civilian deaths ==
=== Eritrean refugees ===
According to a 10 January 2021 Europe External Programme with Africa (EEPA) report, Ethiopian TV stated that 300 Hitsats refugees had been extrajudicially executed by the Tigray People's Liberation Front (TPLF). An anonymous source quoted by EEPA disagreed, attributing the executions to the EDF, stating, "Eritrean forces massively killed their own citizens in Hitsats refugee camp to punish them for escaping their shoot to kill policy.

Refugees interviewed by Agence France Presse (AFP) stated that pro-TPLF forces used Hitsats as a base for several weeks in November 2020, killing several refugees who wanted to leave the camp to get food, and in one incident, killed nine young Eritrean men in revenge for having lost a battle against the EDF.

Witnesses say that Eritrean soldiers swept through Hitsats camp, and killed, beat, raped and kidnapped refugees. Many people were taken, and those that tried to escape were shot.

=== Humanitarian workers ===
The four civilians killed in the initial battle, according to the NYT and Associated Press, were one Ethiopian employee of the International Rescue Committee and three Ethiopian civilian guards employed by the Danish Refugee Council.

A fifth refugee worker, a 52-year old employed by the Dutch non-governmental organisation ZOA International, was reported in late December 2020 to have been killed at Hitsats refugee camp.

In early January 2021, the United Nations Office for the Coordination of Humanitarian Affairs (UNOCHA) called for "the unrestricted and safe passage of humanitarian personnel and supplies to all parts of Tigray Region".

== Property destruction ==
Satellite images confirmed the presence of burned fields and forests. Analyses of satellite images by Planet Labs Inc and DX Open Network showed that on 5 January 2021, there were "at least 14 actively burning structures and 55 others [had been] damaged or destroyed", and that on 8 January there were new fires.
