= Tewelde =

Tewelde is a name. Notable people with the name include:

- Tewelde Estifanos (born 1981), Eritrean long-distance runner
- Tewelde Goitom, Eritrean human trafficker
- Faniel Tewelde (born 2006), Norwegian footballer
- Hiskel Tewelde (born 1986), Eritrean long-distance runner
- Rahel Tewelde (born 1974), Eritrean filmmaker
- Tesfu Tewelde (born 1997), Eritrean long-distance runner
- Tsegai Tewelde (born 1989), Eritrean-born British distance runner
