= Sound of Torture =

2013 documentary film

- Film poster
- Directed by: Keren Shayo
- Written by: Keren Shayo
- Produced by: Osnat Trabelsi, Galit Cahlon
- Cinematography: Daniel Kedem
- Edited by: Ayal Goldberg
- Music by: Yosef Babliki
- Production company: Trabelsi Productions
- Distributed by: First Hand Films (Israel), Women Make Movies (USA)
- Release date: November 21, 2013
- Running time: 60 minutes
- Countries: Israel, Egypt, Sweden
- Languages: Hebrew, Tigrinya, Arabic Subtitles in English

Sound of Torture is a 2013 documentary film written and directed by Israeli filmmaker Keren Shayo which follows Eritrean radio host and human rights activist Meron Estefanos as she reports on Eritrean refugees who have been captured in Sudan while migrating across the Sinai Peninsula into Israel.

== Synopsis ==
The film Sound of Torture chronicles Meron Estefanos’ journey with the families of those who have been kidnapped, tortured, and raped by Bedouin smugglers in the Sinai Desert. Those held captive are brought to torture camps and given cell phones to call their families and beg for ransom for their release. The amount of ransom money demanded by the traffickers ranges from $15,000-$40,000 American dollars. Estefanos broadcasts her weekly radio program “Voices of Eritrean Refugees” out of her home in Stockholm, Sweden where she dedicates the show to reporting on the refugee kidnappings in Sinai. During the broadcast she reads the names of recently kidnapped victims and gives updates and advice to Eritrean listeners. The film shows Estefanos’ attempts to communicate with hostages and the kidnappers as she then airs their phone conversations during her broadcasts so the audience can bear witness the torture being inflicted. Sound of Torture follows two specific cases which takes Estafanos to Sinai where she witnesses first-hand the stories of those who have been tortured and to Tel Aviv where she finally meets the Sudanese refugees who she has kept in contact with.

== Production ==
Keren Shayo chose to make this film due to the lack of media coverage and political discussion on this topic. Shayo's main goal for this film was to raise global awareness surrounding the situations Eritreans undergo when attempting to seek asylum. Shayo's previous work with migrants and refugees brought together her and Estafanos to create Sound of Torture.

== Background ==
About 3,000 Eritreans a month flee the dictatorship of Isaias Afwerki and the one-party state of Eritrea where indefinite military service and forced labor is required of all Eritreans from the age of 18 to 55. Eritrea is considered one of the most surveilled countries in the world with no independent media and no public internet service. Afwerki has been the country's only president since Eritrea gained its independence from Ethiopian rule in 1991. The United Nations has described the kidnappings and human trafficking in Sinai as one of the most under-reported humanitarian crises in the world while the government of Eritrea's human rights record is considered among the worst in the world. After Europe closed its borders in 2006, the only option for Eritreans fleeing their country towards Israel is across the Sinai desert in Egypt. Critics explain that those fleeing Eritrea are looking for better opportunities in Israel away from their repressive government, conditions of poverty, and prolonged incarceration and military service. It has been reported that people of the Rashaida Tribe, Eritreans, and Sudanese soldiers are all involved in the trafficking of Eritreans to Israel. Many Eritreans pay traffickers to transport them to the Israeli border but are instead held hostage by those they paid and sold to gangs in Sinai where they are tortured and held for ransom. These strategically organized kidnapping are known as the refugee kidnappings in Sinai.

== Festival screenings ==
- Israel Film Festival (Los Angeles)
- International Documentary Film Festival Amsterdam
- Gothenburg Film Festival (Sweden)
- One World (Prague)
- International Film Festival and Forum on Human Rights (Geneva)
- Movies that Matter (Netherlands)
- Docaviv (Telaviv)
- Mexico International Film Festival
- Sguardi Altrove Film Festival (Italy)
- Münchn Komitee Human Rights Watch (Germany)
- Bergen International Film Festival (Norway)
- Mediteran Film Festival (Bosnia)
- Prix Europa (Berlin)
- Verzio International Human Rights Documentary Film Festival (Budapest)
- Amnesty International Documentary Film Festival (Hong Kong)
- Warsaw Jewish Film Festival (Poland)
- UK Jewish Film Festival (London)
- International Documentary and Short Film Festival of Kerala (India)

== Broadcasts ==
- 2015: PBS Broadcast
- 2014: Arte (Franco-German TV)
- 2014: Al Jazeera Witness
- 2014: Israeli TV Premier yes doco
- 2014: VARA TV Nederland 1
- 2014: Schweizer Radio und Fernsehen
- 2013: This American Life

== Accolades ==
- 2014: Best Short Documentary Film at the Ophir Awards
- 2014: Best Debut Film at the Docaviv Film Festival
- 2014: Special Mention Award at the International Film Festival and Forum on Human Rights
- 2014: VARA Audience Award at the Movies that Matter Festival
- 2014: Best Intercultural TV Programme at Prix Europa
