= Tewelde Goitom =

Eritrean human trafficker (born c. 1984)

Tewelde Goitom, or Walid or Welid, (born c. 1984) is an Eritrean human trafficker and smuggler.

Between 2014 and 2018, he was "at the heart of a particularly brutal and lucrative trade in desperate migrants trying to reach Europe" and boasted that he moved "15,000 people across the sea to Europe in 2015 alone".

He was arrested in March 2020, tried and in 2021 found guilty and sentencted to 18 years in prison in Ethiopia. Eritrean journalist Meron Estefanos predicted that he would be able to bribe his guards and escape like ringleader Kidane Zekarias Habtemariam, who had escaped detention in mid-February 2021.

In 2022, Ethiopia extradited Tewelde Goitom to the Netherlands and on January 10, 2023, he appeared at a pretrial hearing in the Dutch town of Zwolle, where he claimed he was a victim of mistaken identity. The prosecution wanted to join his case with that of Kidane Zekarias Habtemariam, who had been arrested again January 1, 2023 in Khartoum, Sudan.

Goitom's trial began on 3 November 2025. On 27 January 2026, the Overijssel District Court handed down the maximum sentence of 20 years' jail due to both the nature and scale of the crimes; victims mentioned "a litany of abuses, including torture, starvation, and sexual violence, painting a chilling picture of daily life within these detention sites".

== See also ==
- Refugee kidnappings in Sinai
- Bani Walid detention camp
