= Meron Estefanos =

Eritrean-Swedish journalist and activist

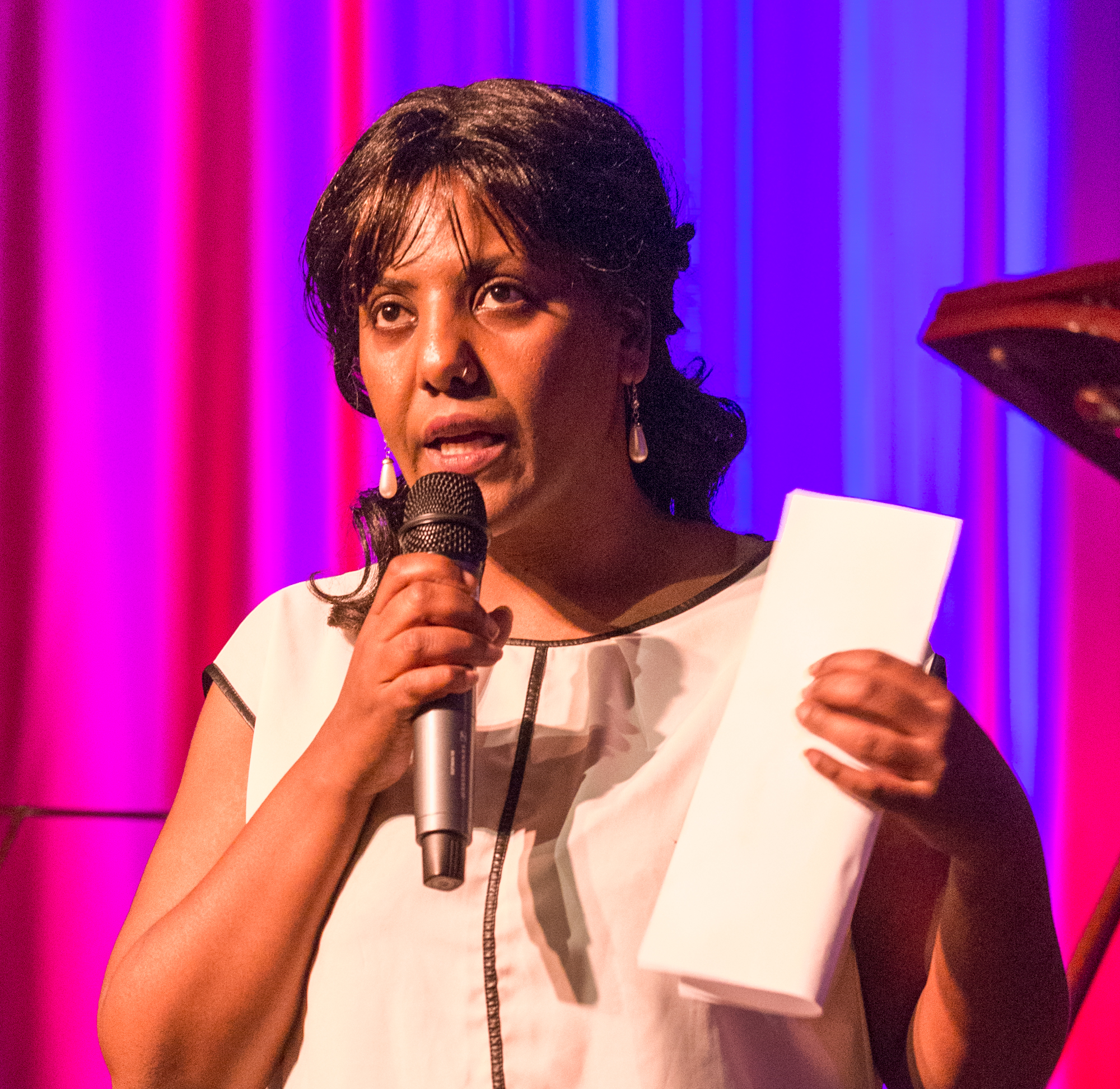
- Estefanos in 2014
- Born: 6 January 1975 (age 51); Ethiopia
- Occupations: Journalist; human rights activist
- Children: 2

Meron Estefanos (born 6 January 1975) is a Swedish-Eritrean human rights activist and journalist. She first became known in the Eritrean refugee community in 2011 for helping people who had been kidnapped and tortured by human traffickers on their way to Israel in order to extort ransom money from their relatives, exemplified in the 2013 documentary film Sound of Torture. After the migrant and trafficking routes changed to Libya, her efforts continued and uncovered criminal networks reaching into Europe. As of 2022, Estefanos deplored that no traffickers had been brought to justice, with little interest from national governments and international organisations.

== Early life and education ==
Meron Estefanos was born in 1974 in Ethiopia. Her father was a political activist; when he found out he was about to be arrested, he fled to Sudan, and eventually made it to Sweden. She and her mother stayed behind in Eritrea, but in 1987, could leave Eritrea, as her father had found work in Sweden. She calls herself privileged because she acquired the status of Swedish citizenship through her father and could leave on Ethiopian Airlines to Sweden. She grew up in Sweden.

== Career ==
As an adult, Estefanos moved to Eritrea, where she became aware of the privileges of her Swedish citizenship. She then moved back to Sweden to openly oppose the Eritrean government. "For five or six years" she was a political activist, unable to reach people in Ethiopia, unable to effect change, and was not allowed to reenter Eritrea. She decided to focus on refugees, "because [she] could reach them".

Since 2008, she has fielded cellphone calls by refugees. Eventually, she received around 100 calls a day, or if a boat were in distress, up to 500 calls a day. She started her own radio program from her kitchen studio called Voices from Eritrean refugees on the regime-critical radio station Radio Erena.

Between 2009 and 2014 there were large numbers of refugee kidnappings in Sinai. Over time a clearer picture of the criminal networks emerged, a small group of Bedouin bosses in Sinai were at the top, with connections to gangs of kidnappers in Sudan, as well as agents in different cities around the world. In 2011, Estefanos published a report which showed that organ trafficking was part of the trafficking of Sudanese-Eritrean asylum seekers in Egypt, primarily on the Sinai Peninsula. The 2013 documentary film Sound of Torture showed her work helping refugees from Eritrea, who had been kidnapped and tortured on their way to Israel in order to extort ransom money from their relatives. After the 2013 Lampedusa migrant shipwreck disaster she helped people track down missing relatives. In 2015, the Toronto Star estimated that she had helped save 16,000 refugees with her phone.

In February 2020, Estefanos travelled to Addis Ababa, and shortly afterwards Kidane Zekarias Habtemariam, head of the infamous Bani Walid detention camp involved in human trafficking in Libya, was arrested. In October 2020, court proceedings in Addis Ababa began without any foreign observers. Judges did not call local, nor international witnesses. According to the prosecution, there was one Zoom video meeting with Dutch prosecutors, no request for extradition, and that with the start of the COVID-19 pandemic, Europe had not shown interest in the case. In January 2021, he had escaped and later was convicted in absentia for life in prison, but as Estefanos had feared, no middlemen were found and none of the networks interrupted. At that point Estefanos became depressed, also precipitated by lack of income during the pandemic.

In 2022, Süddeutsche Zeitung called her "the lone huntress of human traffickers". As of 2022, Estefanos deplored that no traffickers had been brought to justice, with little interest from national governments and international organisations. "If the victims were white people, yes, then things can happen."

Estefanos has been a regular writer for the exile Eritrean news site Asmarino and been active in the human rights organization Eritrean Movement for Democracy and Human Rights. She co-founded the International Commission on Eritrean Refugees (ICER), in Stockholm.

== Personal life ==
As of 2014, Estefanos was a single mother of two boys, aged thirteen and five.

== Awards and honors ==
- Dawit Isaak Award, 2011 from the National Press Club in recognition for her commitment to imprisoned journalist Dawit Isaak.
- Engel-duTertre Prize from ACAT Foundation, 2015.
