= Asmarino =

Eritrean diaspora news website

Asmarino or Asmarino Independent Media is an Eritrean diaspora news website, established in 1997.

== Creation ==
Asmarino was established in 1997 by Tesfaledet, an Eritrean refugee living in the United States, following a visit to Eritrea during which he was unable to convince officials to adopt his proposals for internet development in the country. By the 2010s, the website was regarded as a major news source for the Eritrean diaspora.

== Points of view ==
The content of Asmarino is generally critical of the Eritrean government, serving as a "counterpart to the Eritrean state".

== Repression ==
In 2011, one of Asmarinos contributors, Meron Estefanos, reported being threatened by Tedros Isaac, who allegedly told her that her throat would be cut if she continued to report on his brother, Dawit Isaac, who at that time had been imprisoned for ten years without charge or trial.
