= South Sinai regional development programme =

South Sinai regional development programme (SSRDP) is an integrated regional development programme in the Governorate of South Sinai, Egypt funded by the European Union. The goal of the programme is to protect cultural and natural resources, and improve the living conditions of the local Bedouin communities.

== History ==
The programme manages grant totalling €54 million.

SSRDP Components

Component I: pre-determined large projects related to infrastructure, studies, and equipment at a total of €34 million. Most of the projects were identified in a large stakeholders conference in Sharm el Sheikh in 2004.

The First Call for Proposals (with a total budget of €19 million) received 835 proposals (requesting €297 million) and was open to NGOs, Government entities, and SMEs (most representative of local communities), and international organizations. Component II included a direct grant of €1 million targeting Bedouin communities. The Direct Grants procedure was intentionally simplified and designed with themes to suit local communities.

The overall purpose of the programme was defined as the development of local economy and activities and the preservation and support of the social, cultural and natural resources of South Sinai: • promotion of local communities (particularly Bedouins) and their social and economic development, • increased support for sustainable tourism development through a more balanced geographical distribution and diversification of activities, as well as the preservation and promotion of the unique cultural heritage of the region and its Bedouin population, • more effective decentralized environmental management and control in Protectorates, municipalities and tourist facilities, • improved delivery of appropriate social and public services to the Governorate’s urban, rural and clustered populations, with increased employment opportunities for local communities and in particular for the under-privileged and women, • strengthening of the decentralization process in decision making, financing and implementation,

The Grant Scheme Programme has two objectives:

1. to maintain and advance the development of local economy through activities respectful of, and consistent with, the need to protect and preserve the sensitive and rich social, cultural and natural resources of South Sinai, particularly in the interest of the Bedouin population; and 2. to stimulate, encourage, promote, and support the interest, drive, initiative, and entrepreneurial spirit of local communities, particularly Bedouin and migrant workers, through their participation in such activities.
