= Makhad Trust =

- Company type: Charity
- Founded: 29 October 2003
- Headquarters: United Kingdom
- Website: www.makhad.org

The Makhad Trust is a UK charity that works to sustain the environment and the natural heritage of peoples living in the nomadic regions of the world. The organisation gained charitable status in 2003 (registered no. 100377).

== Aims ==
The word ‘makhad’ in Arabic means ‘meeting place’. The aim of the Makhad Trust is to provide a meeting place in nomadic regions of the world and to assist nomadic peoples who wish to restore their ancient connection to the land. Working with local entrepreneurs the Makhad Trust helps these peoples in organising projects which promote sustainable living and protect their traditional cultures.

== Work ==
=== Sinai ===
The Makhad Trust operates primarily in the southern Sinai Peninsula in the region of Saint Catherine's Monastery, but also in Tibet and the Arctic Circle. The work of the Trust includes the restoration of the ancient gardens of the Bedouin tribes in the mountains of South Sinai Governorate, as well as the building of small dams that collect water for these gardens. It assists in the construction and restoration of drinking wells in the desert, plus the building of community schools, a medicinal herb school, a craft centre, a computer centre and a Bedouin museum. One of the most important ongoing projects is the restoration of Ain Khudra "Green Spring", an ancient oasis and settlement dating back to before the Exodus of the Hebrew Bible.

=== Tibet ===
In Tibet projects include the restoration of Buddhist prayer walls in the Terton Chogar Gompa and the restoration of murals in the Lukhang Temple near Llasa.

=== Funding ===
This work is funded through charitable donations, through sponsorship of a specific project, by a series of working journeys in the Sinai mountains or retreat journeys in the Sinai desert, and by grants from charitable trusts.

=== Partners ===
The Makhad Trust works in partnership with the Eden Project, Jebeliya NGO (Egypt), the Centre for Himalayan Studies, The Buddhist Association, Lhasa (Tibet), the Waldorf College Project, Ruskin Mill Education Trust, SEKEM (Egypt) and the Isbourne Foundation.
