= Sinai Peninsula =

Peninsula in Egypt

Sinai Peninsula شبه جزيرة سيناء
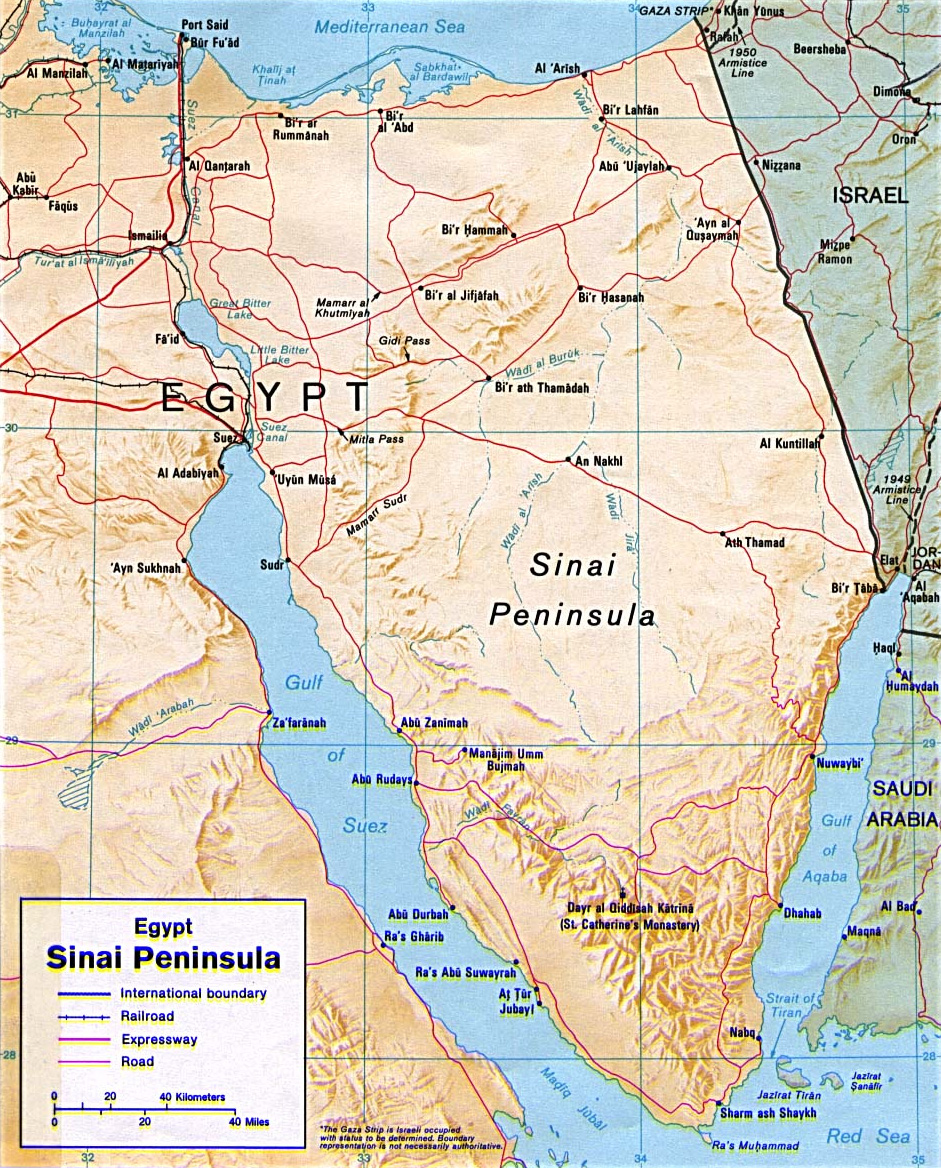
- Shaded relief map of the Sinai Peninsula, 1992, produced by the U.S. Central Intelligence Agency
- Interactive map of Sinai Peninsula شبه جزيرة سيناء

Geography
- Coordinates: 29°30′N 33°48′E
- Area: 60,000 km^{2} (23,000 sq mi)

Administration
- Egypt
- Largest settlement: Arish

Demographics
- Population: 600,000
- Pop. density: 10/km^{2} (30/sq mi)

The Sinai Peninsula, or simply Sinai (/ˈsaɪnaɪ/ SY-ny; Arabic: سيناء, romanized: Seynāʾ or Sīnāʾ; Egyptian Arabic: سينا, romanized: Sīna), is a peninsula in Egypt, and the only part of the country located in West Asia. It is between the Mediterranean Sea to the north and the Red Sea to the south, and is a land bridge between Africa and Asia. Sinai has a land area of about 60,000 km^{2} (23,000 sq mi) (6 percent of Egypt's total area) and a population of approximately 600,000 people. Administratively, the vast majority of the area of the Sinai Peninsula is divided into two governorates: the North Sinai Governorate and the South Sinai Governorate. Three other governorates span the Suez Canal, crossing into African Egypt: Suez Governorate on the southern end of the Suez Canal, Ismailia Governorate in the center, and Port Said Governorate in the north.

In the classical era, the region was known as Arabia Petraea. The peninsula acquired the name Sinai in modern times due to the assumption that a mountain near Saint Catherine's Monastery, named Mount Sinai, is the Biblical Mount Sinai, one of the most religiously significant places in the Abrahamic religions.

The Sinai Peninsula has been a part of Egypt from the First Dynasty of ancient Egypt (c. 3100 BC). This comes in stark contrast to the region north of it, the Levant (the present-day territories of Israel, Jordan, Lebanon, Palestine, and Syria), which, due largely to its strategic geopolitical location and cultural convergences, has historically been the center of conflict between Egypt and various states of Mesopotamia and Asia Minor. In periods of foreign occupation, the Sinai was, like the rest of Egypt, also occupied and controlled by foreign empires, in more recent history the Ottoman Empire (1517–1867) and the United Kingdom (1882–1956). Israel, along with France and the United Kingdom, invaded and occupied Sinai during the Suez Crisis of 1956. Israel invaded the Sinai at the start of the Six-Day War of 1967 due to Egyptian forces massing to invade Israel. On 6 October 1973, Egypt launched the Yom Kippur War, seizing most of the east bank of the Suez Canal while Israel seized even more area to its west. Israel exchanged the ten kilometers along the east bank and territory seized in 1973 for a 1974 ceasefire. In 1982, as a result of the Egypt–Israel peace treaty of 1979, Israel withdrew from all of the Sinai Peninsula except the contentious territory of Taba, which was returned after a ruling by a commission of arbitration in 1989.

Today, Sinai has become a tourist destination due to its natural setting, rich coral reefs, and biblical history.

== Name ==
=== Ancient Egyptian names ===
b i N41 bH xAst
bjꜣw
The Mining Country
in hieroglyphs
Era: Old Kingdom
(2686–2181 BC)

xt x t tyw D12 m f kA D12 niwt
ḫtjw mfkꜣt
The Ladders of Turquoise
in hieroglyphs
Era: Old Kingdom
(2686–2181 BC)

Because the Sinai Peninsula was the main region where mining of turquoise was carried out in Ancient Egypt, it was called Biau (the "Mining Country") and Khetiu Mafkat ("Ladders of Turquoise") by the ancient Egyptians.

=== "Sinai" ===
The origin of the modern name is a source of contention (see Biblical Mount Sinai for a fuller discussion). The name Sinai (Hebrew: סִינַי, Classical Syriac: ܣܝܢܝ) may have been derived from the ancient Mesopotamian moon-god Sin. The moon-deity Sin is associated with the area; the ancient Egyptian moon-god Thoth is also associated with Sin, and his worship was widespread throughout the south tip of the Sinai Peninsula. The Jewish Encyclopedia (1901-1906) quotes a Rabbinic source, the 8th- or 9th-century Pirke De-Rabbi Eliezer, which derives the name from the biblical Hebrew word seneh (Hebrew: סֶ֫נֶּה), a word only known from two occurrences in the Hebrew Bible, in both cases referring to the burning bush. Rabbi Eliezer opines that Mount Horeb only received the name Sinai after God appeared to Moses in the shape of a burning bush.

The English name came from Latin, ultimately from Hebrew סִינַי, [siˈnaj] (see-NIGH, in English phonetic spelling). In English, the name is now usually pronounced /ˈsaɪnaɪ/. An alternative, now dated pronunciation in English was /ˈsaɪniaɪ/ SY-nee-eye.

== Geography ==
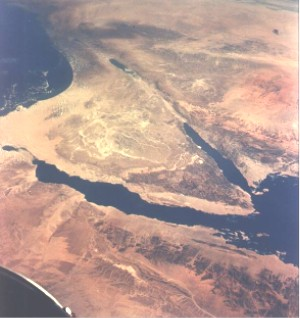
Image from Gemini 11 spacecraft, featuring part of Egypt and the Sinai Peninsula in the foreground and the Levant in the background

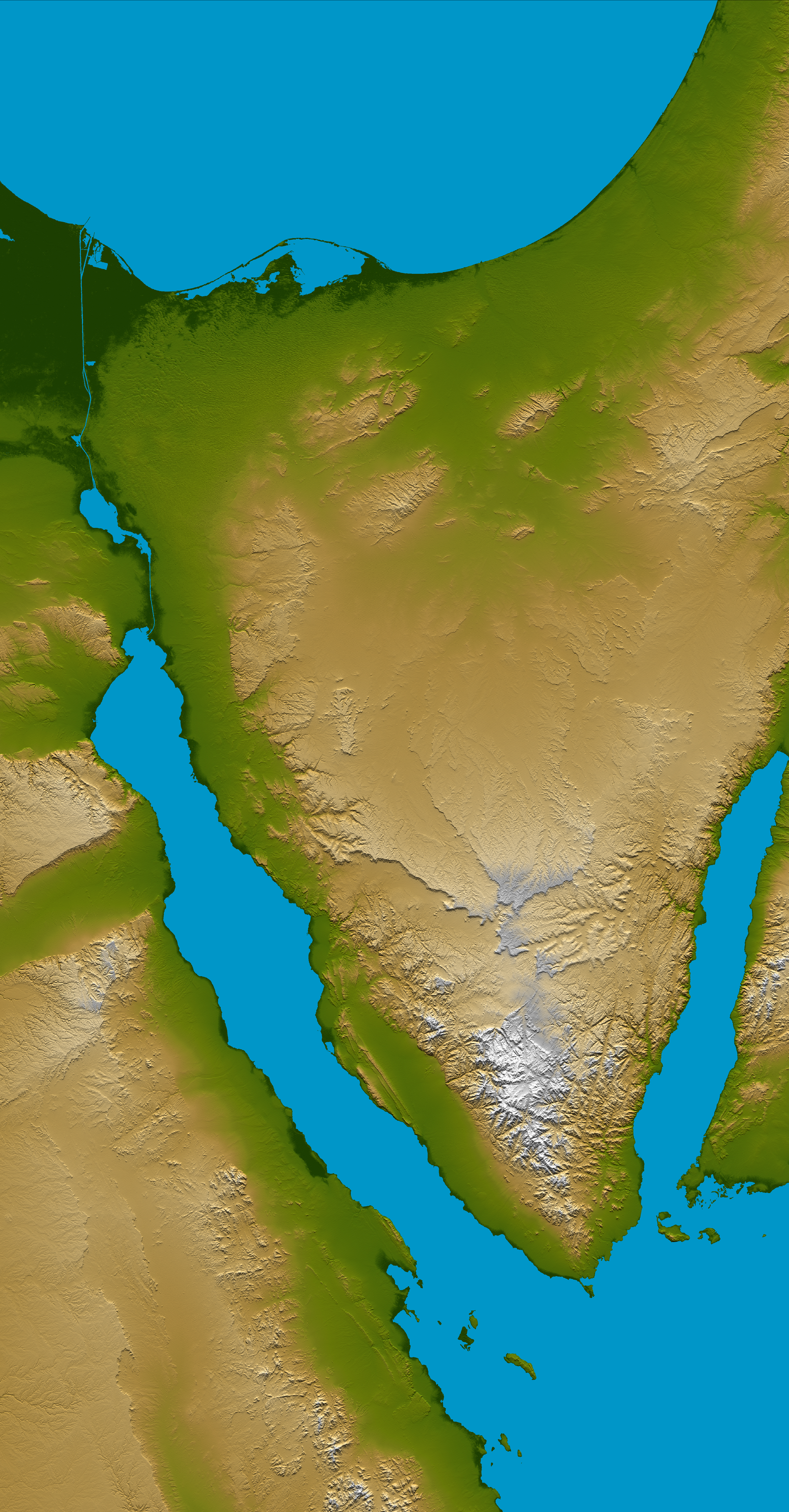
Topographic map of the Sinai Peninsula

Sinai is triangular in shape, with its northern shore lying on the southern Mediterranean Sea, and its southwest and southeast shores on the Gulf of Suez and the Gulf of Aqaba of the Red Sea. It is linked to the African continent by the Isthmus of Suez, 125 kilometres (78 mi) wide strip of land, containing the Suez Canal. The eastern isthmus, linking it to the Asian mainland, is around 200 kilometres (120 mi) wide. The peninsula is on the African Plate with the Arabian Plate on its eastern boundary.

The southernmost tip is the Ras Muhammad National Park.

Most of the Sinai Peninsula is divided among the two governorates of Egypt: South Sinai (Ganub Sina) and North Sinai (Shamal Sina). Together, they comprise around 60,000 square kilometres (23,000 sq mi) and have a population (January 2013) of 597,000. Three more governates span the Suez Canal, crossing into African Egypt: Suez (el-Sewais) is on the southern end of the Suez Canal, Ismailia (el-Isma'ileyyah) in the centre, and Port Said in the north.

The largest city of Sinai is Arish, capital of the North Sinai, with around 160,000 residents. Other larger settlements include Sharm El Sheikh and El-Tor, on the southern coast. Inland Sinai is arid (effectively a desert), mountainous and sparsely populated, the largest settlements being Saint Catherine and Nekhel.

=== Climate ===
Sinai is one of the coldest provinces in Egypt because of its high altitudes and mountainous topographies. Winter temperatures in some of Sinai's cities and towns reach −16 °C (3 °F).

== History ==
=== Chalcolithic ===
A cave with paintings of people and animals was discovered about 30 kilometres (19 mi) north of Mount Catherine in January 2020, dates back to the Chalcolithic Period, c. 5th–4th millennium BCE.

=== Ancient Egypt ===
From the time of the First Dynasty or before, the Egyptians mined turquoise in Sinai at two locations, now called by their Egyptian Arabic names Wadi Maghareh and Serabit el-Khadim. The mines were worked intermittently and on a seasonal basis for thousands of years. Modern attempts to exploit the deposits have been unprofitable. These may be the first historically attested mines.

The fortress Tjaru in western Sinai was a place of banishment for Egyptian criminals. The Way of Horus connected it across northern Sinai with ancient Canaan.

=== Achaemenid Persian Period ===
At the end of the time of Darius I, the Great (521–486 BCE) Sinai was part of the Persian province of Abar-Nahra, which means 'beyond the river [Euphrates]'.

Cambyses successfully managed the crossing of the hostile Sinai Desert, traditionally Egypt's first and strongest line of defence, and brought the Egyptians under Psamtik III, son and successor of Ahmose, to battle at Pelusium. The Egyptians lost and retired to Memphis; the city fell to the Persian control and the Pharaoh was carried off in captivity to Susa in Persia.

=== Roman and Byzantine Periods ===
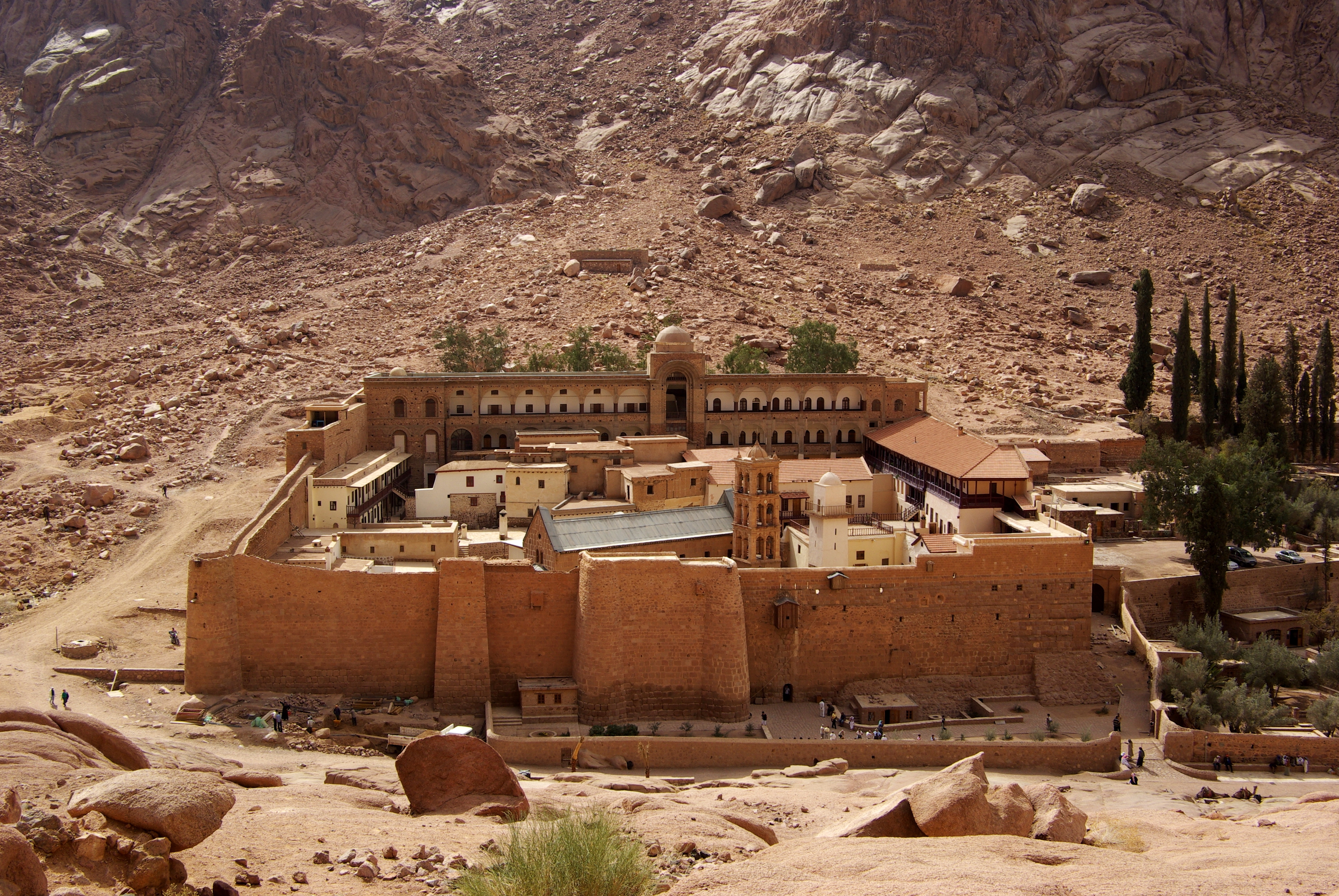
Saint Catherine's Monastery is the oldest working Christian monastery in the world and the most popular tourist attraction on the peninsula.

Rhinocorura (Greek for "Cut-off Noses") and the eponymous region around it were used by Ptolemaid Egypt as a place of banishment for criminals, today known as Arish.

After the death of the last Nabatean king, Rabbel II Soter, in 106, the Roman emperor Trajan faced practically no resistance and conquered the kingdom on 22 March 106. With this conquest, the Roman Empire went on to control all shores of the Mediterranean Sea. The Sinai Peninsula became part of the Roman province of Arabia Petraea.

Saint Catherine's Monastery on the foot of Mount Sinai was constructed by order of the Emperor Justinian between 527 and 565. Most of the Sinai Peninsula became part of the province of Palaestina Salutaris in the 6th century.

=== Ayyubid Period ===
During the Crusades it was under the control of Fatimid Caliphate. Later, Sultan Saladin abolished the Fatimid Caliphate in Egypt and took this region under his control too. It was the military route from Cairo to Damascus during the Crusades. And in order to secure this route, he built a citadel on the island of Pharaoh (near present Taba) known by his name 'Saladin's Citadel'.

=== Mamluk and Ottoman Periods ===
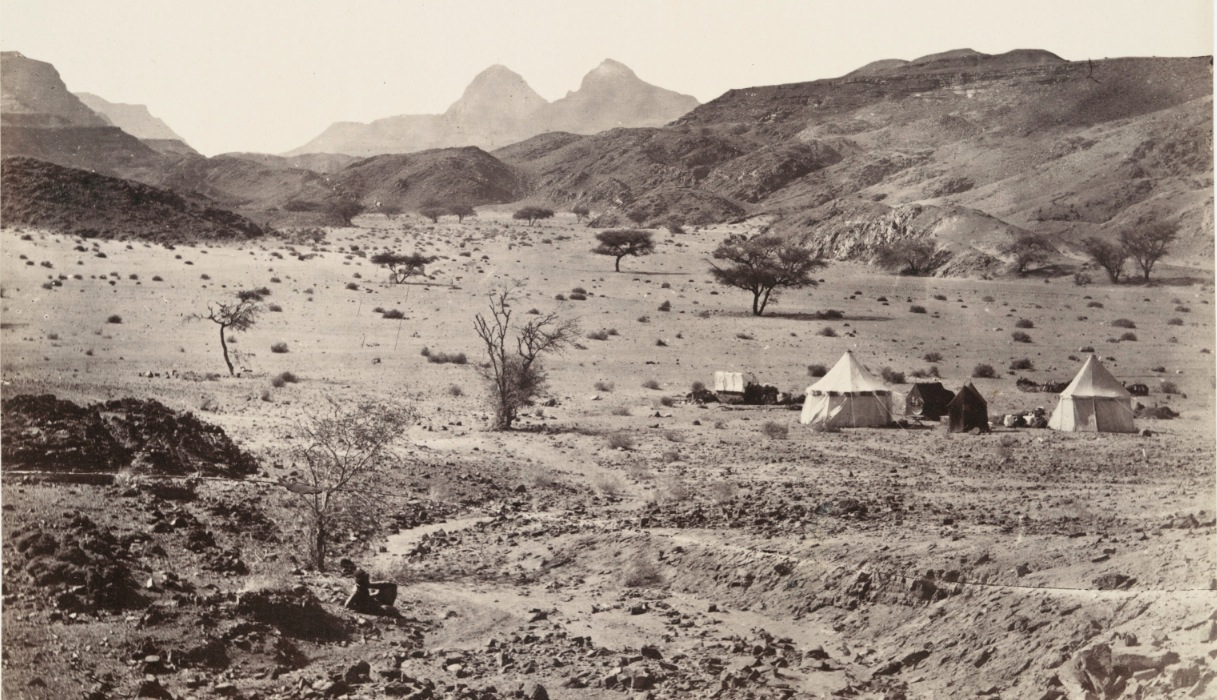
The wilderness of Sinai, 1862

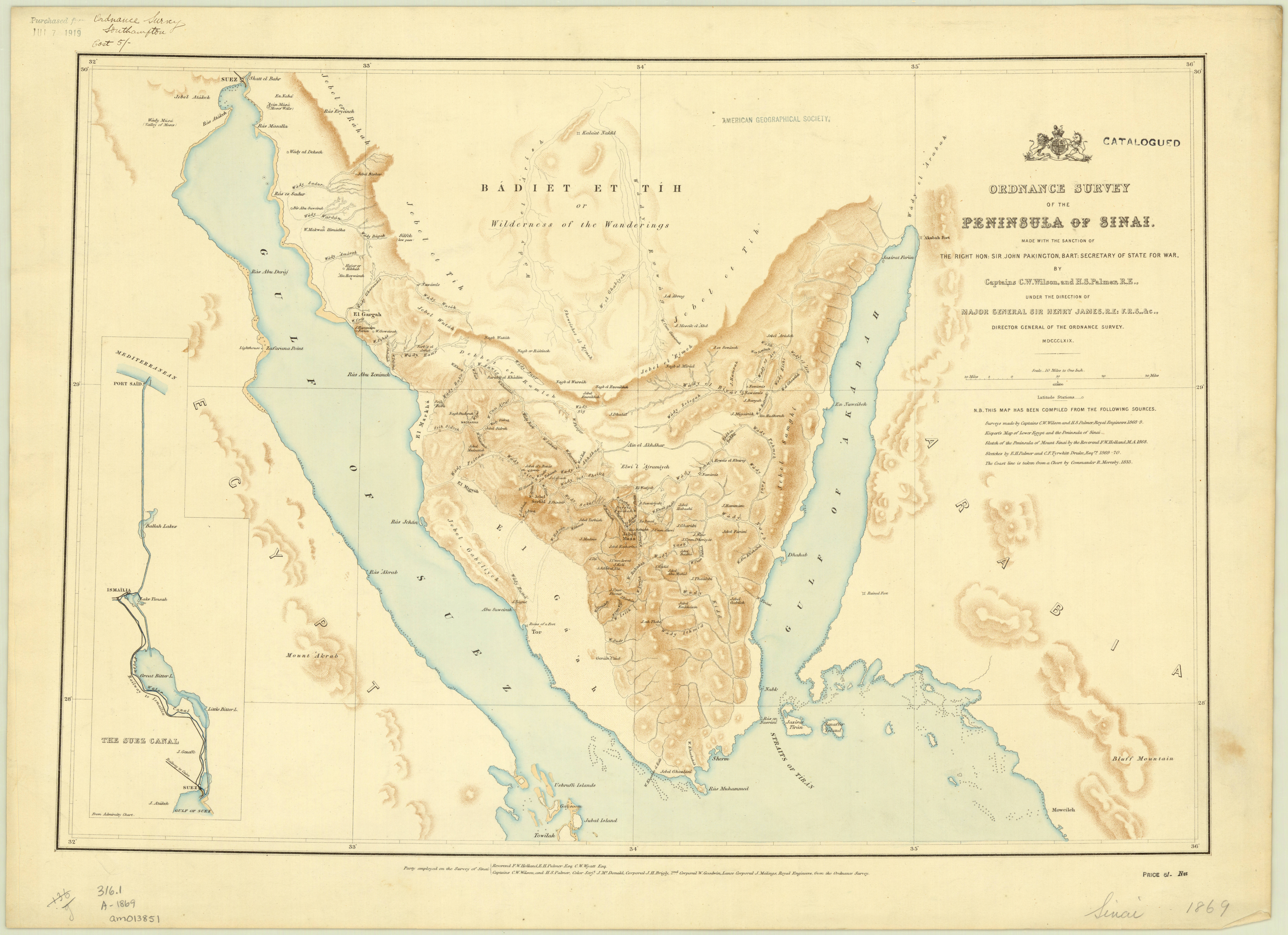
The first scientifically accurate map of the peninsula: the 1869 Ordnance Survey of the Peninsula of Sinai

The peninsula was governed as part of Egypt under the Mamluk Sultanate of Egypt from 1260 until 1517, when the Ottoman Sultan, Selim the Grim, defeated the Egyptians at the Battles of Marj Dabiq and al-Raydaniyya, and incorporated Egypt into the Ottoman Empire. From then until 1906, Sinai was administered by the Ottoman provincial government of the Pashalik of Egypt, even following the establishment of the Muhammad Ali dynasty's rule over the rest of Egypt in 1805.

=== British control ===
In 1906, the Ottoman Porte formally transferred administration of Sinai to the Khedivate of Egypt, which essentially meant that it fell under the control of the British Empire, who had occupied and largely controlled Egypt since the 1882 Anglo-Egyptian War. The border imposed by the British runs in an almost straight line from Rafah on the Mediterranean shore to Taba on the Gulf of Aqaba. This line has served as the de jure eastern border of Egypt ever since.

=== Egyptian-Israeli conflicts ===
==== 1956 war ====
In 1956, Nasserist Egypt nationalised the Suez Canal, a waterway marking the boundary between Egyptian territory in Africa and the Sinai Peninsula. Thereafter, Israeli ships were prohibited from using the Canal, owing to the state of war between the two states. Egypt also prohibited ships from using Egyptian territorial waters on the eastern side of the peninsula to travel to and from Israel, effectively imposing a blockade on the Israeli port of Eilat. In October 1956, in what is known in Egypt as the Tripartite Aggression, Israel Defense Forces troops, aided by the United Kingdom and France (which sought to reverse the nationalization and regain control over the Suez Canal), invaded Sinai and occupied much of the peninsula within a few days. In March 1957, Israel withdrew its forces from Sinai, following strong pressure from the United States and the Soviet Union. Thereafter, the United Nations Emergency Force (UNEF) was stationed in Sinai to prevent any further conflict in the Sinai.

==== 1967 war ====
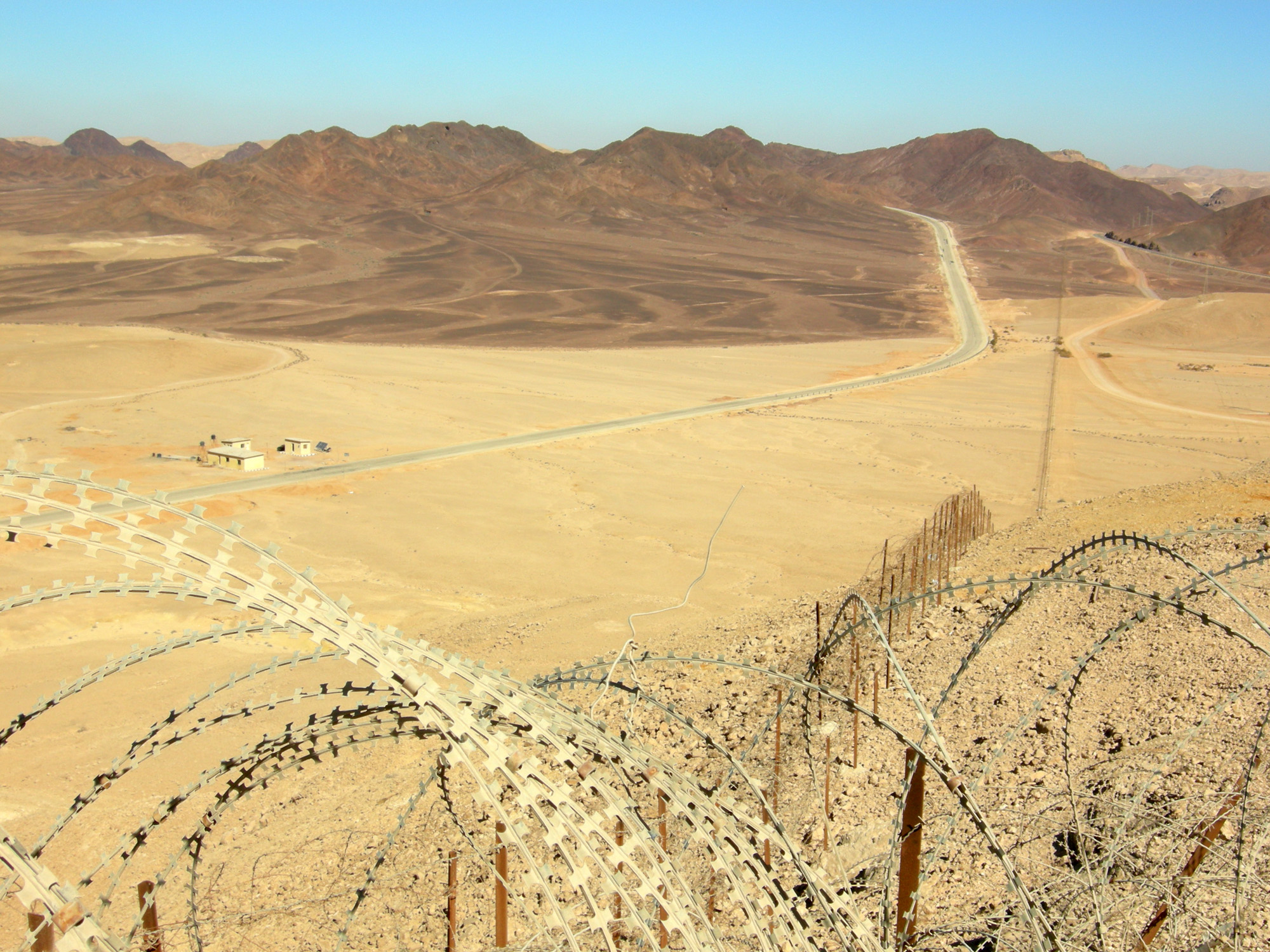
Egypt-Israel border, looking north from the Eilat Mountains (2008)

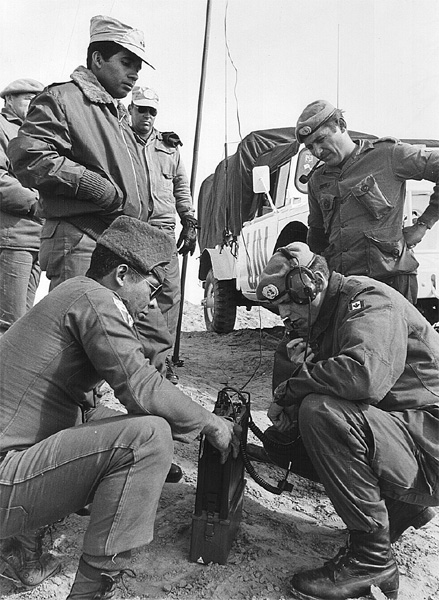
Canadian and Panamanian UNEF UN peacekeepers in Sinai, 1974

On 16 May 1967, Egypt ordered the UNEF out of Sinai and reoccupied it militarily. Secretary-General U Thant eventually complied and ordered the withdrawal without Security Council authorisation. In the course of the Six-Day War that broke out shortly thereafter, Israel occupied the entire Sinai Peninsula, and Gaza Strip from Egypt, the West Bank (including East Jerusalem) from Jordan (which Jordan had controlled since 1949), and the Golan Heights from Syria. The Suez Canal, the east bank of which was now occupied by Israel, was closed. Israel commenced efforts at large scale Israeli settlement in the Sinai Peninsula.

==== War of Attrition ====
Following the Israeli conquest of Sinai, Egypt launched the War of Attrition (1967–70) aimed at forcing Israel to withdraw from the Sinai. The war saw protracted conflict in the Suez Canal Zone, ranging from limited to large-scale combat. Israeli shelling of the cities of Port Said, Ismailia, and Suez on the west bank of the canal, led to high civilian casualties (including the virtual destruction of Suez), and contributed to the flight of 700,000 Egyptian internal refugees. Ultimately, the war concluded in 1970 with no change in the front line.

==== Yom Kippur War ====
On 6 October 1973, the Egyptian Armed Forces commenced Operation Badr to retake the Sinai, while Syria launched a simultaneous operation to retake the Golan Heights, thereby beginning the Yom Kippur War (known in Egypt as the October War). Egyptian engineering forces built pontoon bridges to cross the Suez Canal, and stormed the Bar Lev Line, Israel's defensive line along the Suez Canal's east bank. Though the Egyptians maintained control of most of the east bank of the Suez Canal, in the later stages of the war, the Israeli military crossed the southern section of the Suez Canal, cutting off the Egyptian 3rd Army, and occupied a section of the Suez Canal's west bank. The war ended following a mutually agreed-upon ceasefire. After the war, as part of the subsequent Sinai Disengagement Agreements, Israel withdrew from immediate proximity with the Suez Canal, with Egypt agreeing to permit passage of Israeli ships. The canal was reopened in 1975, with President Anwar Sadat leading the first convoy through the canal aboard an Egyptian Navy destroyer.

==== 1979–1982 Israeli withdrawal ====
In 1979, Egypt and Israel signed a peace treaty in which Israel agreed to withdraw from the entirety of the Sinai Peninsula. Israel subsequently withdrew in several stages, ending in 1982. The Israeli pull-out involved dismantling almost all Israeli settlements, including the settlement of Yamit in north-eastern Sinai. The exception was that the coastal city of Sharm el-Sheikh (which the Israelis had founded as Ofira during their occupation of the Sinai Peninsula) was not dismantled. The Treaty allows monitoring of Sinai by the Multinational Force and Observers, and limits the number of Egyptian military forces in the peninsula.

===== Sinai peacekeeping zones =====
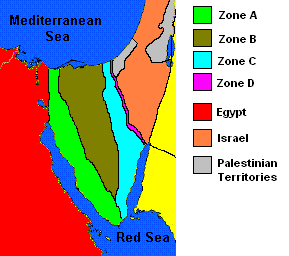
The Sinai Peninsula security zones which delineate Egypt, Israel and Multinational Force and Observers' zone of operations

Article 2 of Annex I of the Peace Treaty called for the Sinai Peninsula to be divided into zones. Within these zones, Egypt and Israel were permitted varying degrees of military buildup:

- Zone A: Between the Suez Canal and Line A. Egypt is permitted a mechanized infantry division with a total of 22,000 troops in Zone A.
- Zone B: Between Line A and Line B. Egypt is permitted four border security battalions to support the civilian police in Zone B.
- Zone C: Between Line B and the Egypt–Israel border. Only the MFO and the Egyptian civilian police are permitted within Zone C.
- Zone D: Between the Egypt–Israel border and Line D. Israel is permitted four infantry battalions in Zone D.

=== Early 21st century security issues ===
Since the early 2000s, Sinai has been the site of several terror attacks against tourists, the majority of whom are Egyptian. Investigations have shown that these were mainly motivated by a resentment of the poverty faced by many Bedouin in the area. Attacking the tourist industry was viewed as a method of damaging the industry so that the government would pay more attention to their situation. (See 2004 Sinai bombings, 2005 Sharm El Sheikh bombings and 2006 Dahab bombings). Since the 2011 Egyptian revolution, unrest has become more prevalent in the area including the August 2012 Sinai attack in which 16 Egyptian soldiers were killed by militants. (See Sinai insurgency.)

Also on the rise are kidnappings of refugees. According to Meron Estifanos, Eritrean refugees are often kidnapped by Bedouin in the northern Sinai, tortured, raped, and only released after paying a large ransom.

Under President el-Sisi, Egypt has implemented a rigorous policy of controlling the border to the Gaza Strip, including the dismantling of tunnels between Gaza and Sinai.

== Demographics ==
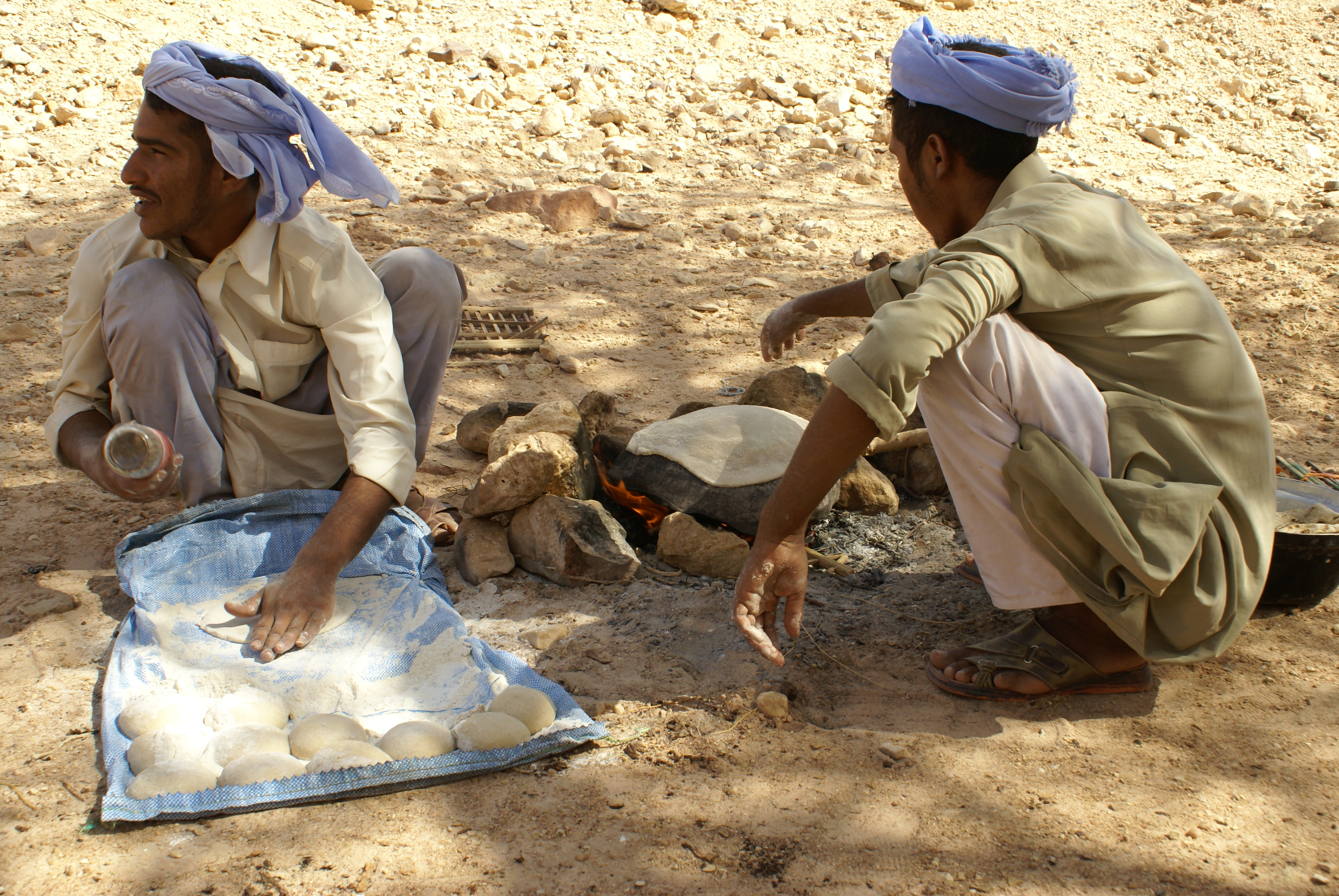
Two young Bedouins making bread in the desert

The two governorates of North Sinai and South Sinai have a total population of 597,000 (January 2013). This figure rises to 1,400,000 by including Western Sinai, the parts of the Port Said, Ismailia and Suez Governorates lying east of the Suez Canal. Port Said alone has a population of roughly 500,000 people (January 2013). Portions of the populations of Ismailia and Suez live in west Sinai, while the rest live on the western side of the Suez Canal.

The population of Sinai has largely consisted of desert-dwelling Bedouins with their colourful traditional costumes and significant culture. Large numbers of Egyptians from the Nile Valley and Delta moved to the area to work in tourism, but development adversely affected the native Bedouin population. In order to help alleviate their problems, various NGOs began to operate in the region, including the Makhad Trust, a UK charity that assists the Bedouin in developing a sustainable income while protecting Sinai's natural environment, heritage and culture.

== Economy ==
Sinai's scenic spots (including coral reefs offshore) and religious structures have become important to the tourism industry. The most popular tourist destination in Sinai are Mount Sinai (Jabal Musa) and St Catherine's Monastery, which is considered to be the oldest working Christian monastery in the world, and the beach resorts of Sharm el-Sheikh, Dahab, Nuweiba and Taba. Most tourists arrive at Sharm El Sheikh International Airport, through Eilat, Israel and the Taba Border Crossing, by road from Cairo or by ferry from Aqaba in Jordan.

Cacti – especially cactus pears – are grown in Sinai. They are a crop of the Columbian Exchange. Cactus hedges – both intentionally planted and wild garden escapes – formed an important part of defensible positions during the Sinai and Palestine campaign of World War I. Some unfamiliar soldiers even tried eating them, to negative result.

Dromedary herding is important here. Trypanosoma evansi is a constant concern and is transmitted by several vectors. Although ticks have not been proven to be among them, Mahmoud and Gray 1980 and El-Kady 1998 experimentally demonstrate survival of T. evansi in camel ticks of the Hyalomma for several hours in the real bio-climatic conditions of Sinai.

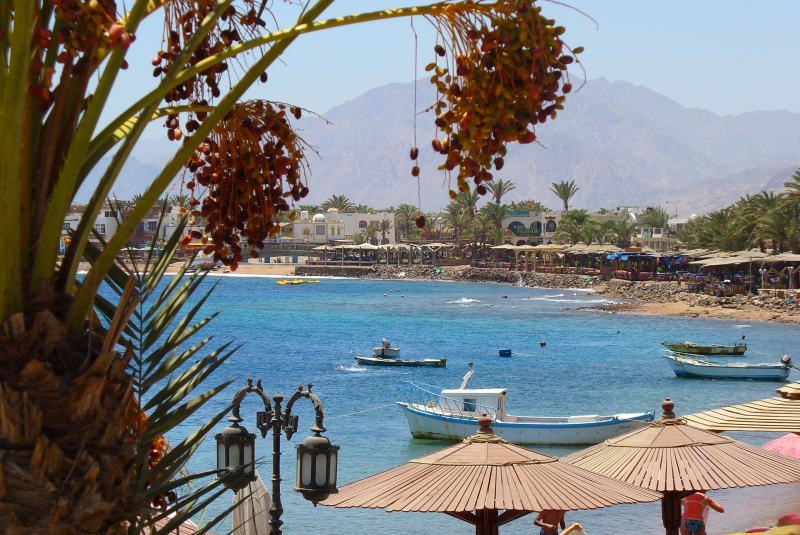
Dahab in southern Sinai is a popular beach and diving resort

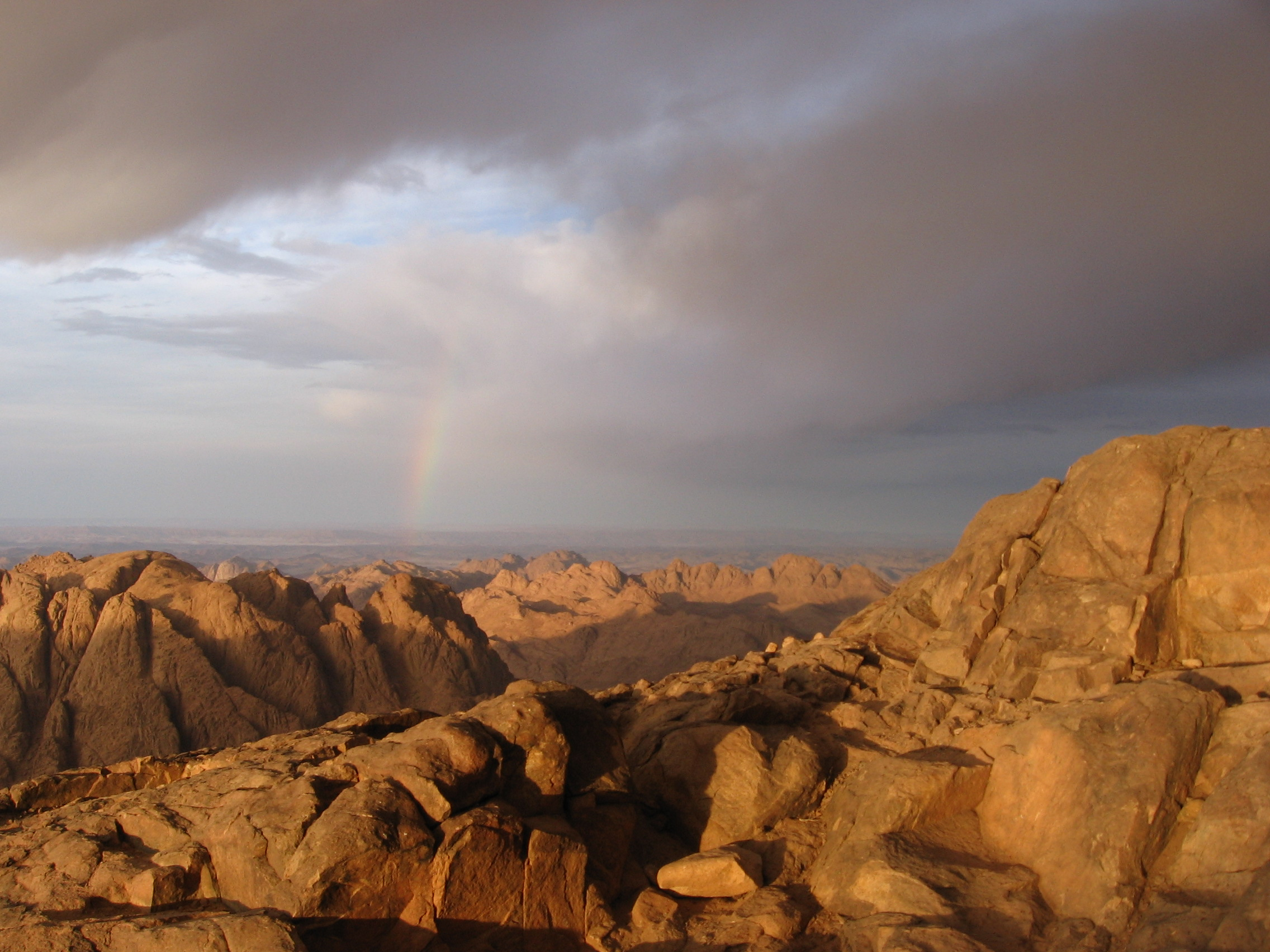
Gabal or Jebel Musa, identified by Christians with Mount Sinai

Notable past (purple) and current (orange) land bridges on a bathymetric equirectangular projection centred on 45° E

== See also ==
- Multinational Force and Observers
- Negev Bedouin
- Operation Eagle
- South Sinai regional development programme

=== Manmade structures ===
- Nawamis

=== Natural places ===
- Desert of Paran
- Mitla Pass
- Um Adawi Granites

=== Wildlife ===
- Sinai leopard
