= Rahel Tewelde =

Eritrean filmmaker (born 1974)

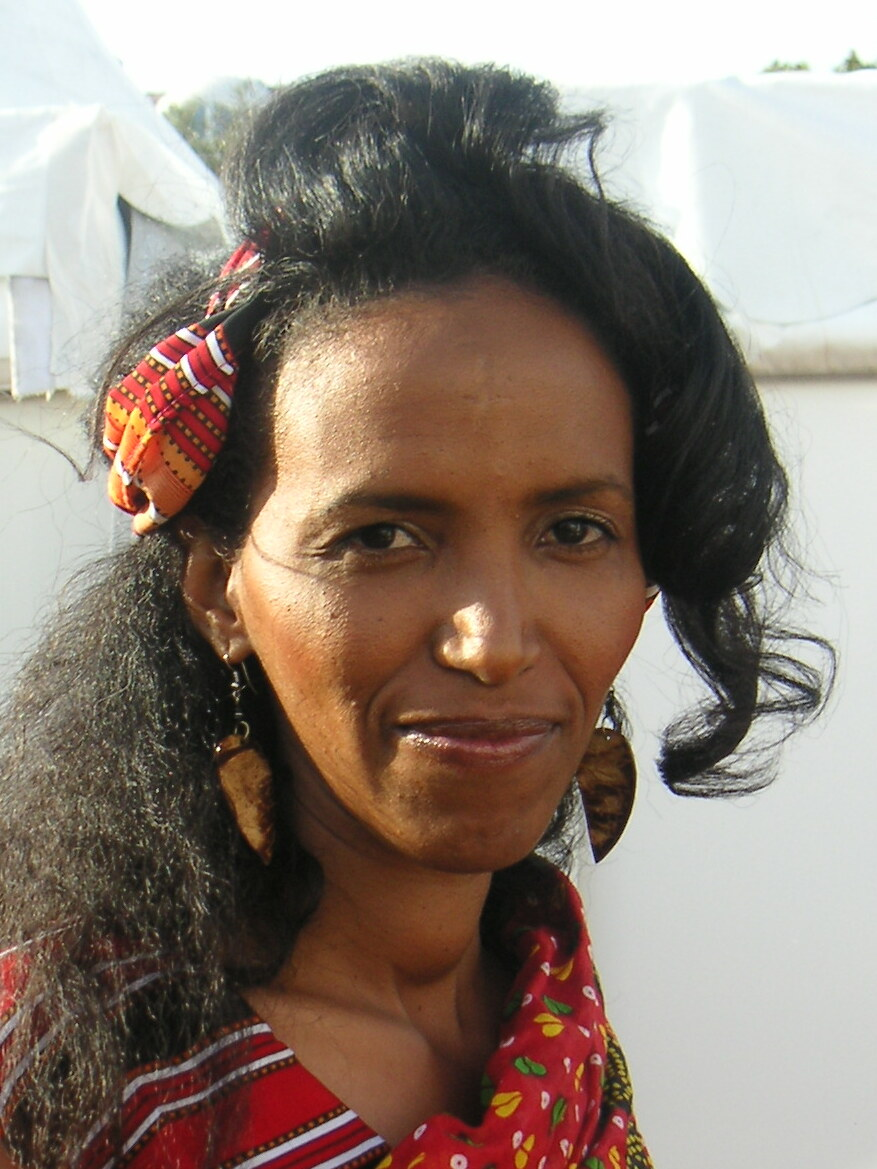
- Born: 1974 (age 51–52)
- Occupation: filmmaker

Rahel Tewelde (born 1974) is an Eritrean filmmaker.

Rahel Tewelde studied in Asmara. Her first film Hid'get was screened on Eritrean television. Tewelde has also translated the film Casablanca into Tigrinya.

== Films ==
- Hid'get [Forgiveness], 2003
- Shikorinatat [The Beautiful Ones], 2006.
