= Bani Walid detention camp =

Prison in Libya

The Bani Walid detention camp is a secret prison in northwest Libya near the town of Bani Walid operated by human traffickers since at least 2009. Prisoners at the center often come from subsaharan Africa en route to Europe, and include adolescents and women. In order to extort their families, detention guards reportedly torture, rape, or threaten prisoners, who face similar conditions in other camps in the region. In May 2018, many Bani Walid prisoners attempted to escape, with most being shot or recaptured.

Agence France Presse has reported that there are approximately 20 detention centers in and around the town of Bani Walid.

== Origins ==
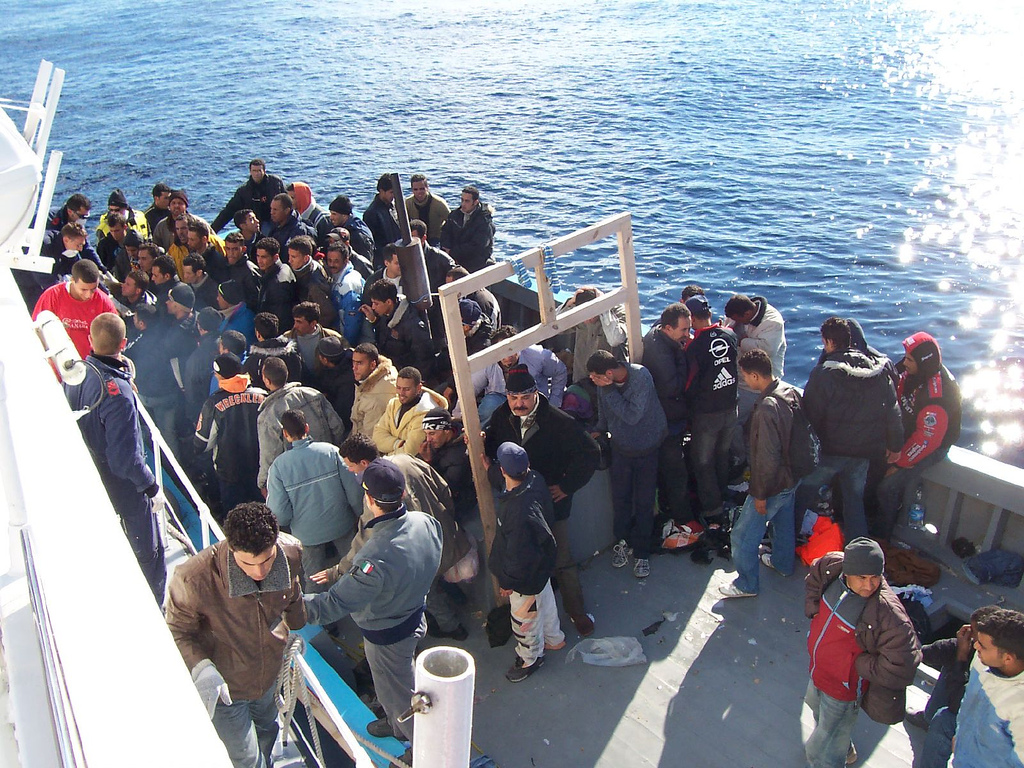
Migrants arrived in Lampedusa, Italy

The Geneva nonprofit agency Global Detention Project has reported that the Bani Walid Immigrant Detention Centre has been in operation since 2009. After the 2011 fall of the government of Muammar Gaddafi, Libya became a major site of transit for migrants desperate to reach Europe, and Bani Walid is an important node in the migration route. As of 2018 there were approximately 700,000 migrants in Libya.

== Conditions ==
Reuters and Doctors Without Borders (Medecins Sans Frontières, or MSF), which has worked in the region around Bani Walid since 2017, have stated that migrants are often kidnapped or tortured for extortion. The BBC have reported that migrants are forced to call home while being tortured, in order to extort money from families. The World Socialist Web Site has reported that the Ben Walid camp is privately operated and that the United Nations does not have access to it.

In October 2017, a former guard at the Bani Walid camp, Osman Matammud, was convicted in Milan, Italy of murder, abduction, and sexual violence against female detainees at the Bani Walid detention camp. At the trial, witnesses to torture and abuse in the camp said that young women were repeatedly raped, and that plastic bags were placed on the backs of migrants and set on fire. Others said that migrants died from torture, starvation, thirst or lack of medical treatment.

Ilda Boccassini, an Italian prosecutor who has spent her career prosecuting the Mafia, stated that conditions in Bani Walid were similar to those in transit camps throughout the region.

MSF have stated that they provide 50 body bags each month to an organization in Bani Walid that attempts to bury migrant dead in the area, and that 730 migrants were buried in 2017.

== 2018 escape ==
On May 25, 2018, MSF reported that over 100 detainees held at the camp were shot as they attempted to escape. At least 15 were killed and 40 were left behind at the camp, with those remaining mostly women. Residents, elders, and doctors of the town of Bani Walid attempted to defend the escapees who reached the town against detention camp staff pursuing them.

MSF doctors treated 25 of the escapees at Bani Walid General hospital, where victims suffered from serious gunshot wounds and fractures. Many had scars from old wounds sustained from up to three years of captivity, which included electric burns. Some survivors said that they had left and been sold back to the camp numerous times. Survivors of the escape attempt were primarily adolescents from Eritrea, Ethiopia and Somalia, some seeking asylum in Europe. The survivors were moved to a security facility in Bani Walid and then to detention camps in Tripoli.

== Arrests ==
In February 2020, Kidane Zekarias Habtemariam, brutal head of Bani Walid detention camp, was arrested in Addis Abeba, but in 2021 he managed to escape by bribing guards. He was later sentenced in absentia to life in prison. He was subsequently recaptured and imprisoned. Also, Tewelde Goitom was arrested in March 2020.

== See also ==
- Detention centres in Libya
- Arbitrary arrest and detention
- Kidnapping
- Extortion
- European migrant crisis
- Libyan Civil War (2014–present)
