= Refugee kidnappings in Sinai =

Kidnapping of African refugees by Bedouins in Sinai, Egypt (2009–2014)

Large numbers of refugee kidnappings in Sinai occurred between 2009 and 2014. Refugees from Sudan, Ethiopia and Eritrea were transported to Sinai and held hostage by members of Bedouin tribes. Typically, the hostages were forced to give up phone numbers of relatives and were tortured with the relatives on the phone, in order to obtain ransoms in the range of $20,000–$40,000. If the families could not pay, the hostages were killed. The Egypt–Israel barrier, designed to keep out African migrants, caused the Rashaida traffickers to lose income from transporting refugees to the border, so they started to concentrate on kidnappings.

In 2013, Physicians for Human Rights–Israel estimated that about 1,000 refugees were being held, and that in total about 7,000 refugees had been abused in Sinai hostage camps, resulting in more than 4,000 deaths. In 2014, Egyptian security forces fought unrelated insurgent networks committing terror attacks in the peninsula, and the kidnapping of refugees moved to Libya and elsewhere.

== History ==
Between 2009 and 2014, many refugees from Sudan, Ethiopia or Eritrea, paid traffickers for transport to the Israeli border, hoping to cross into that country. They were instead taken hostage by those they had paid. Others were taken by force from refugee camps in Sudan, as reported by the United Nations Refugee Agency in January 2013. Amnesty International published a report about numerous kidnappings in 2011-2013 in the Shagarab refugee camps in eastern Sudan, carried out by members of the Rashaida tribe, with victims being sold off to gangs in Sinai, where they would be brutally mistreated to extract ransoms.

The phenomenon was first documented by Israeli organization Hotline for Refugees and Migrants in 2010 in a report entitled In the Dead of the Wilderness. The report was based on testimonies they collected from 60 asylum seekers, mostly Eritreans, who had been tortured for ransom in the Sinai desert. Staff and volunteers of the organisation mostly met the survivors in Israeli immigration detention centers where they were visiting recently arrived asylum seekers. Many people arrived with serious injuries, and some women arrived pregnant as a result of rape. Seriously injured people were immediately taken to hospital upon arrival in Israel.

A 2011 CNN documentary reported on Eritrean refugees who had paid Bedouin traffickers for transport to Israel but were instead held in bondage before their organs were harvested.

In February 2011, Physicians for Human Rights–Israel reported that some 190 Eritrean and Ethiopian refugees were being held hostage in Sinai, and that numerous refugee women reported having been raped on their trip to Israel.

In 2012, Israel constructed a fence at its border in Sinai to keep out African migrants, causing the Rashaida to lose income from transporting refugees to the border; they then started to concentrate on kidnappings instead.

In 2013, Physicians for Human Rights–Israel estimated that about 1,000 refugees were being held in Sinai hostage camps, and that in total about 7,000 refugees had been abused in these camps, resulting in more than 4,000 deaths.

German journalist Michael Obert visited the region in 2013, met a victim and a torturer and talked to an activist of the New Generation Foundation for Human Rights in Al-Arish. The organization has documented hundreds of cases of mutilated corpses of Africans found in the desert. The Al-Arish activist presented photos of corpses from which organs had been "professionally removed" and claimed to have seen mobile operation units. Obert reported that some Islamist militants were using force to try to stop the kidnapper gangs. He described a lawless and impoverished region where children were looking forward to grow up to become kidnappers.

In a 2013 report, This American Life reported on the experiences of journalist Meron Estefanos, who has helped publicize the kidnappings, and helped get some hostages freed.

The Egypt–Israel peace treaty of 1979 limits the number of Egyptian forces that can be deployed in Sinai. After the Egyptian Revolution of 2011, security forces had largely abandoned the peninsula, but they returned in 2014 to fight unrelated insurgent networks committing terror attacks in the peninsula, and the practice of kidnapping refugees moved to Libya and elsewhere.

== See also ==
- Hawala
- Sudanese refugees in Egypt
