= Kidane Zekarias Habtemariam =

Eritrean human trafficker (born 1975)

- Born: 1975; Zirben
- Occupation: human trafficker
- Known for: Human Trafficking

Kidane Zekarias Habtemariam is an Eritrean, on trial (as of June 2026) in the Netherlands on multiple charges relating to human trafficking. For some years he had been wanted for alleged large-scale human trafficking of people from Africa to Europe. He has been described as "one of the world's most notorious and most brutal human traffickers".

It is alleged that Habtemariam smuggled migrants from Eritrea, Ethiopia, Somalia and Sudan, through Libya to Europe. Victims faced kidnappings, torture, aggravated beatings, and rapings. He is said to have extorted as much money as possible from migrants. He operated a warehouse - Bani Walid in Libya. According to the Dutch Public Prosecution Service he led an 'extremely violent criminal organization'.

Habtemariam apparently worked with another human trafficker, Tewelde Goitom, and at least five others who are named in ongoing legal proceedings in the Netherlands.

== Arrests and legal process ==
In 2020 Habtemariam was arrested in Ethiopia. In 2021 he escaped custody. He was later sentenced in absentia to life in prison. Subsequently, the United Arab Emirates tracked him down in a money laundering investigation, and he was arrested on 1 January 2023 in Sudan.

He served 18 months in prison in the UAE for money laundering, whereafter he was extradited from the UAE to the Netherlands (where there is a significant Eritrean community) to face trial. A preliminary hearing was held on 31 March 2026.
