= Mikoyan MiG-29 =

Soviet twin-engine jet fighter aircraft

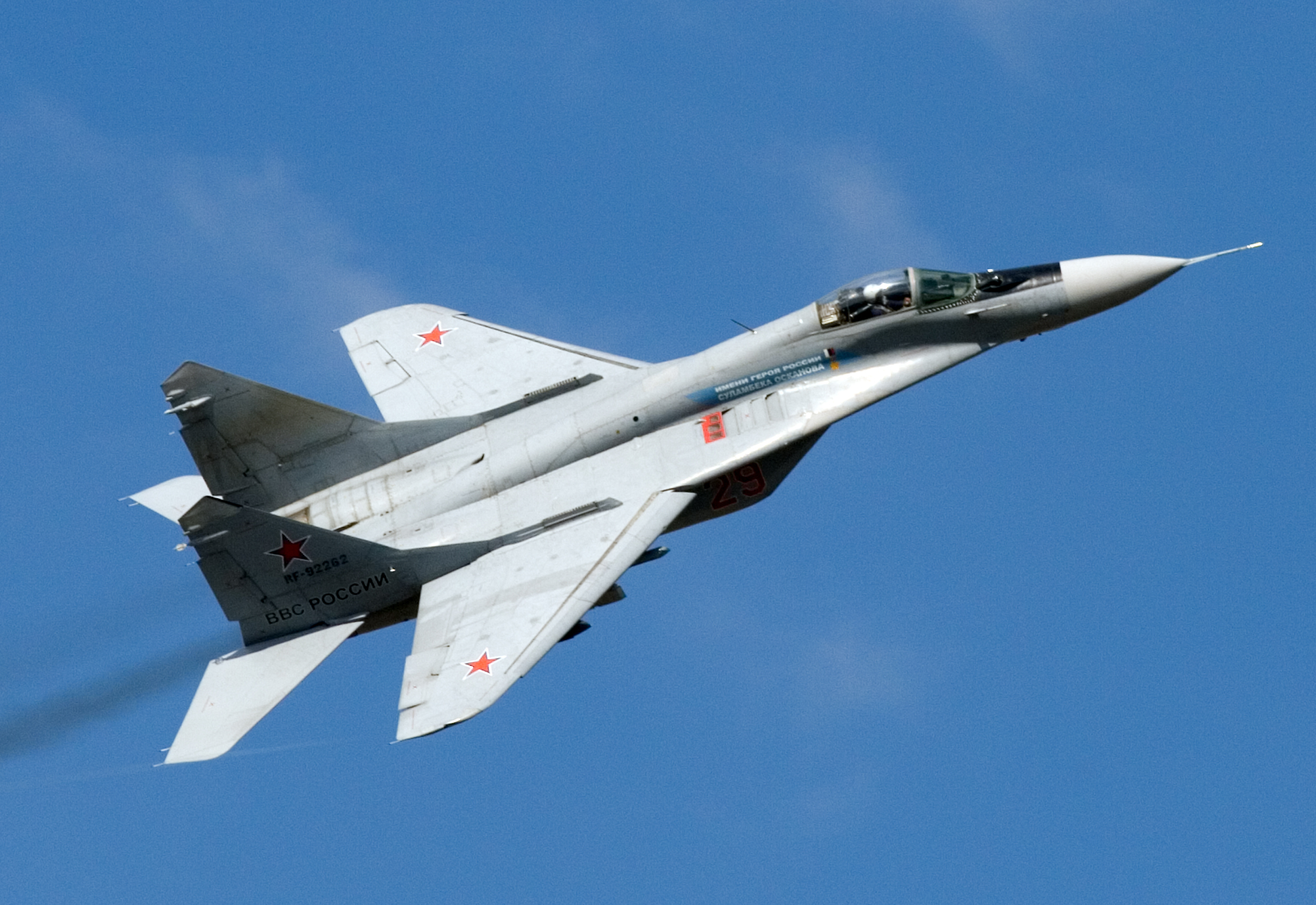
- A Russian Air Force MiG-29S

General information
- Type: Air superiority fighter, multirole fighter
- National origin: Soviet Union
- Designer: Mikoyan
- Status: In service
- Primary users: Russian Aerospace Forces Indian Air Force; Algerian Air Force; Ukrainian Air Force
- Number built: 1,600+

History
- Manufactured: 1981–2019
- Introduction date: August 1983
- First flight: 6 October 1977
- Variants: Mikoyan MiG-29M; Mikoyan MiG-29K; Mikoyan MiG-35

The Mikoyan MiG-29 (Russian: Микоян МиГ-29; NATO reporting name: Fulcrum) is a twin-engine fighter aircraft designed in the Soviet Union. Developed by the Mikoyan design bureau as an air superiority fighter during the 1970s, the MiG-29, along with the larger Sukhoi Su-27, was developed to counter U.S. fighters such as the McDonnell Douglas F-15 Eagle and the General Dynamics F-16 Fighting Falcon. The MiG-29 entered service with the Soviet Air Forces in 1983.

While originally oriented towards combat against any enemy aircraft, many MiG-29s have been furnished as multirole fighters capable of performing a number of different operations, and are commonly outfitted to use a range of air-to-surface armaments and precision munitions. The MiG-29 has been manufactured in several major variants, including the multirole Mikoyan MiG-29M and the navalised Mikoyan MiG-29K; the most advanced member of the family to date is the Mikoyan MiG-35. Later models frequently feature improved engines, glass cockpits with HOTAS ("hands-on-throttle-and-stick")-compatible flight controls, modern radar and infrared search and track (IRST) sensors, and considerably increased fuel capacity; some aircraft have also been equipped for aerial refueling.

Following the dissolution of the Soviet Union, the militaries of multiple ex-Soviet republics have continued to operate the MiG-29, the largest of them being the Russian Aerospace Forces. The Russian Aerospace Forces wanted to upgrade its existing fleet to the modernised MiG-29SMT configuration, but financial difficulties have limited deliveries. The MiG-29 has also been a popular export aircraft; more than 30 nations either operate or have operated the aircraft. As of 2026 an estimated 728 MiG-29/35 variants remain in service worldwide, representing the sixth largest fleet and 5% of active combat aircraft.

== Development ==
=== Origins ===
In the mid-1960s, the United States Air Force (USAF) encountered difficulties over the skies of Vietnam. Supersonic fighter bombers that had been optimized for low altitude bombing, like the F-105 Thunderchief, were found to be vulnerable to older MiG-17s and more advanced MiGs which were much more maneuverable. In order to regain limited air superiority, the US refocused on air combat using the F-4 Phantom multirole fighter, while the Soviet Union developed the MiG-23 in response. Towards the end of the 1960s, the USAF started the "F-X" program to produce a fighter dedicated to air superiority, which led to the McDonnell Douglas F-15 Eagle being ordered for production in late 1969.

At the height of the Cold War, a Soviet response was necessary to avoid the possibility of the Americans gaining a serious technological advantage over the Soviets, thus the development of a new air superiority fighter became a priority. In 1969, the Soviet General Staff issued a requirement for a Perspektivnyy Frontovoy Istrebitel (PFI, roughly "Advanced Frontline Fighter"). Specifications were extremely ambitious, calling for long range, good short-field performance (including the ability to use austere runways), excellent agility, Mach 2+ speed, and heavy armament. The Russian aerodynamics institute TsAGI worked in collaboration with the Sukhoi design bureau on the aircraft's aerodynamics.

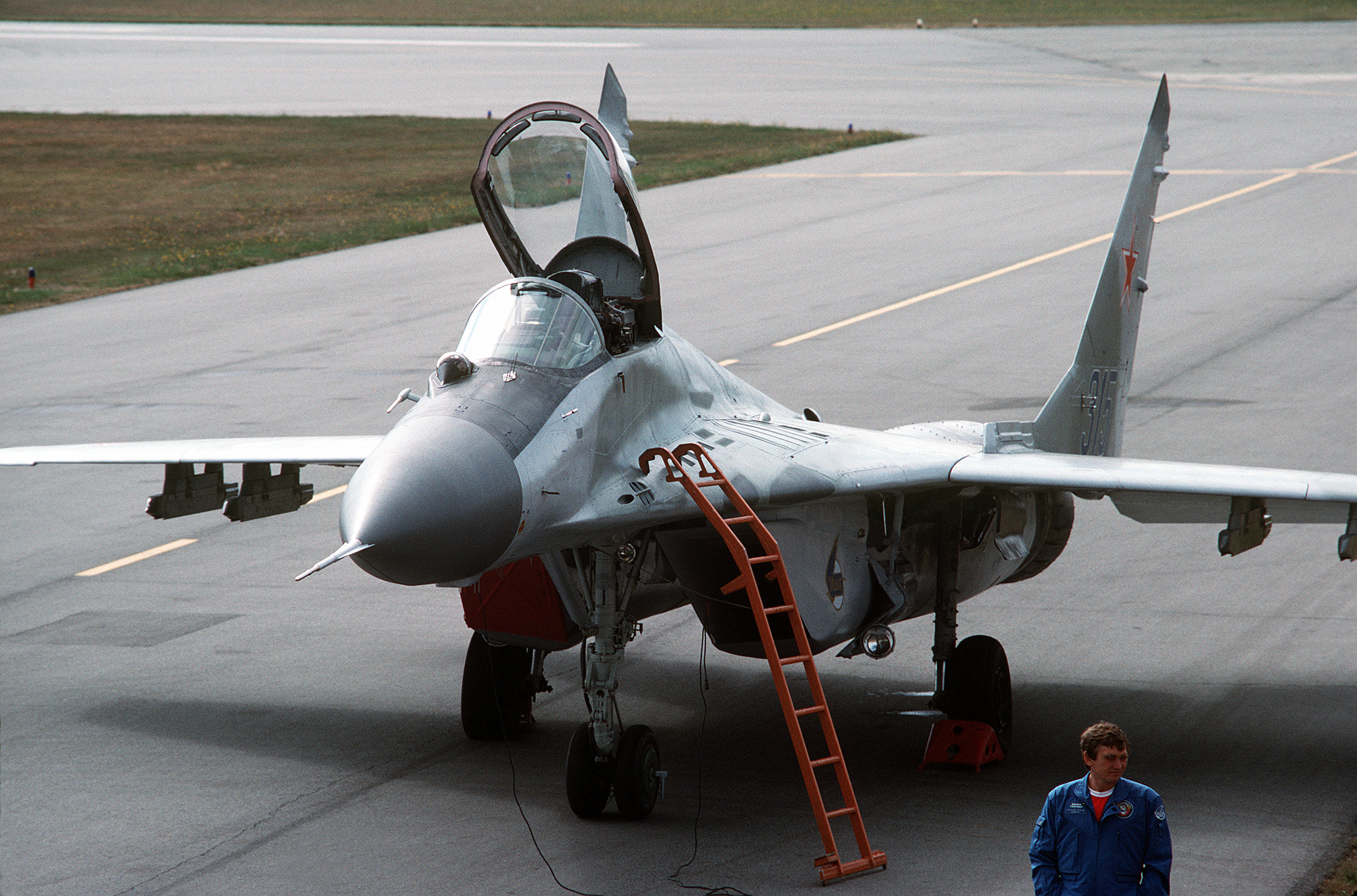
A Soviet Air Forces MiG-29 parked after a display flight at the Abbotsford Air Show, 1989

By 1971, however, Soviet studies determined the need for different types of fighters. The PFI program was supplemented with the Perspektivnyy Lyogkiy Frontovoy Istrebitel (LPFI, or "Advanced Lightweight Tactical Fighter") program; the Soviet fighter force was planned to be approximately 33% PFI and 67% LPFI. PFI and LPFI paralleled the USAF's decision that created the "Lightweight Fighter" program and the General Dynamics F-16 Fighting Falcon and Northrop YF-17. The PFI fighter was assigned to Sukhoi, resulting in the Sukhoi Su-27, while the lightweight fighter went to Mikoyan. Detailed design work on the resultant Mikoyan Product 9, designated MiG-29A, began in 1974, with the first flight taking place on 6 October 1977. The pre-production aircraft was first spotted by United States reconnaissance satellites in November of that year; it was dubbed Ram-L because it was observed at the Zhukovsky flight test center near the town of Ramenskoye.

The workload split between TPFI and LPFI became more apparent as the MiG-29 filtered into frontline service with the Soviet Air Forces (Russian: Voenno-Vozdushnye Sily [VVS]) in the mid-1980s. While the heavy, long range Su-27 was tasked with the more exotic and dangerous role of deep air-to-air sweeps of NATO high-value assets, the smaller MiG-29 directly replaced the MiG-23 in the frontal aviation role.

=== Introduction and improvements ===
In the West, the new fighter was given the NATO reporting name "Fulcrum-A" because the pre-production MiG-29A, which should have logically received this designation, remained unknown in the West at that time. The Soviet Union did not assign official names to most of its aircraft, although nicknames were common. Unusually, some Soviet pilots found the MiG-29's NATO reporting name, "Fulcrum", to be a flattering description of the aircraft's intended purpose, and it is sometimes unofficially used in Russian service.

The MiG-29 was widely exported in downgraded versions, known as MiG-29 9-12A for Warsaw Pact and MiG-29 9-12B for non-Warsaw Pact nations, with less capable avionics and no capability for delivering nuclear weapons.

In the 1980s, Mikoyan developed the improved MiG-29S to use longer range R-27E air-to-air missiles. It added a dorsal 'hump' to the upper fuselage to house a jamming system and some additional fuel capacity. The weapons load was increased to 4,000 kg (8,800 lb) with airframe strengthening. These features were included in new-built fighters and upgrades to older MiG-29s.

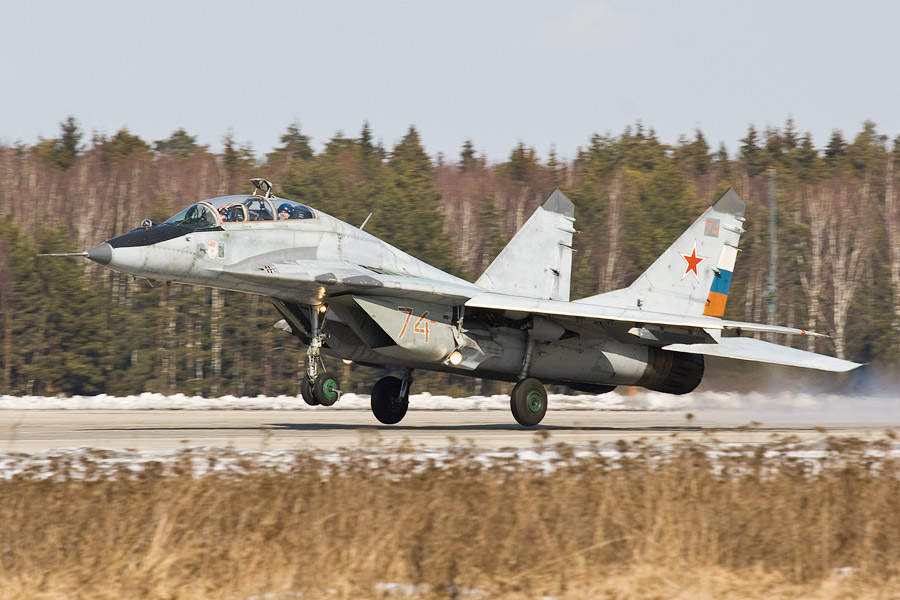
A Russian Air Force MiG-29UB trainer landing

Refined versions of the MiG-29 with improved avionics were fielded by the Soviet Union, but Mikoyan's multirole variants, including a carrier-based version designated MiG-29K, were never produced in large numbers. Development of the MiG-29K version for use in aircraft carriers, was suspended for over a decade before being resumed. The type went into service with the Indian Navy's INS Vikramaditya, INS Vikrant, and Russian Navy's Kuznetsov class aircraft carriers. Mikoyan also developed improved versions MiG-29M and MiG-29SMT.

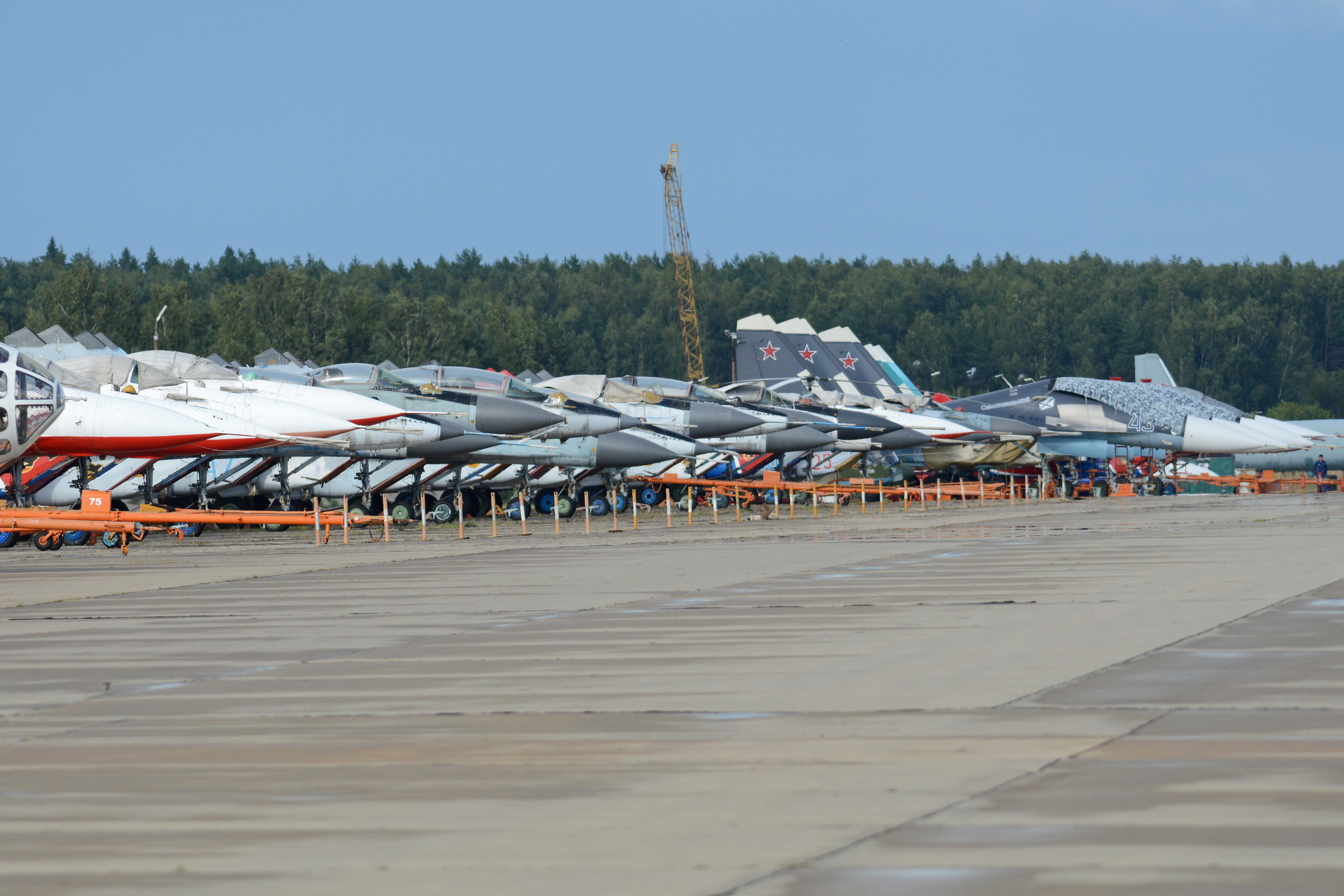
Russian Naval Aviation's various MiG-29s stationed at Kubinka alongside the newer and heavier Su-30SM

There have been several upgrade programmes conducted for the MiG-29. Common upgrades include the adoption of standard-compatible avionics, service life extensions to 4,000 flight hours, safety enhancements, greater combat capabilities and reliability.

=== Replacement ===
On 11 December 2013, Russian deputy prime minister Dmitry Rogozin revealed that Russia was planning to build a new fighter to replace the MiG-29. The Sukhoi Su-27 and its derivatives were to be replaced by the Sukhoi Su-57, but a different design was needed to directly replace the lighter MiGs. A previous attempt to develop a MiG-29 replacement, the MiG 1.44 demonstrator, failed in the 1990s. The concept came up again in 2001 with interest from India, but they later opted for a variant of the Su-57. Air Force commanders have hinted at the possibility of a single-engine airframe that uses the Su-57's engine, radar, and weapons primarily for Russian service. This has since been revealed to be the Sukhoi Su-75 Checkmate. Meanwhile, in Russian service, the MiG-29 has been largely replaced by the Sukhoi Su-30SM, representing a loss in market share of the MiG-29 series to the Sukhoi heavier platforms.

== Design ==
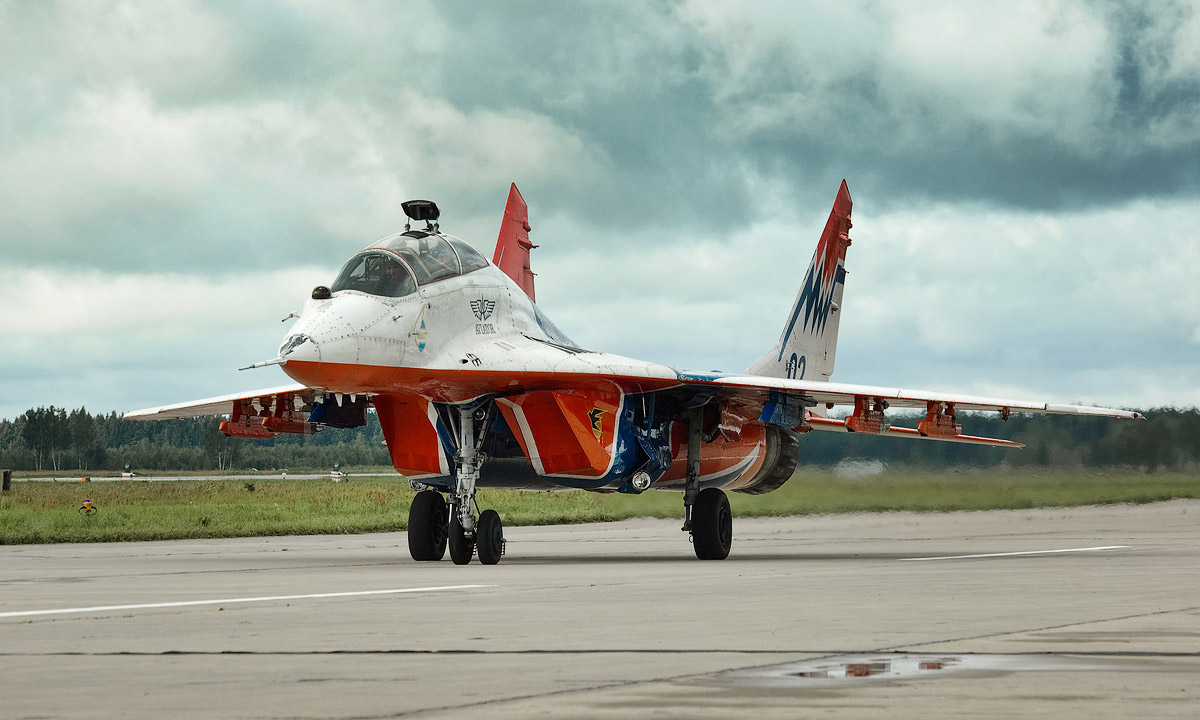
MiG-29UB of the Swifts aerobatic team

Sharing its origins in the original PFI requirements issued by TsAGI, the MiG-29 has broad aerodynamic similarities to the Sukhoi Su-27, but with some notable differences. The MiG-29 has a mid-mounted swept wing with blended leading-edge root extensions (LERXs) swept at around 40°; there are swept tailplanes and two vertical fins, mounted on booms outboard of the engines. Automatic slats are mounted on the leading edges of the wings; they are four-segment on early models and five-segment on some later variants. On the trailing edge, there are maneuvering flaps and wingtip ailerons.

The MiG-29 has hydraulic controls and a SAU-451 three-axis autopilot but, unlike the Su-27, no fly-by-wire control system. Nonetheless, it is very agile, with excellent instantaneous and sustained turn performance, high-alpha capability, and a general resistance to spins. The airframe consists primarily of aluminum with some composite materials, and is stressed for up to 9 g (88 m/s²) maneuvers. The controls have "soft" limiters to prevent the pilot from exceeding g and alpha limits, but the limiters can be disabled manually.

=== Powerplant, performance and range ===
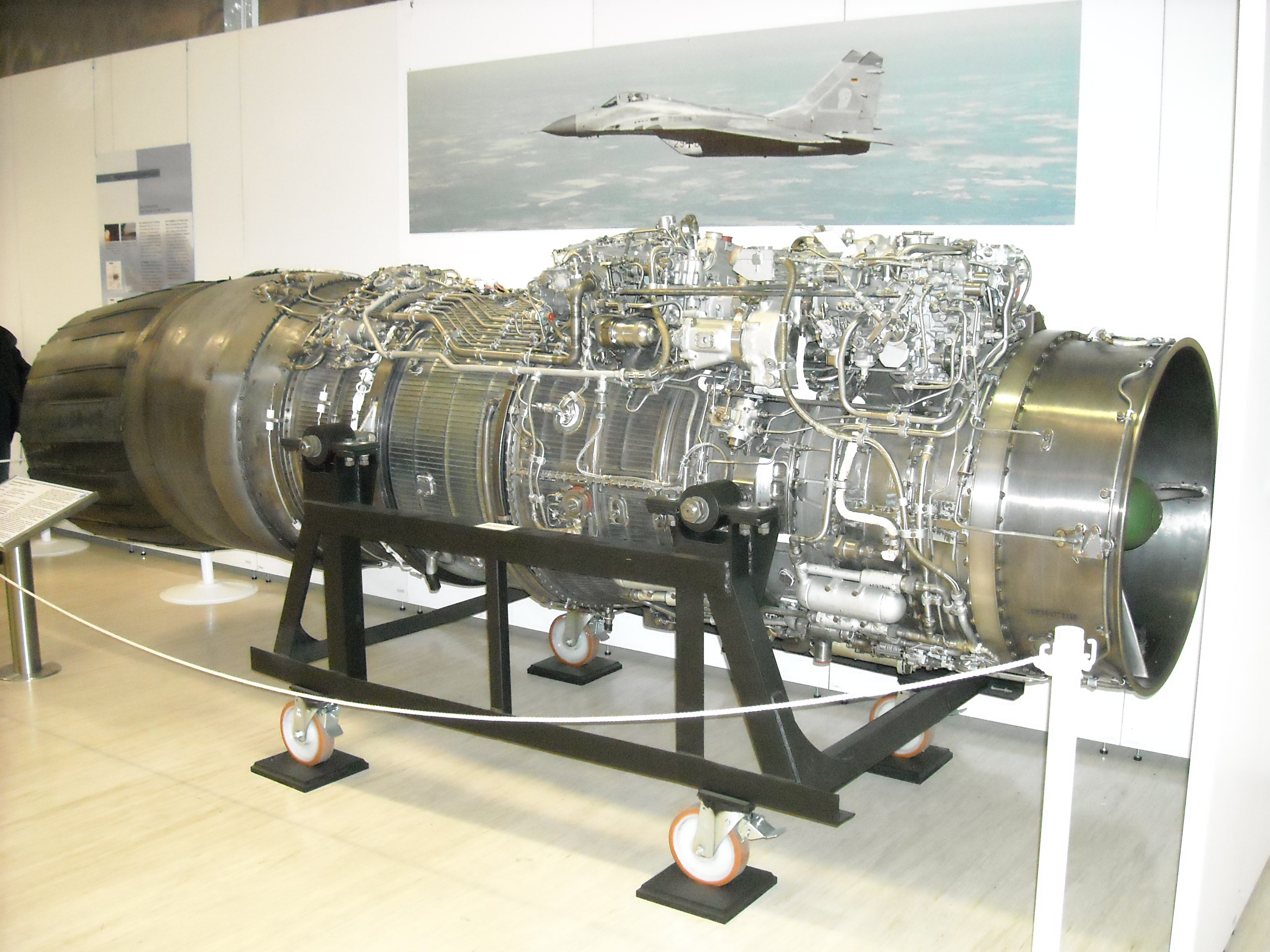
RD-33 on display at the Luftwaffenmuseum of the Bundeswehr

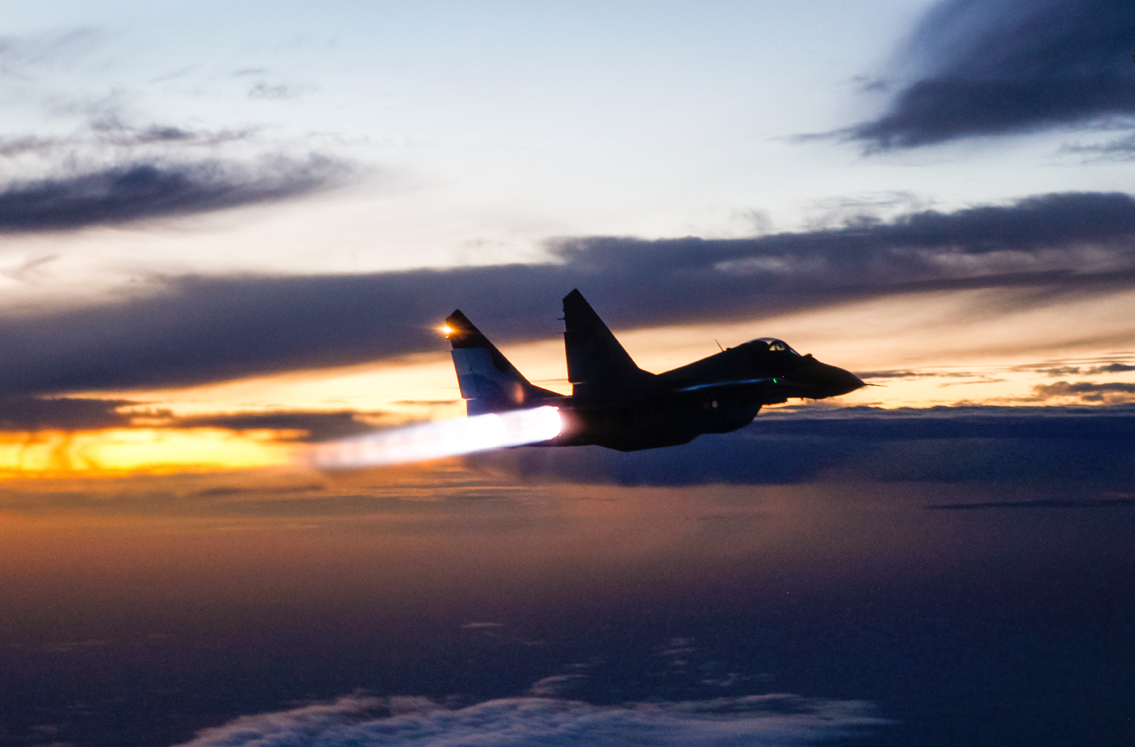
A Bangladesh Air Force MiG-29 inflight with its Klimov RD-33 turbofan engines on full afterburner

The MiG-29 has two widely spaced Klimov RD-33 turbofan engines, each rated at 50 kilonewtons (11,200 lbf) dry and 81.3 kilonewtons (18,300 lbf) in afterburner. The space between the engines generates lift, thereby reducing effective wing loading, hence improving maneuverability. The engines are fed through intake ramps fitted under the leading-edge extensions (LERXs), which have variable ramps to allow high-Mach speeds. Due to their relatively short combustor, the engines produce noticeably heavier smoke than their contemporaries. As an adaptation to rough-field operations, the main air inlet can be closed completely and the auxiliary air inlet on the upper fuselage can be used for takeoff, landing and low-altitude flying, preventing ingestion of ground debris. Thereby the engines receive air through louvers on the LERXs which open automatically when intakes are closed. However the latest variant of the family, the MiG-35, eliminated these dorsal louvers, and adopted the mesh screens design in the main intakes, similar to those fitted to the Su-27.

The MiG-29 has a ferry range of 1,500 km (930 mi) without external fuel tanks, and 2,100 km (1,300 mi) with external tanks. The internal fuel capacity of the original MiG-29 (Fulcrum-A) is 4,300 L (950 imp gal; 1,100 US gal) distributed between six internal fuel tanks, four in the fuselage and one in each wing. The internal fuel capacity of the MiG-29 (Fulcrum-C) is 4,540 L (1,000 imp gal; 1,200 US gal) due to a larger #1 fuselage tank. For longer flights, this can be supplemented by a 1,500 L (330 imp gal; 400 US gal) centreline drop tank on the Fulcrum-A and two 1,150 L (250 imp gal; 300 US gal) underwing drop tanks on later production batches. In addition, newer models have been fitted with port-side inflight refueling probes, allowing much longer flight times by using a probe-and-drogue system.

=== Cockpit ===
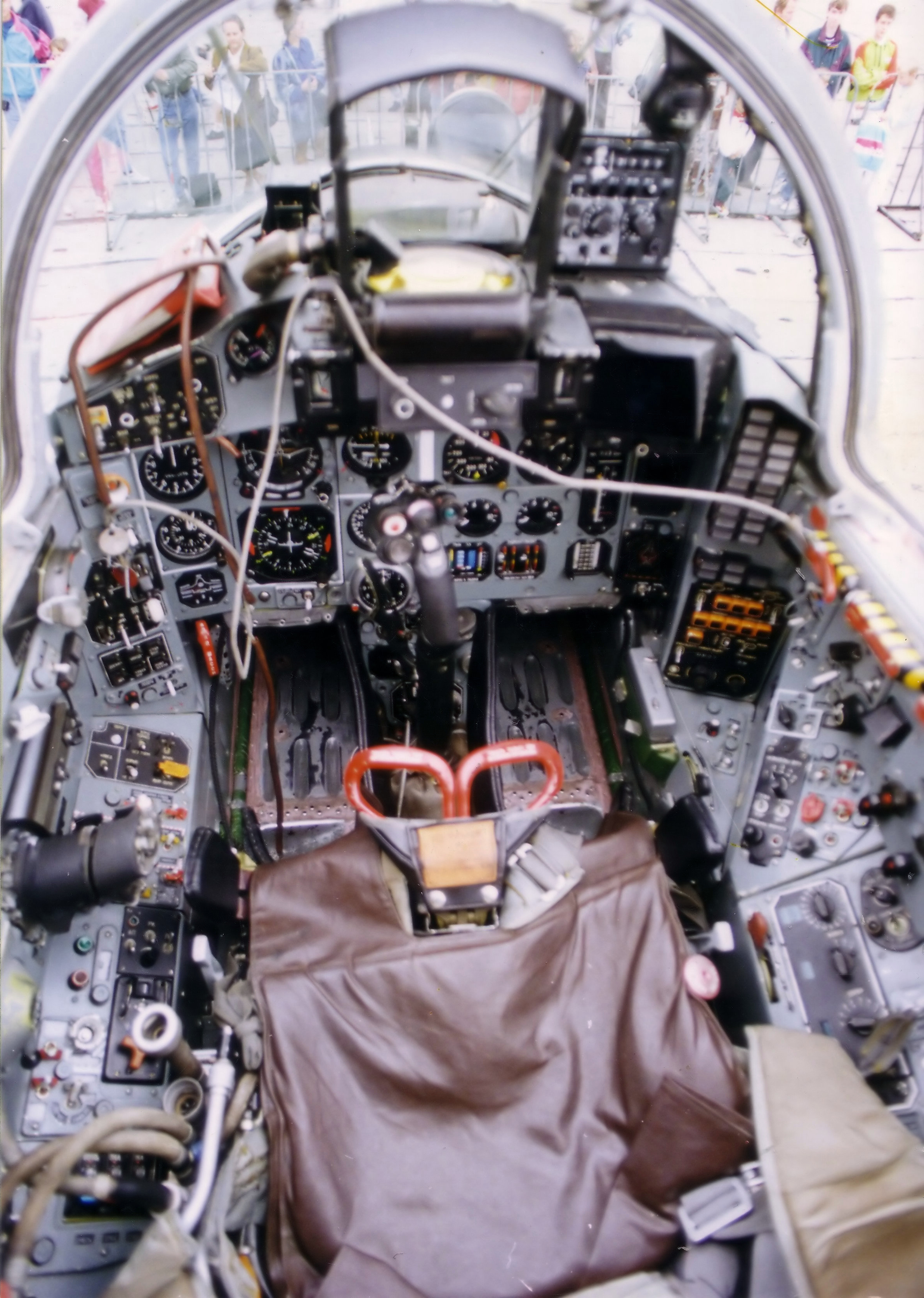
MiG-29 cockpit, 1995

The cockpit features a conventional centre stick and left hand throttle controls. The pilot sits in a Zvezda K-36DM ejection seat.

The cockpit has conventional dials, with a head-up display (HUD) and a Shchel-3UM helmet mounted display, but no HOTAS capability. Emphasis seems to have been placed on making the cockpit similar to the earlier MiG-23 and other Soviet aircraft for ease of conversion, rather than on ergonomics. Nonetheless, the MiG-29 does have substantially better visibility than most previous Soviet jet fighters, thanks to a high-mounted bubble canopy. Upgraded models introduce "glass cockpits" with modern liquid-crystal (LCD) multi-function displays (MFDs) and true HOTAS.

=== Sensors ===
The baseline MiG-29 9.12 has a Phazotron RLPK-29 radar fire control system which includes the N019 Sapfir 29 look-down/shoot-down coherent pulse-Doppler radar and the Ts100.02-02 digital computer.

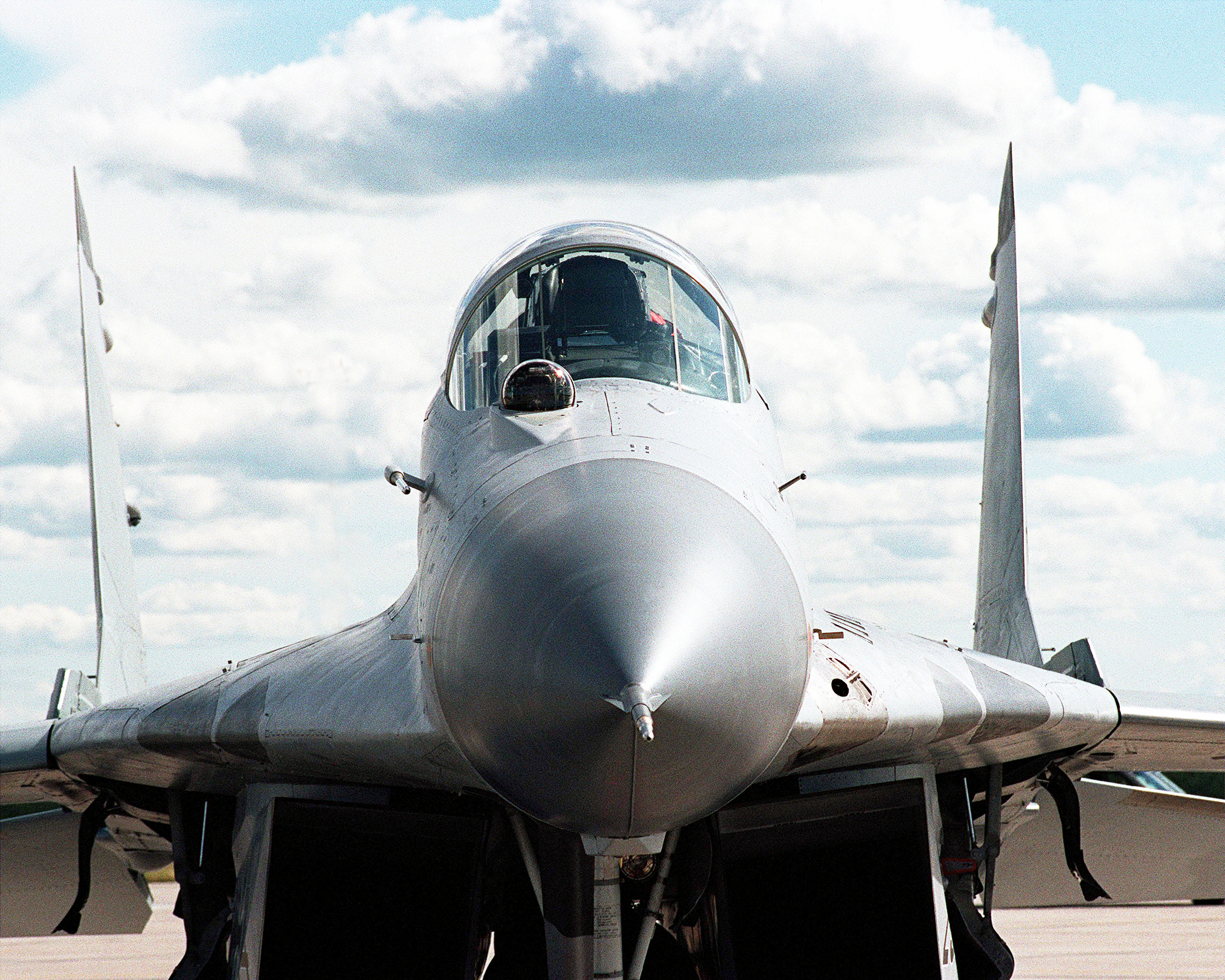
MiG-29 nose showing radome and S-31E2 KOLS IRST

The N019 radar was not a new design, but rather a development of the Sapfir-23ML architecture used on the MiG-23ML. During the initial design specification period in the mid-1970s, Phazotron NIIR was tasked with producing a modern radar for the MiG-29. To speed development, Phazotron based its new design on work undertaken by NPO Istok on the experimental "Soyuz" radar program. Accordingly, the N019 was originally intended to have a flat planar array antenna and full digital signal processing, for a detection and tracking range of at least 100 km (62 mi) against a fighter-sized target. Prototype testing revealed this could not be attained in the required timeframe and still fit within the MiG-29's nose. Rather than design a new radar, Phazotron reverted to a version of the Sapfir-23ML's twisted-polarization cassegrain antenna and traditional analog signal processors, coupled with a new NII Argon-designed Ts100 digital computer to save time and cost. This produced a working radar system, but inherited the weak points of the earlier design, plaguing the MiG-29's ability to detect and track airborne targets at ranges available with the R-27 and R-77 missiles.

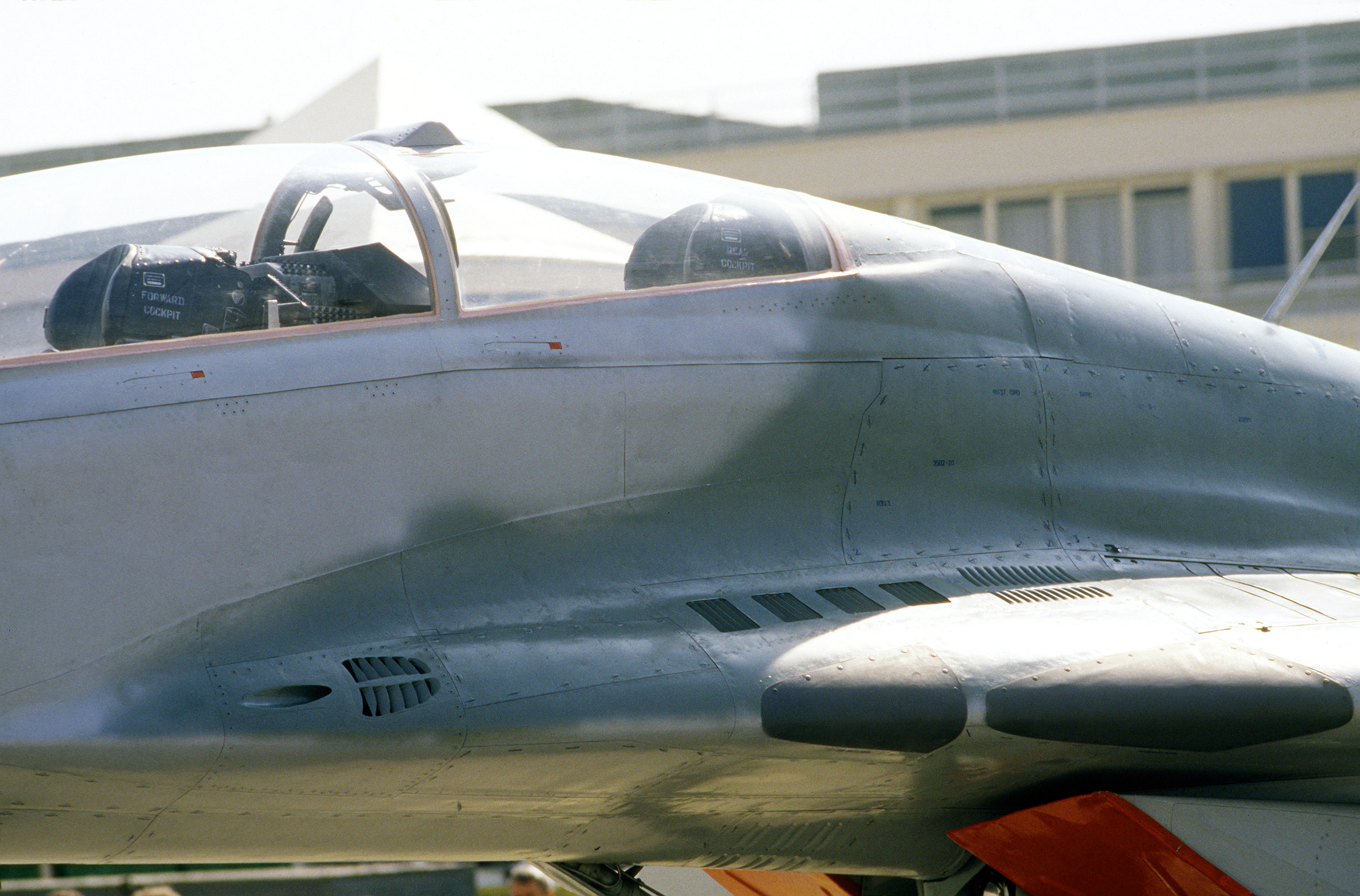
MiG-29UB on display, showing gunport

The N019 was further compromised by Phazotron designer Adolf Tolkachev's betrayal of the radar to the CIA, for which he was executed in 1986. In response to all of these problems, the Soviets hastily developed a modified N019M Topaz radar for the upgraded MiG-29S aircraft. However, VVS was reportedly still not satisfied with the performance of the system and demanded another upgrade. The latest upgraded aircraft, MiG-29M, offered the N010 Zhuk-M, which has a planar array antenna rather than a dish, improving range, and a much superior processing ability, with multiple-target engagement capability and compatibility with the Vympel R-77 (or RVV-AE).

=== Armament ===
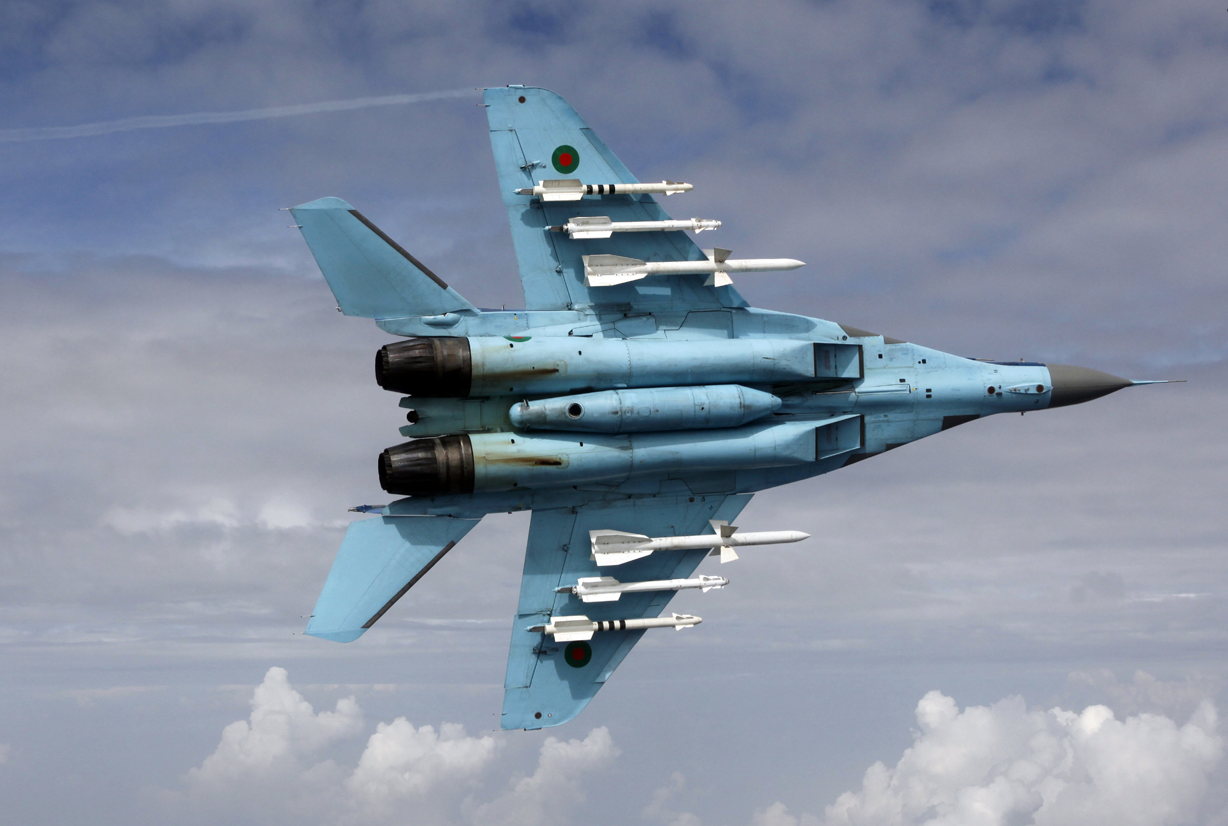
Bangladesh Air Force MiG-29 showing its full underbelly. Note the six underwing pylons carrying R-27 and R-73 air-to-air missiles. The centerline fuel tank is seen with an APU exhaust duct.

Armament for the MiG-29 includes a single GSh-30-1 30 mm (1.18 in) cannon in the port wing root. This originally had a 150-round magazine, which was reduced to 100 rounds in later variants, which only allows a few seconds of firing before running out of ammo. Original production MiG-29 aircraft cannot fire the cannon when carrying a centerline fuel tank as it blocks the shell ejection port. This was corrected in the MiG-29S and later versions.

Three pylons are provided under each wing (four in some variants), for a total of six (or eight). The inboard pylons can carry either a 1,150 L (250 imp gal; 300 US gal) fuel tank, one Vympel R-27 (AA-10 "Alamo") medium-range air-to-air missile, or unguided bombs or rockets. Some Soviet aircraft could carry a single nuclear bomb on the port inboard station. The outer pylons usually carry R-73 (AA-11 "Archer") dogfight air to air missiles, although some users still retain the older R-60 (AA-8 "Aphid"). A single 1,500 L (330 imp gal; 400 US gal) tank can be fitted to the centerline, between the engines.

The US has supplied AGM-88 HARM missiles to Ukraine. It appears that they are fired from MiG-29s. It was only disclosed after Russian forces showed footage of a tail fin from one of these missiles. U.S. Under Secretary of Defense for Policy Colin Kahl has said this: "I would just point to two things. One, you know, a lot was made about the MiG-29 issue several months ago, not very much has been noticed about the sheer amount of spare parts and other things that we've done to help them actually put more of their own MiG-29s in the air and keep those that are in the air flying for a longer period of time. And then also, in recent PDA [Presidential Drawdown Authority] packages we've included a number of anti-radiation missiles that can be fired off of Ukrainian aircraft. They can have effects on Russian radars and other things." Soviet era aircraft don't have the computer architecture to accept NATO standard weapons. The interface would be difficult; however with a "crude modification", such as an e-tablet, it would be possible.

== Operational history ==
While the MiG-29's true capabilities could only be estimated from the time it first appeared in 1977 until the mid-1980s, a combination of persistent intelligence and increasing access afforded by the Soviet foreign sales effort allowed a true appreciation of its capabilities. Early MiG-29s were very agile aircraft, capable of rivaling the performance of contemporary F-18 and F-16 aircraft. However, their relatively low fuel capacity relegated them to short-range air defense missions. Lacking HOTAS and an inter-aircraft data link, and requiring a very intensive "heads-down" approach to operating cockpit controls, the early MiG-29 denied pilots the kind of situational awareness routinely enjoyed by pilots operating comparable US aircraft. Analysts and Western pilots who flew examples of the MiG-29 thought this likely prevented even very good pilots from harnessing the plane's full combat capability. Later MiG-29s were upgraded to improve their capabilities. The Soviet Union exported MiG-29s to several countries. Because 4th-generation fighter aircraft require the pilots to have extensive training, air-defense infrastructure, and constant maintenance and upgrades, MiG-29s have had mixed operational history with different air forces.

=== Soviet Union and successor states ===
==== Soviet service ====
The MiG-29 was first publicly seen in the West when the Soviet Union displayed the aircraft in Finland on 2 July 1986. Two MiG-29s were also displayed at the Farnborough Airshow in Britain in September 1988. The following year, the aircraft conducted flying displays at the 1989 Paris Air Show where it was involved in a non-fatal crash during the first weekend of the show. The Paris Air Show display was only the second display of Soviet fighters at an international air show since the 1930s. Western observers were impressed by its apparent capability and exceptional agility.

The only claimed combat service of the MiG-29 in Soviet service was in 1987 and 1988, where they were deployed the 115th GvIAP to Termez Airfield in Turkmenistan in 1987 to cover for Soviet forces in Afghanistan, especially Kabul. This apparently proved effective as - sources disagree about whether it was in August or September - four SU-22M3s of the DRAAF defected and attempted to bomb the capital but were all shot down within minutes of each other by the Fulcrums, though this incident is heavily disputed. The Fulcrums of the 115th GvIAP were however, used to overfly and interrupt two unidentified Afghans who had crossed the Soviet border and were constructing a hut on an islet in the Pyandzh River. Following the disintegration of the Soviet Union, most of the MiG-29s entered service with the newly formed Russian Air Force.

==== Russia ====
The sketch of the MiG-29 performing the super maneuver, the Pugachev's Cobra

In July 1993, two MiG-29s of the Russian Air Force collided in mid-air and crashed away from the public at the Royal International Air Tattoo. No one on the ground sustained any serious injuries, and the two pilots ejected and landed safely.

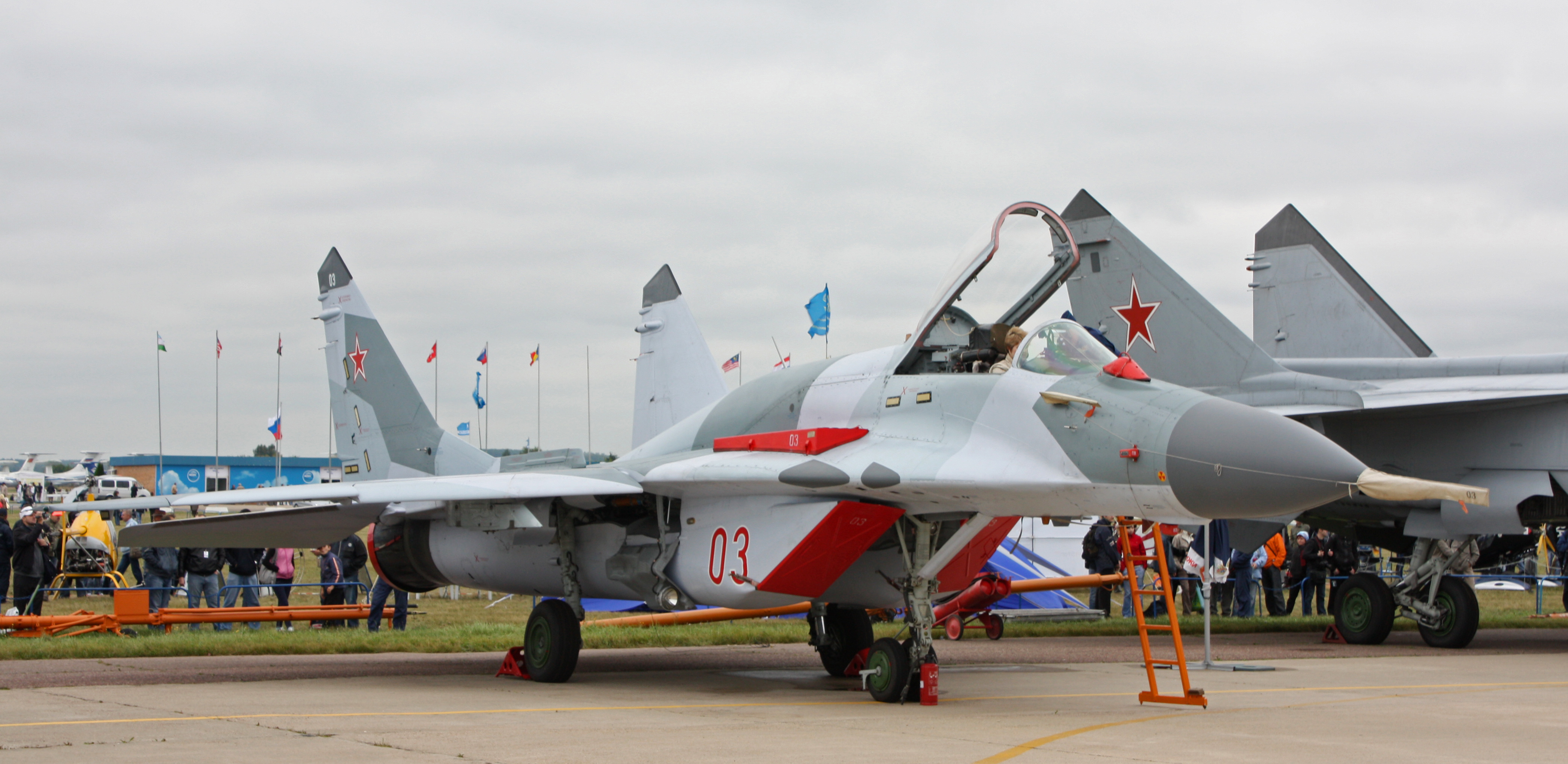
MiG-29SMT at the 2011 MAKS

The Russian Air Force grounded all its MiG-29s following a crash in Siberia on 17 October 2008. Following a second crash with a MiG-29 in east Siberia in December 2008, Russian officials admitted that most MiG-29 fighters in the Russian Air Force were incapable of performing combat duties due to poor maintenance. The age of the aircraft was also an important factor as about 70% of the MiGs were considered to be too old to take to the skies. The Russian MiG-29s had not received updates since the collapse of the Soviet Union. On 4 February 2009, the Russian Air Force resumed flights with the MiG-29. However, in March 2009, 91 MiG-29s of the Russian Air Force required repair after inspections due to corrosion; approximately 100 MiGs were cleared to continue flying at the time. The Russian Aerospace Forces started an update of its early MiG-29s to the more current MiG-29SMT standard, but financial difficulties prevented delivery of more than three MiG-29 SMT upgrade to the Russian Aerospace Forces. Instead, the 35 MiG-29SMT/UBTs rejected by Algeria were bought by the Russian Aerospace Forces. Russia placed an order for 16 new-build MiG-29SMTs on 15 April 2014, with delivery expected by 2017.

On 4 June 2015, a MiG-29 crashed during training in Astrakhan. A month later, another MiG-29 crashed near the village of Kushchevskaya in the Krasnodar region with the pilot safely ejecting. A series of accidents in the Russian Aerospace Forces that happened in 2015 were caused mostly by overall increase of flights and training.

===== 2008 Georgian drone shootdown =====
On 20 April 2008, Georgian officials claimed a Russian MiG-29 shot down a Georgian Hermes 450 unmanned aerial vehicle and provided video footage from the ill-fated drone showing an apparent MiG-29 launching an air-to-air missile at it. Russia denies that the aircraft was theirs and says they did not have any pilots in the air that day. Abkhazia's administration claimed its own forces shot down the drone with an L-39 aircraft "because it was violating Abkhaz airspace and breaching ceasefire agreements." UN investigation concluded that the video was authentic and that the drone was shot down by a Russian MiG-29 or Su-27 using an R-73 heat seeking missile.

===== Russian intervention in Syria =====
Following the deployment of the Kuznetsov aircraft carrier off the Syrian Coast, MiG-29Ks from the carrier air wing took part in operations against insurgent forces in the country. On the 13th of November 2016, one of these MiG-29Ks crashed after running out of fuel while waiting for repair on the landing systems aboard the ship. The pilot was rescued by a Russian helicopter after ejecting.

During the first half of September 2017, the Russian Aerospace Forces deployed some MiG-29SMT multirole combat aircraft to Khmeimim Airbase, near Latakia, in western Syria, becoming the first time the modernized version of the baseline Fulcrum jet was deployed to take part in the Syrian Air War. The MiG-29SMT were involved in bombing missions and secondary strategic bombers escort duties of Russian and Syrian aircraft.

===== Russian invasion of Ukraine =====
On 16 July 2014, a Ukrainian Su-25 was shot down, with Ukrainian officials stating that a Russian MiG-29 shot it down using a R-27T missile. Russia denied these allegations.

Following the 2022 Russian Invasion of Ukraine, Russia has not used MiG-29s in a large scale, with little evidence of their use in publicly available information. Ukrainian forces claim to have destroyed a MiG-29 at Kacha Airfield in Crimea on the 4th of December 2025 using a long range drone launched by the "Ghosts" Special Forces Unit. Images released by Ukrainian forces indicate that it was a MiG-29K, though it is unclear if it was a decoy or even if it was operational.

==== Kazakhstan ====
Kazakhstan inherited a large amount of the Soviet Union's stockpiles, including at least 12 MiG-29As (Project 9.12s) and two MiG-29UBs of the 715th Fighter Aviation Regiment based at Loogovaya Airbase. In 1995, the newly re-organized Kazak Air Defense Forces ordered 22 more Fulcrums from Russia, including at least 18 single seat fighters (Project 9.12s) and four trainers. Between 1995 and 1996, at least two airframes were reportedly sold onto Yemen. MiG-29s were retired from active Kazakh service in 2023, when around 23 were still believed to be active and have since been offered for sale by the government. A number of sources claimed that these aircraft, alongside other former Soviet types such as the MiG-31, were sold to the United States either to be used as an aggressor type or to be transferred to Ukraine, with the Kazakh government denying this and clarifying that the auction was only open to local entities.

==== Turkmenistan ====
Turkmenistan inherited a number of MiG-29s from the Soviet Union, especially those based within its borders with these aircraft being originally from the 1521st Detachment at the Maryy-1 Airbase until their disbandment in 1993. They were then re-organized into the 67th Composite Air Regiment of the Turkmen Air Force at the Maryy-2 Airbase. A total of 24 airframes are believed to have been inherited: 10 MiG-29As (9.12 airframes), 12 MiG-29Cs (9.13 airframes) and two MiG-29UBs.

==== Ukraine ====
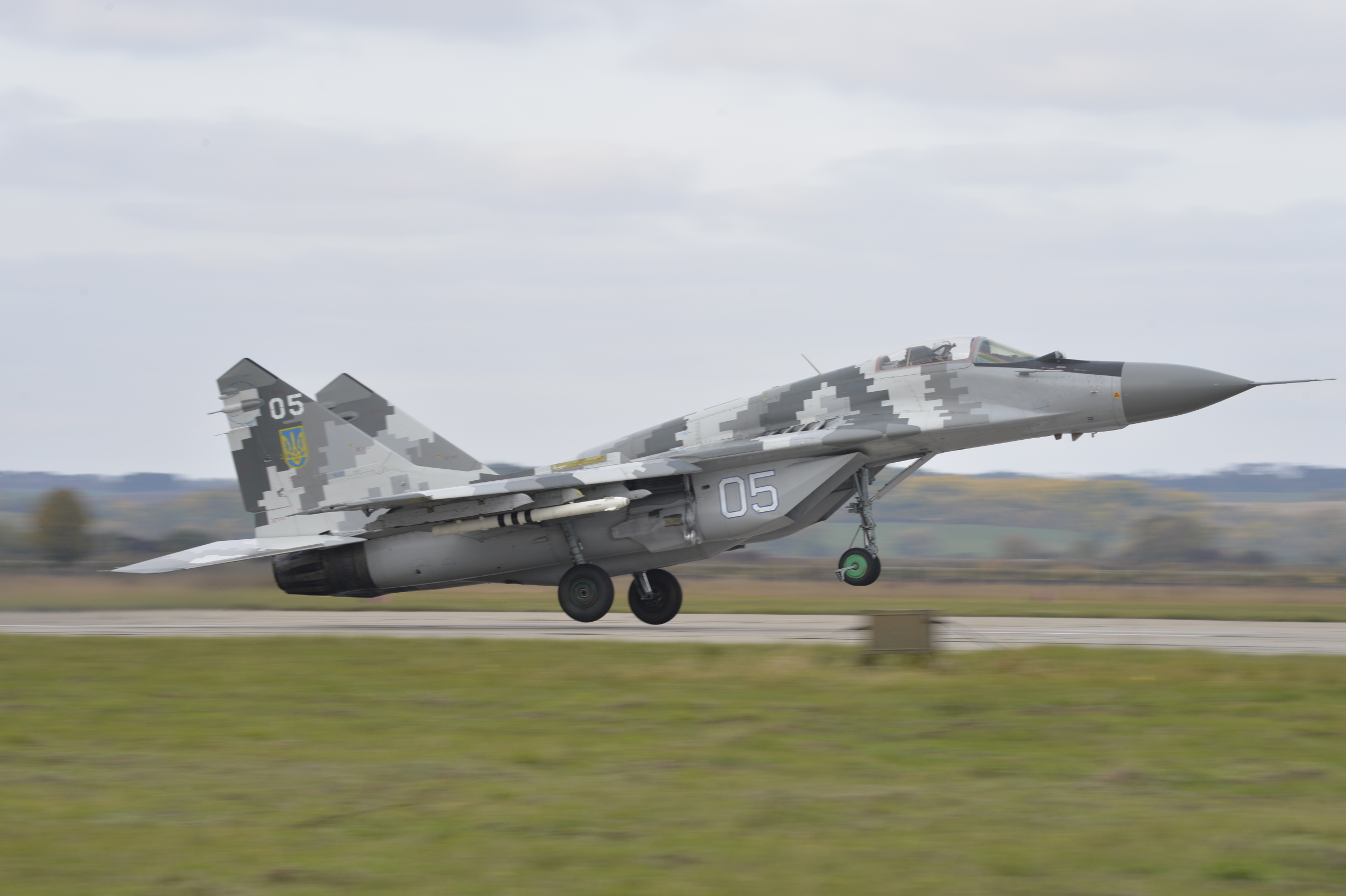
A Ukrainian MiG-29, 2018

Ukraine inherited up to 240 from the Soviet Union in 1991, but over the years several were withdrawn from service, sold to other countries, while others were handed over to museums. Until 2011, approximately 70−80 aircraft were used by the 9th, 40th, 114th, and 204th Brigades, though fewer than 20 were fully mission capable on average. In 2019, it was estimated that Ukraine had only 37 combat ready MiG-29s. After the Russian invasion in February 2022, three Azerbaijani Air Force MiG-29s undergoing overhauls were transferred to the Ukrainian Air Force, bolstering the total of aircraft operated by the 40th and 204th Tactical Aviation Brigades from around 55 to 58.

===== Russian invasions of Ukraine =====
In April 2014, during the Russian invasion of Crimea, 45 Ukrainian Air Force MiG-29s and 4 L-39 combat trainers were reportedly captured by Russian forces at Belbek air base. Most of the planes appeared to be in inoperable condition. In May, Russian troops dismantled them and shipped them back to Ukraine. On 4 August 2014, the Ukrainian government stated that a number of them had been put back into service to fight in the war in the east of the country.

During the initial days of the war in Donbas in April 2014, the Ukrainian Air Force deployed some jet fighters over the Donetsk region to perform combat air patrols and show of force flights. Probably due to the limited number of jet fighters available, a MiG-29 belonging to the Ukrainian Falcons display team was spotted armed with a full air-to-air load and performing a low altitude fly by. In the evening of 7 August 2014, a Ukrainian Air Force MiG-29MU1, bort number 02 Blue, was shot down by an antiaircraft missile fired by pro-Russian rebels near the town of Yenakievo, and exploded in midair. The pilot ejected safely. On 17 August 2014, another Ukrainian Air Force MiG-29, bort number 53 White, tasked with air to ground duties against separatists' positions was shot down by pro-Russian rebels in the Luhansk region. The Ukrainian government confirmed the downing. The pilot ejected safely and was recovered by friendly forces.

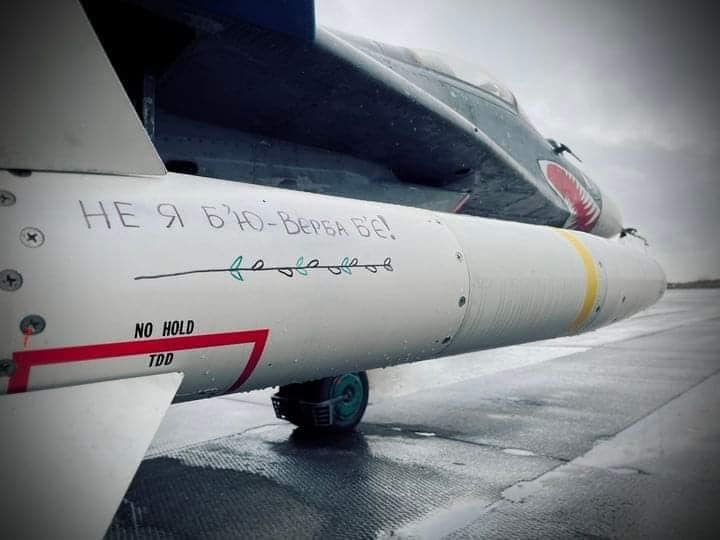
A MiG-29 armed with an AGM-88 HARM missile

As of 2018, the Lviv State Aircraft Repair Plant began domestically upgrading the MiG-29 to have multirole capability, known as the MiG-29MU2. Development was expected to be completed by 2019 and enter production in 2020. The first upgraded MiG-29 was delivered to the Ukrainian Air Force in July 2020. On 29 May 2020, Ukrainian MiG-29s took part in the Bomber Task Force in Europe with American B-1B bombers for the first time in the Black Sea region. In September 2020, B-52 bombers from the 5th Bomb Wing conducted vital integration training with Ukrainian MiG-29s and Su-27s inside Ukraine's airspace.

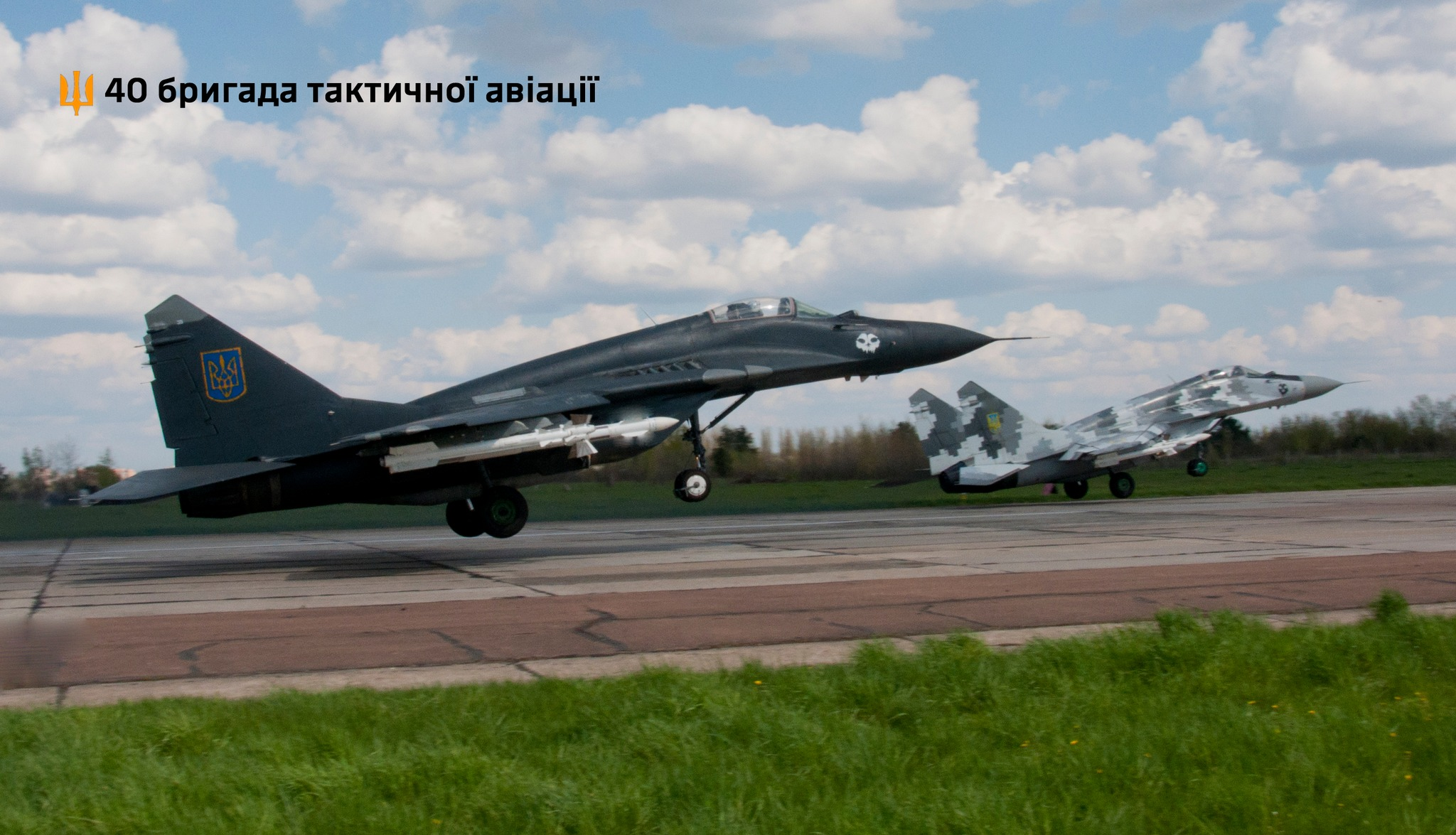
MiG-29s of the 40th Tactical Aviation Brigade, 2023

During the Russian invasion of Ukraine, Su-27s and MiG-29s were used as air superiority fighters, with ten MiG-29s reported lost on the ground and in the air. In August 2022, a senior U.S. defense official disclosed that the Ukrainians have integrated the AGM-88 HARM missile onto their "MiG aircraft" with video evidence of AGM-88 missiles fired by upgraded Ukrainian MiG-29s released by the Ukrainian Air Force few days later. For a weapon that relies on digital display to fire, the question of how it has been integrated into the MiG-29's analogue displays remains unanswered. The footage shows a commercial GPS having been installed along with a tablet of some kind.

On 13 October 2022, a Ukrainian MiG-29 crashed during a combat mission. Its pilot is claimed to have destroyed a Shahed-136 drone with his cannon, and it is believed the debris from the drone collided with the aircraft and forced the pilot to eject. Ukrainian sources claim that the pilot shot down five drones and two cruise missiles shortly before the crash. The downed MiG-29 was wearing a livery similar to that of the Ukrainian Falcons display team. According to the Ukrainian State Bureau of Investigation: "the jet collided with debris from a destroyed drone, which caused massive damage to it to the point where it crashed near a village in northeast Vinnytsia. The pilot managed to eject and is currently receiving treatment in the hospital." On 20 September 2023, a Ukrainian Air Force MiG-29 was struck by a ZALA Lancet drone at the Dolgintsevo air base near Kryvyi Rih. A second drone was used as a spotter, recording the first Lancet's impact. Another Ukrainian MiG-29 was lost in Odesa Oblast on 10 August 2026, after the aircraft caught fire following the launch of an air-to-air missile while attempting to intercept Russian aerial targets. The pilot ejected successfully and was taken for medical treatment. As of 11 August 2026, 35 Ukrainian MiG-29s have been destroyed (four on the ground) and three have been damaged (two on the ground) by Russian forces.

On 1 October 2026, a Russian missile shot down a Ukrainian MiG-29, killing the pilot, Captain Marat Redvanovych Mambetov, over "eastern Ukraine" during a combat mission. At the time he was the flight commander of the 40th Tactical Aviation Brigade.

==== Uzbekistan ====
Uzbekistan inherited 30 single seat (MiG-29As or Cs) and six dual trainers from the Soviet Union following the breakup of the Union. These fighters were originally under the 115th IAP at Kodaidy near Afghanistan (where they were used to provide aircover for the Soviet Forces in Afghanistan) but were re-organized in 1993 to form the 61st Fighter Air Brigade, with new three tone camouflage and Air Force titles. As of 2026, 26 single seat and five dual seat airframes are in service, however the airframes are aging and Uzbekistan is seeking a replacement for their Fulcrums and other Soviet-era jets with the Uzbek Minister of Defense, Major General Shukhrat Kholmukhamedov, confirmed the order of new Chinese jets in 2025 with deliveries allegedly having been conducted that year itself.

=== Export ===
==== India ====
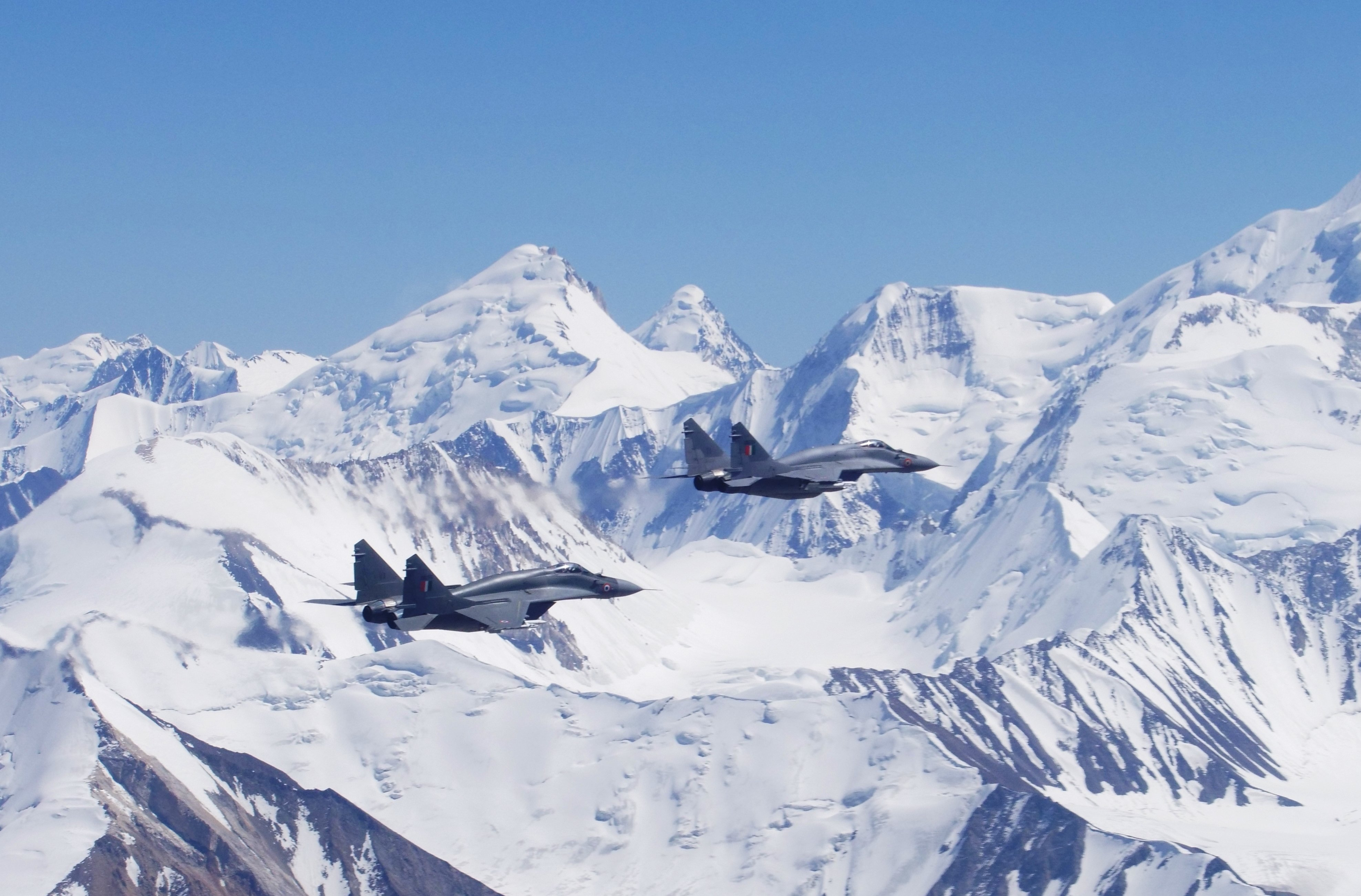
Indian Air Force MiG-29UPGs flying over the Himalayas

India was the first international customer of the MiG-29, outside of the Warsaw Pact. Despite preference for additional procurement of French made Mirage 2000s for the Indian Air Force (IAF), the Indian government opted for Soviet made MiG-29s. India placed an order for 44 aircraft (40 single-seat MiG-29 9.12Bs and four twin-seat MiG-29UBs) in 1984, and the aircraft was officially inducted into the IAF in 1987. IAF MiG-29s were equipped with the N019 “Slot Back” radar, R-27, R-60 and R-73 missiles. In 1989, an additional order for 20 aircraft was placed, with ten more MiG-29s added in 1994. Since its acquisition, the aircraft has undergone a series of modifications with the addition of new avionics, subsystems, turbofan engines and radars. India signed a US$888 million deal with Russia in 2005–06 to upgrade all of its MiG-29s, to extend their operational life by 10–15 years. The upgrade program was planned to be completed in four years, and consisted of retrofitting the aircraft with upgraded avionics including replacing the N-019 radar with Phazatron Zhuk-M radar. Under the deal, the aircraft were also modified to be capable of deploying the R-77 missiles, and enabling mid air refueling to increase endurance. In 2007, Hindustan Aeronautics Limited (HAL) was given a license to manufacture 120 RD-33 series 3 turbofan engines for the upgrade.

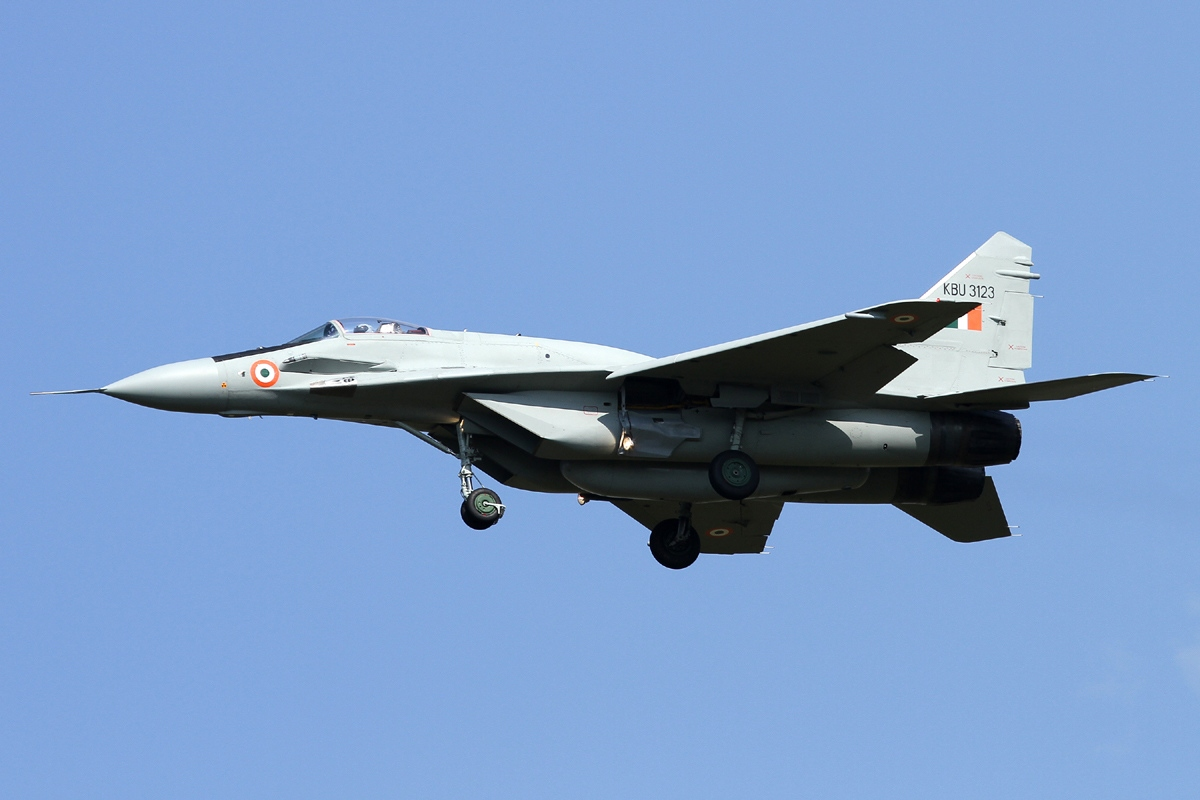
An upgraded MiG-29UPG of the Indian Air Force

In March 2008, India signed a renewed agreement with Russia worth $960 million for upgrading its existing fleet of 69 MiG-29s, which would enable them to operate for another 25 to 40 years. The upgrades to Indian MiG-29s will be to the MiG-29UPG standard, the first six MiG-29s were to be upgraded in Russia with the remaining 63 MiGs to be upgraded by HAL in India. The upgrades included a new weapon control system, improved cockpit ergonomics, DRDO/DARE D-29 electronic warfare system, and upgraded weaponry including air-to-ground missiles and guided bombs. India also awarded a contract to Israel Aircraft Industries to provide avionics and subsystems for the upgrade. India sent the first six of its aircraft to Russia for upgrades in 2008. The first three aircraft were delivered to India in December 2012, more than two years behind schedule. In March 2009, the IAF expressed concern about the aircraft after 90 Russian MiG-29s were grounded after a crash. In March 2009, the IAF cleared all MiG-29s in its fleet as safe after an extensive inspection. In a disclosure to the Indian Parliament, the Indian Defence Minister said structural flaws had been identified in the MiG-29s with the possibility of cracks developing in the tail fin due to corrosion. After Russia shared the finding with India, which emerged after the crash of a Russian Air Force MiG-29 in December 2008, a repair and maintenance program was put in place to resolve the issue.

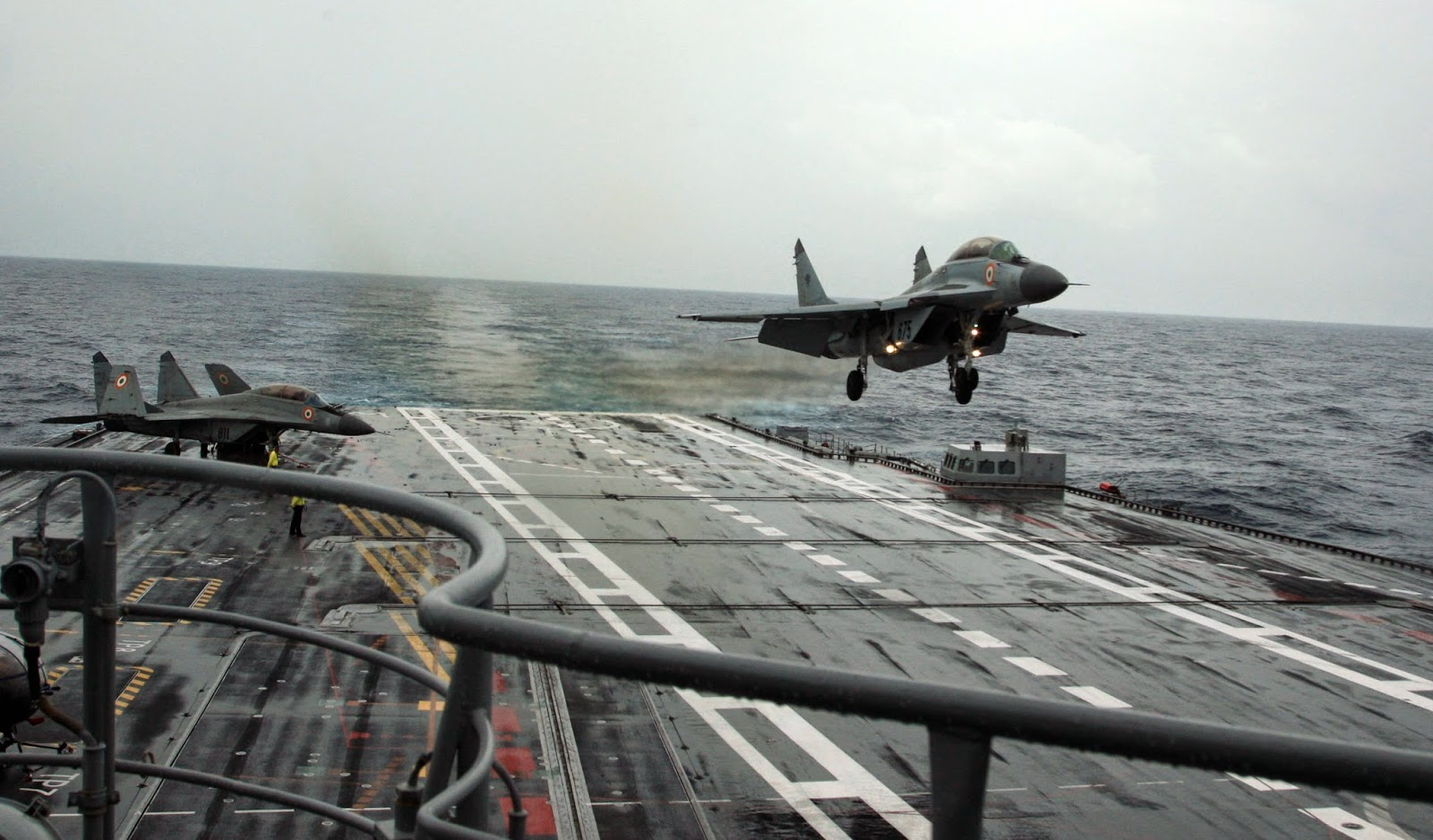
An Indian Navy MiG-29K landing on INS Vikramaditya

In 2004, India had signed a deal for the acquisition of additional 16 MiG-29Ks for the Indian Navy, to be deployed on INS Vikramaditya, the refurbished aircraft carrier to be purchased from Russia. In January 2010, India and Russia signed a US$1.2 billion deal for the acquisition of additional 29 MiG-29Ks for the Indian Navy, bringing the total number of MiG-29Ks on order to 45. The MiG-29K entered service with the Indian Navy on 19 February 2010.

By September 2019, the fleet of 69 IAF MiG-29s were upgraded to UPG standard. The upgrade project involved 6 aircraft being upgraded in Russia and the remaining fleet at the 11th Base Repair and Depot facilities at Ojhar , which have been increasingly used to maintain the IAF's fleet of MiG-29s and Su-30MKIs. In 2020, India planned an additional order of 21 MiG-29s, which would be manufactured from airframes built in late 1980s but never assembled, and upgraded before delivery to the Indian Air Force. On 7 August 2024, IAF issued a request for proposal to upgrade 24 MiG-29s to integrate High Speed Low Drag Bombs with a range of 180 km (110 mi). The upgrade would include installation of hardware such as bomb racks on external hardpoints, and necessary software for the aircraft, with the entire MiG-29 fleet to be modified in phases.

The Indian Armed Forces have lost about 25 MiG-29 aircraft from 1989 to 2025 due to accidents and other incidents. As of 2026, the Indian Air Force has 65 MiG-29UPGs and 10 MiG-29B trainers, while the Indian Navy has 36 MiG-29Ks and nine MiG-29KUB trainers in service. In early 2026, the IAF proposed to equip its MiG-29s with ASRAAM missiles to replace its older R-73 missiles. The ministry of defence invited bids for integrating the missiles onboard 56 MiG-29s, including eight twin-seater variants, with the project proposed to be executed at the 11 Base Repair Depot (BRD) at Nashik.

On 8 January 2026, Astra Rafael Cosmys, a joint venture between Hyderabad-based Astra Microwave Products and Rafael Advanced Defense Systems, announced that they were awarded a contract worth ₹275.27 crore (US$29 million) from the Indian Air Force for avionics and network-centric upgrades of its fighter fleet. The contract included the integration of software-defined radios (SDR) and installation of network-centric operations (NCO) onto the MiG-29 fleet, including 29 fighters and 7 trainers, as well as the supply of 24 SDR units for HAL Tejas Mk1A aircraft. The contract would be executed within 12 months. The integration of SDR was initiated for the MiG-29 fleet in July. According to reports, the SDR includes Netcor 1 and 2 systems connected through MIL-STD-1553 bus for NCO capability. The project will be undertaken across 8 batches for over 18 months at 11 BRD, AFS Adampur and AFS Srinagar.

===== Kargil War =====
MiG-29s were extensively used by the IAF during the Kargil War with Pakistan in 1999. They were used to provide escort for the Mirage 2000s attacking targets with laser-guided bombs.

===== Balakot strike =====
Indian MiG-29s were scrambled to intercept PAF aircraft during the Pakistani counter-strike after India struck a target in Pakistan in February 2019.

===== Operation Sindoor =====
During the 2025 India–Pakistan conflict, MiG-29s were deployed on forward bases and participated in the operation. The Indian Navy also deployed 15 MiG-29Ks aboard the aircraft carrier INS Vikrant in the Arabian Sea in case hostilities expanded.

==== Yugoslavia and Serbia ====
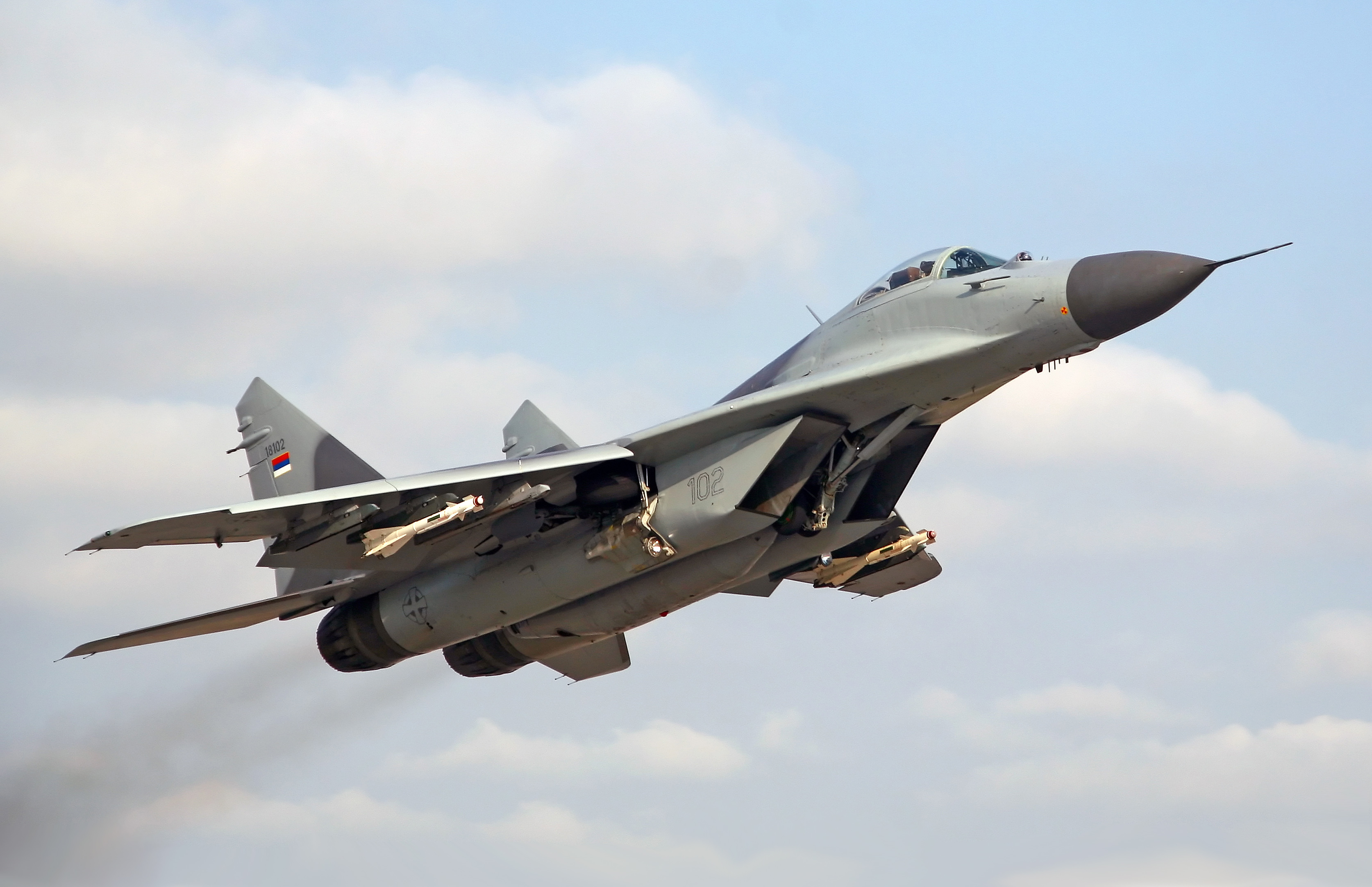
MiG-29 of the Serbian Air Force and Air Defence

Yugoslavia was the first European country outside the Soviet Union to operate the MiG-29. The country received 14 MiG-29s (9.12A) and two MiG-29UBs from the USSR in 1987 and 1988. The MiG-29s were put into service with the 127th Fighter Aviation Squadron, based at Batajnica Air Base, north of Belgrade, Serbia.

Yugoslav MiG-29s saw little combat during the breakup of Yugoslavia, and were used primarily for ground attacks. Several Antonov An-2 aircraft used by Croatia were destroyed on the ground at Čepin airfield near Osijek, Croatia in 1991 by a Yugoslav MiG-29, with no MiG-29 losses. At least two MiG-29s carried out an airstrike on Banski Dvori, the official residence of the Croatian Government, on 7 October 1991.

The MiG-29s continued their service in the subsequent Federal Republic of Yugoslavia. Because of the United Nations arms embargo against the country, the condition of the MiG-29s worsened as aircraft were not maintained according to rules and general overhaul scheduled for 1996 and 1997 was not conducted.

Six MiG-29s were shot down during the NATO intervention in the Kosovo War, four by USAF F-15s, one by a USAF F-16, and one by a Royal Netherlands Air Force F-16. However, one aircraft, according to its pilot, was hit by friendly fire from the ground. Another four were destroyed on the ground. One Argentine source claims that a MiG-29 shot down an F-16 on 26 March 1999, but this kill is disputed, as the F-16C in question was said to have crashed in the US that same day.

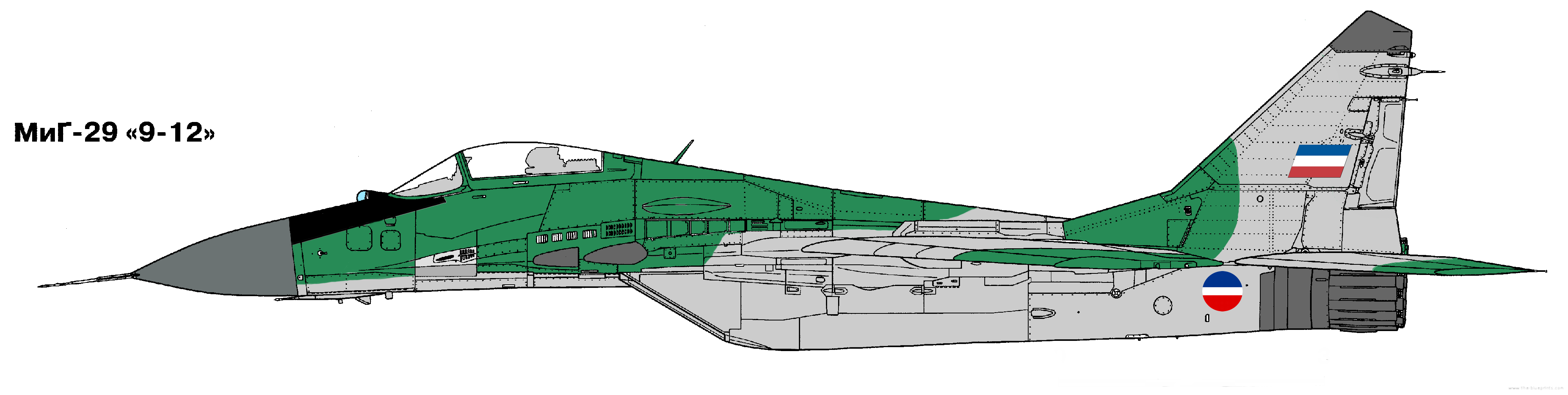
A digital representation of a MiG-29 (9.12A) in service with the Yugoslav Air Force during Operation Allied Force in 1999

The Air Force of Serbia and Montenegro continued flying its remaining five MiG-29s at a very low rate after the war. In the spring of 2004, news appeared that MiG-29 operations had ceased, because the aircraft could not be maintained, but later the five remaining airframes were sent to Russia for overhaul. In July 2009, a Serbian Air Force MiG-29 crashed over Belgrade. The small Serbian MiG-29 fleet along with other jets were grounded for four months during the summer of 2014 due to a battery procurement issue.

In November 2016, Russia had agreed to donate six of its MiG-29s free of charge, if Serbia would pay the repair costs of $50 million for them. At the end of January 2017, Serbian defense minister Zoran Đorđević said that Belarus also agreed to donate eight of its MiG-29s to Serbia on a no-pay basis. In early October 2017, Russia completed the delivery of all the six MiG-29s. The aircraft were transferred to Serbia on board an Antonov An-124 transport aircraft. On 25 February 2019, Belarus formally handed four MiG-29s to the Serbian military during a ceremony held at the 558th Aircraft Repair Plant in Baranavichy. This increased the Serbian Air Force's fleet to 14 MiG-29s. Serbia plans to spend about €180–230 million on modernization of its entire MiG-29 fleet. As of 2021, the Serbian Air Force operates 14 MiG-29s. Images taken in March 2026 showed Serbian MiG-29s using LS6 Precision Guided Bombs (a conversion kit for unguided bombs) and the CM-400 Air to Surface Missile which were previously integrated.

==== Germany ====
East Germany bought 24 MiG-29s (20 MiG-29As, four MiG-29UBs), which entered service in 1988–1989 in 1./JG3 "Wladimir Komarow" in Preschen in Brandenburg. After the fall of the Berlin Wall in November 1989 and reunification of Germany in October 1990, the MiG-29s and other aircraft of the East German Air Forces of the National People's Army were integrated into the West German Luftwaffe. Initially the 1./JG3 kept its designation. In April 1991 both 1./JG3's MiG-29 squadrons were reorganised into the MiG-29 test wing ("Erprobungsgeschwader MiG-29"), which became JG73 "Steinhoff" and was transferred to Laage near Rostock in June 1993.

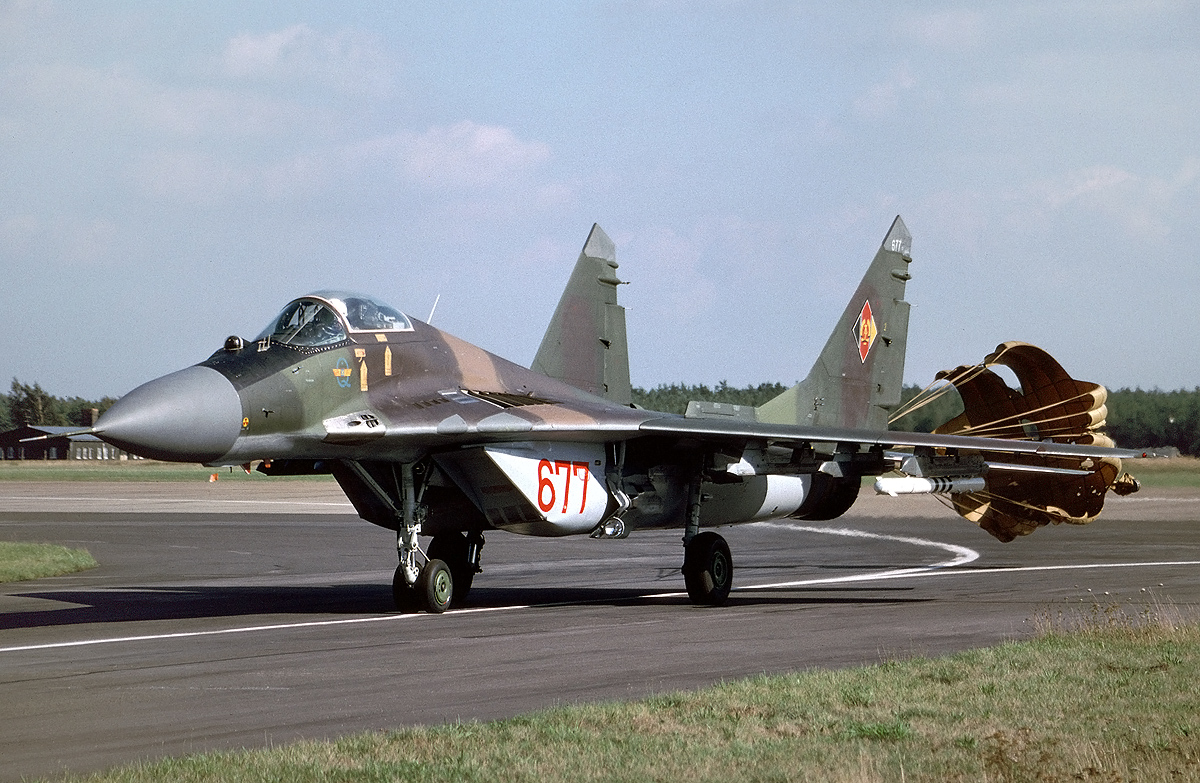
East German MiG-29 operating at Preschen in 1990

The Federation of American Scientists claims the MiG-29 is equal to, or better than the F-15C in short aerial engagements because of the Helmet Mounted Weapons Sight (HMS) and better maneuverability at slow speeds.This was demonstrated when MiG-29s of the German Air Force participated in joint DACT exercises with US fighters. The HMS was a great help, allowing the Germans to achieve a lock on any target the pilot could see within the missile field of view, including those almost 45 degrees off boresight. However, the German pilots who flew the MiG-29 admitted that while the Fulcrum was more maneuverable at slow speeds than the F-15 Eagle, F-16 Fighting Falcon, F-14 Tomcat, and F/A-18 Hornet and its Vympel R-73 dogfight missile system was superior to the AIM-9 Sidewinder of the time, in engagements that went into the beyond visual range arena, the German pilots found it difficult to multi-task locking and firing the MiG-29's Vympel R-27 missile (German MiG-29s did not have access to the more advanced Vympel R-77 that equips more advanced MiG-29 versions) while trying to avoid the longer range and advanced search and track capabilities of the American fighters' radars and AIM-120 AMRAAM. The Germans also stated that the American fighters had the advantage in both night and bad weather combat conditions. The Luftwaffe's assessment of the MiG-29 was that the Fulcrum was best used as a point defense interceptor over cities and military installations, not for fighter sweeps over hostile airspace. This assessment ultimately led Germany to not deploy its MiG-29s in the Kosovo War during Operation Allied Force, though Luftwaffe pilots who flew the MiG-29 admitted that even if they were permitted to fly combat missions over the former Yugoslavia they would have been hampered by the lack of NATO-specific communication tools and identification friend or foe systems.

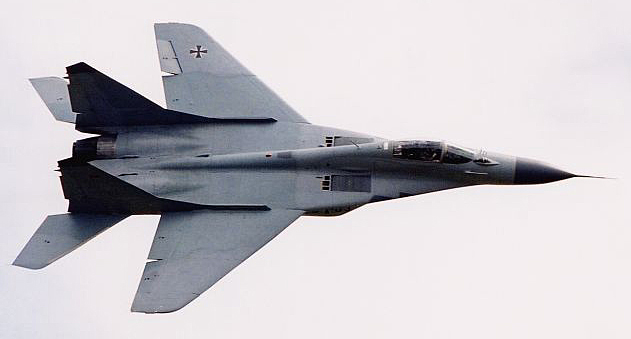
German Air Force MiG-29

Beginning in 1993, the German MiGs were stationed with JG73 "Steinhoff" in Laage near Rostock. During the service in the German Air Force, one MiG-29 ("29+09") was destroyed in an accident on 25 June 1996 due to pilot error. By 2003, German Air Force pilots had flown over 30,000 hours in the MiG-29. In September 2003, 22 of the 23 remaining machines were sold to the Polish Air Force for the symbolic price of €1 per item. The last aircraft were transferred in August 2004. The 23rd MiG-29 ("29+03") was put on display at Laage.

==== Libya ====
In the second half of the 1980s, the Soviet Union offered the MiG-29 to Libya. The offer was turned down, as the weapons system and radar of the MiG-29 were assessed as similar to those of the MiG-23MLD already in service with the Libyan Arab Air Force. The MiG-29's price was also deemed much too high.

===== Libyan Civil War =====
In 2020, it was reported that MiG-29 aircraft were flown by forces aligned with Khalifa Haftar in Libya. On 11 September 2020, United States Africa Command stated that two MiG-29s, operated by Russian speaking personnel, crashed in Libya for unknown reasons, the first on 28 June 2020, the second on 7 September 2020. These were operated by Wagner Group and crashed near Sirte, Libya. It was announced that MiG-29s and Su-24s are to be delivered to the Libyan Air Force from Russia.

==== Peru ====
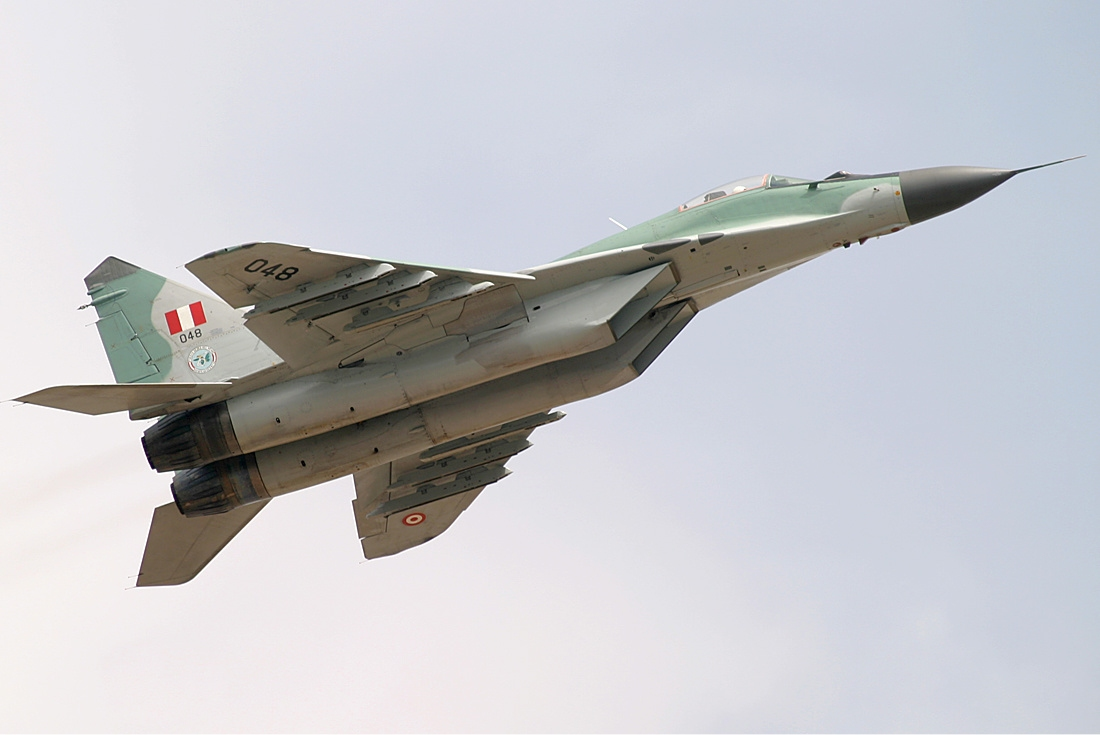
MiG-29SE of the Peruvian Air Force

The Peruvian Air Force acquired 21 MiG-29S fighters from Belarus in 1996, as part of a package that also included 18 Su-25 attack aircraft. The following year, an additional 3 MiG-29 aircraft were acquired from Russia. At the same time, Peru contracted with Mikoyan to upgrade 8 aircraft to the MiG-29SMP standard, with an option to upgrade the remainder of the Peruvian inventory. Peru contracted RAC MiG to overhaul and upgrade 19 of its MiG-29s in August 2008 for a contract valued at 106 million dollars, but the process was delayed when technicians found the jets were in worse condition than expected upon arrival in Peru. The first eight of these jets were delivered in 2012 and are expected to last for 20 years. The Peruvian MiG-29s are based at FAP Captain José Abelardo Quiñones González International Airport in northern Peru, equipping Escuadrón Aéreo 612 (Fighter Squadron 612 "Fighting Roosters").

==== Poland ====
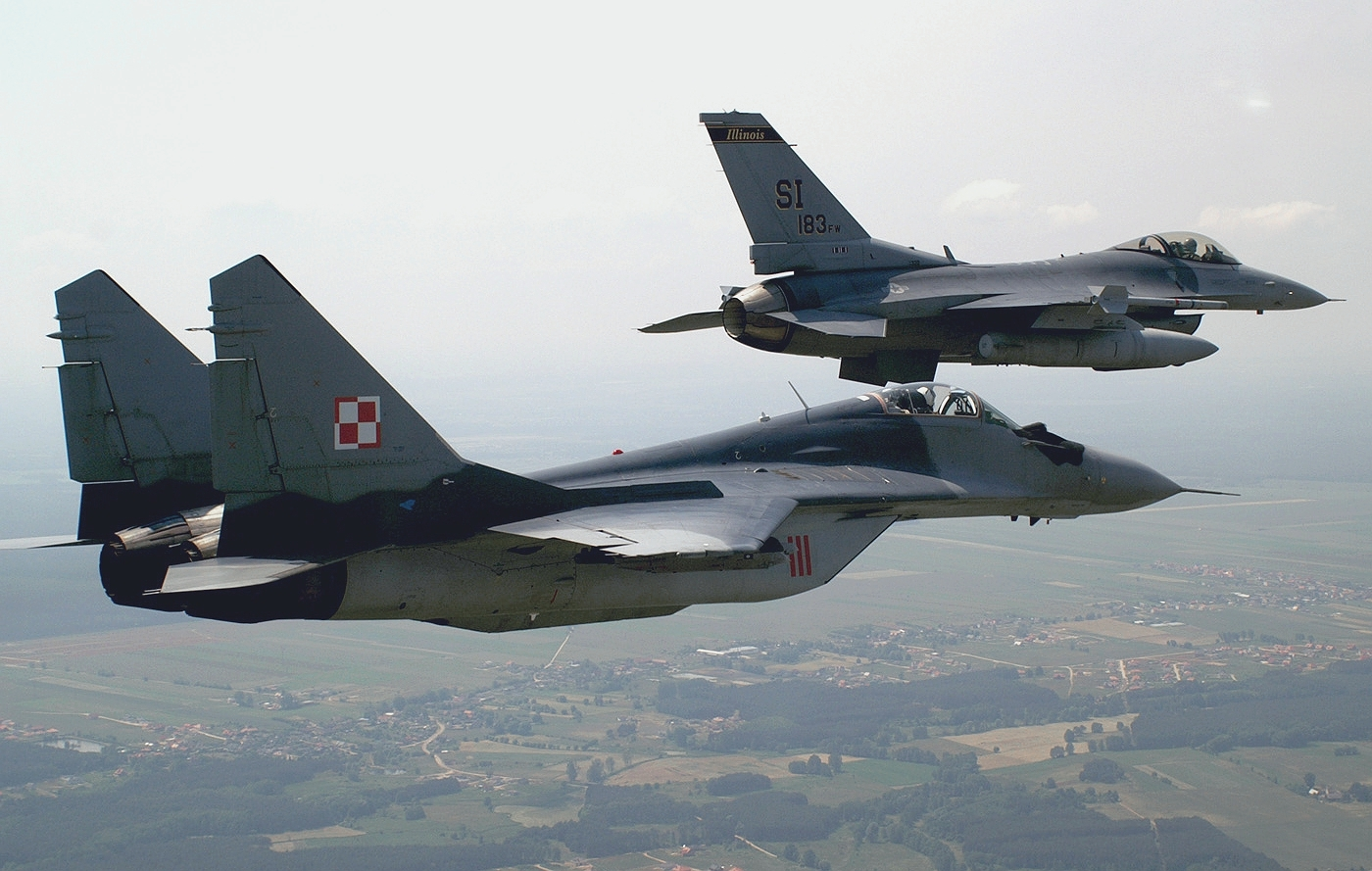
A Polish Air Force MiG-29 with a USAF F-16

The first 12 MiG-29s delivered to Poland were nine MiG-29As and three MiG-29UBs in 1989–1990. The aircraft were based at Mińsk Mazowiecki and used by the 1st Fighter Aviation Regiment, which was reorganized in 2001 as 1 Eskadra Lotnictwa Taktycznego (1. elt), or 1st Tactical Squadron (TS). In 1995–1996, 10 used examples were acquired from the Czech Republic (nine MiG-29As, one MiG-29UB). After the retirement of its MiG-23s in 1999, and MiG-21s in 2004, Poland was left for a time with only these 22 MiG-29s in the interceptor role.

Of the 22 MiG-29s Poland received from the German Air Force in 2004, a total of 14 were overhauled and taken into service. They were used to equip the 41st Tactical Squadron (41. elt), replacing its MiG-21s. As of 2008, Poland was the biggest NATO MiG-29 user. Poland had 31 active MiG-29s (25 MiG-29As, six MiG-29UBs) as of 2017. They are stationed with the 1st Tactical Squadron at the 23rd Air Base near Mińsk Mazowiecki and the 41st TS at the 22nd Air Base near Malbork.

There have been unconfirmed reports that Poland has at one point leased a MiG-29 from its own inventory to Israel for evaluation and the aircraft has since been returned to Poland, as suggested by photographs of a MiG-29 in Israeli use. Three Polish MiG-29As were reported in Israel for evaluation between April and May 1997 in the Negev Desert. On 7 September 2011, the Polish Air Force awarded a contract to the WZL 2 company to modernise its MiG-29 fleet to be compatible with Polish F-16s.

Four MiG-29s from 1. elt participated in the Baltic Air Policing mission in 2006, while 41. elt aircraft did so in 2008, 2010 and 2012. Polish MiG-29s played the aggressor role in the NATO Tactical Leadership Programme (TLP) joint training program in Albacete in 2011, 2012 and 2013.

On 18 December 2017, a MiG-29 crash-landed in a forest near the 23rd Air Base while performing a landing approach. The pilot did not eject, but survived the crash with minor injuries. This was the first crash of a MiG-29 during its nearly three decades long operational history in the Polish Air Force. On 6 July 2018, another MiG-29 crashed near Pasłęk, with its pilot dying in an ejection attempt. Technical issues are suspected to have played a role in the crash. Another crash followed on 4 March 2019. This time the pilot ejected and survived.

On 8 March 2022, Poland announced a willingness to transfer their operational fleet of MiG-29 aircraft to the US via the Ramstein Air Base, in exchange for aircraft of a similar role and operational capability, with the intent of transferring the MiG-29s to Ukraine to use in the 2022 Russian invasion of Ukraine.

On 16 March 2023, Polish President Andrzej Duda announced that Poland would transfer four operational MiG-29s to Ukraine, with the understanding that additional aircraft would be delivered after servicing and preparation. Poland is the first NATO country to provide Ukraine with fighter aircraft.

On 13 April, German Defence Minister Boris Pistorius announced that Germany had approved the transfer of five MiG-29s to Ukraine. German approval was necessary because these aircraft belonged to the German Democratic Republic, which were then transferred to Poland in 2004.

==== Iraq ====
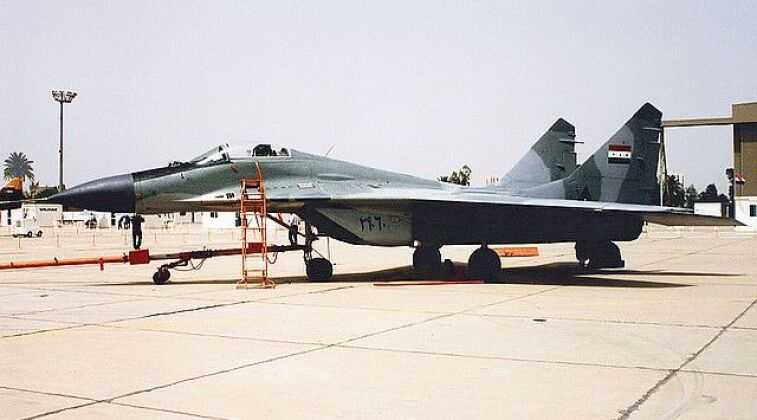
Iraqi Air Force MiG-29 fighter

Iraq received a number of MiG-29 fighters and used them to engage Iranian equivalent opponents during the later stages of the Iran–Iraq War.

===== Invasion of Kuwait and Gulf War =====
By August 1990, at the time of the Invasion of Kuwait, the Iraqi Air Force had received 37 MiG-29 (9.12B) Fulcrum-As. Iraq was reportedly unsatisfied that they did not receive the R-73 and R-27T missiles that Coalition intelligence had assessed as a great threat, instead receiving R-60MK missiles. As a result, they did not order any more aircraft. Iraq was reportedly able to modify their MiG-29s to carry both drop tanks and the TMV-002 Remora ECM pod.

MiG-29s saw combat in the 1991 Persian Gulf War with the Iraqi Air Force. Five MiG-29s were shot down by USAF F-15s. As per some sources, the Iraqi Air Force claimed a British Panavia Tornado, ZA467, was shot down in northwestern Iraq by a MiG-29. British sources claim this Tornado to have crashed on 22 January on a mission to Ar Rutbah. Another Tornado is also claimed by an Iraqi MiG-29, this time, and IDS variant belonging to the AMI from either the 4th or 5th Fighter Squadron, again using an R-60 missile.

Other Iraqi air-to-air kills are reported in Russian sources, where the US claims other cases of combat damage, such as a B-52 which the US claims was hit by friendly fire, when an AGM-88 high-speed, anti-radiation missile (HARM) homed on the fire-control radar of the B-52's tail gun; the bomber returned to base and was subsequently renamed "In HARM's Way". It is believed that an F-111 Aardvark was hit by a missile fired by a MiG-29 but it was able to return to base. A MiG-29 from the 4th or 5th TFS also had a less fortunate kill against a friendly aircraft, a MiG-23ML using a R-27R missile on the 17th of January, 1991. This case of fratricide was not the first of this type, but a MiG-29 of the 5th TFS shot down another MiG-29 of the same unit using an R-60MK in April 1988, though the circumstances are not entirely known.

===== Post Gulf War =====
Iraq's original fleet of 37 MiG-29s was reduced to 12 after the Gulf War. One MiG-29 was damaged, and between four and nine were reportedly flown to Iran. The remaining 12 aircraft were withdrawn from use in 1995 because the engines needed to be overhauled but Iraq could not send them off for that work. After the American-led 2003 invasion of Iraq and disbandment of the Ba'athist Iraqi Army in May of the same year, the remaining Soviet-made and Chinese-made fighters of the Iraqi Air Force had been decommissioned.

==== Iran ====
After the Iran-Iraq war, Iran placed an order for MiG-29s from the Soviet Union. The first batch of the aircraft was delivered in 1990 and became operational with the Iran Air Force on 7 October 1990. While the exact number of purchases is unknown, at least 24 MiG-29s (20As and 4UBs) were sold to Iran. During the Persian Gulf War, at least four and up to nine Iraqi MiG-29s were flown over to Iran for safekeeping from allied forces, which Iran confiscated later as reparations for the damage caused during the earlier Iran-Iraq war. Some sources say seven (with three crashes along the way) were sent over. Later, when Moldova attempted to sell its MiG-29s in 1992, Iran was touted as one of the possible buyers. Iran set up an overhaul and refurbishment program for their MiG-29s at Mehrabad by Iranian Aircraft Industry with Indian assistance after they experienced difficulties with their fleet. A number of MiG-29s received bolt on refueling probes, created new drop tanks and wired the MiGs for western origin air to air missiles with modified MiG-29s receiving a new camouflage (light grey and light blue).

Iran has used MiG-29s continuously since their induction, but has lost some in incidents. During their delivery flight, one MiG-29A crashed when its Soviet pilot got lost flying the aircraft to Iran and was forced to eject. Another MiG-29A was lost shortly after when a MiG-29A flown by an Iranian pilot crashed while flying low with the Iranians claiming mechanical failure but a MiG inquiry concluded that the pilot experienced disorientation and flew into a mountain. A single attiration replacement was delivered at some point in the 1990s. More recent incidents include one in 2016 and another in December 2019 due to a crash in the Sabalan Mountains.

As of March 2025, Iran was estimated to have an inventory of 18 MiG-29s. In September 2025, as per a statement by a member of the Iranian Supreme National Security Council to the Islamic Consultative Assembly, Iran reportedly received unknown number of MiG-29s from Russia. The Iranian MiG-29s are equipped with Soviet N019 Rubin radar, and are capable of carrying R-27R and R-73RMD air to air missiles.

===== 2026 Iran War =====
During the 2026 Iran war, the MiG-29s were used to intercept Israeli and US missiles, attack and surveillance drones over Iranian cities and military sites.

==== Syria ====
Syria was the second export customer of the MiG-29, receiving them before most of the Warsaw Pact nations did, with the Syrian Defence Minister Mustafa Tlass initially seeking to acquire up to 150 MiG-29s in order to modernize the SyAAF. The very first Fulcrums arrived in Syria in June or July 1987 as a batch of 16 and more were delivered in the late 1980s. A total of up to 48 MiG-29As and UBs were delivered in the original batches, with 16 more delivered in the mid to late 1990s (these reportedly airframes built for Iraq in 1990-91 but undelivered due to sanctions and the Gulf War). Over time, these airframes were upgraded to an unknown standard.

===== Syrian - Israeli skirmishes =====
Syrian Arab Air Force MiG-29s have sometimes encountered Israeli fighter and reconnaissance aircraft. Western sources state that two Israeli F-15Cs shot down two MiG-29As on 2 June 1989 under unclear circumstances thought this is not confirmed by Syrian sources. Some reports claim that between 1990 and 1991, several air battles occurred between the Syrians and the Israelis and one MiG-29 is alleged to have been lost in those engagements, with Israeli losses in these clashes claimed but unverified.

Further reports claim that on 14 September 2001 two Syrian Air Force MiG-29s were shot down by two Israeli F-15Cs while the MiGs were intercepting an Israeli reconnaissance aircraft off the coast of Lebanon. However, both Syria and Israel deny that this occurred, yet unofficial sources continue to hold that an engagement did take place, with the names of the Syrian pilots given being Maj. Arshad Midhat Mubarak, and Capt. Ahmad al-Khatab and both were reported rescued from the Mediterranean. It is stated that the battle occurred when an Israeli Air Force Boeing 707 SIGINT aircraft, escorted by two F-15Cs armed with advanced Python Mk.IV missiles, was conducting a routine surveillance mission along the Lebanese and Syrian coasts, monitoring telecommunications and radar activity near Tripoli and Hamidiyah. Such missions, conducted twice weekly, were typically shadowed by Syrian interceptors—usually MiG-23s or MiG-29s—that maintained a safe distance and showed no hostile intent. However, at 09:14 that day, two Syrian MiG-29s suddenly turned aggressively toward the Israeli formation, prompting the F-15s to order the 707 to retreat and activate ECM, while reinforcements were scrambled. After warnings on the international distress frequency were ignored, one F-15 shot down the lead MiG-29 with a Python Mk.IV missile, while the second MiG, attempting to retreat, was destroyed by a close-range AIM-9M Sidewinder, both crashing into the Mediterranean and the pilots were retrieved.

===== Syrian Civil War =====
Syrian MiG-29s entered the Syrian Civil War in late October 2013, attacking Free Syrian Army insurgents with unguided rockets and bombs in Damascus and during the war, MiG-29SM fighters (a deep upgrade by Russia of the platform) were delivered to the SyAAF. A Syrian MiG-29SM crashed on 5 March 2020 near Shayrat Airbase. Marking the first crash of the plane in the Syrian Air Force since 2001. According to avia.pro the aircraft may have been shot down by MANPADS operated by the Syrian Opposition. After the fall of the Assad Ba'athist Regime, the remaining assets of the SyAAF were largely taken over the opposition forces, which formed the new government. The Israelis - who were concerned about the instability with the new regime - destroyed at least 30 MiG-29s as part of Operation Bashan Arrow which involved Israeli Strikes on Syrian Defence Infrastructure including air bases, and the condition of any surviving aircraft is uncertain.

==== Malaysia ====
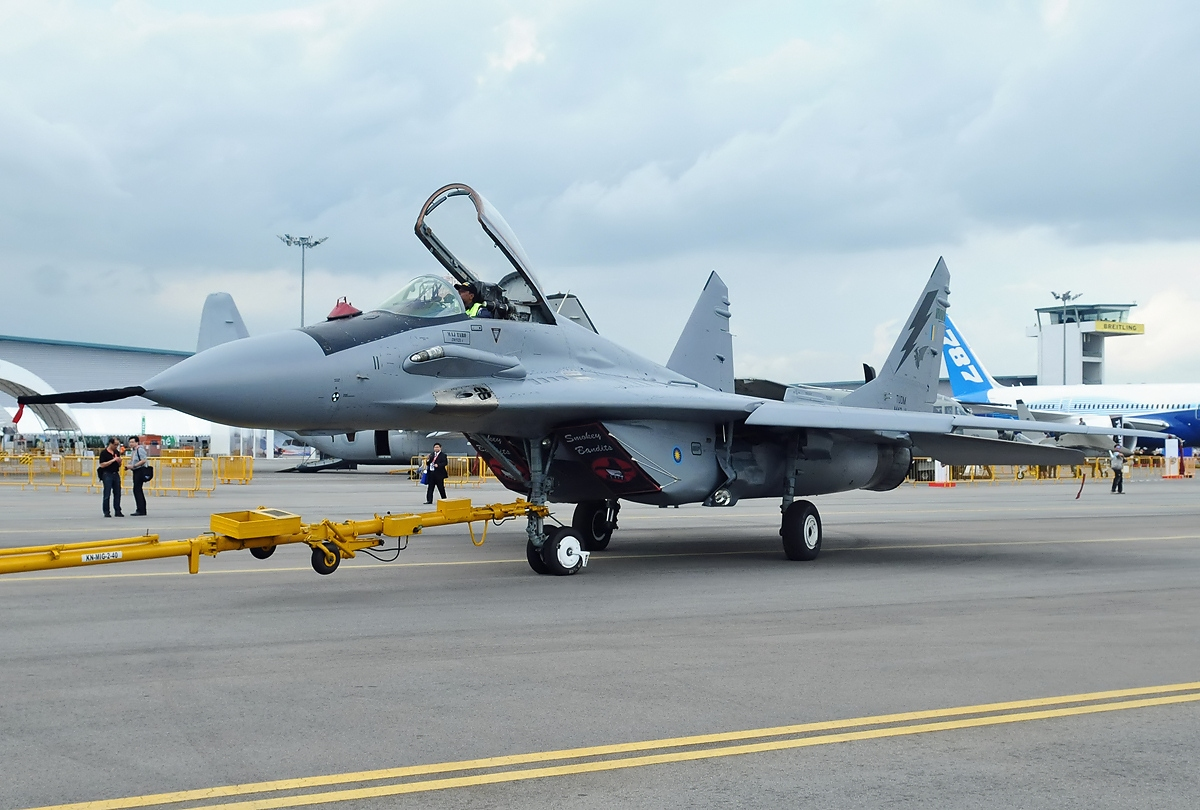
A Malaysian MiG-29 in 2012

Russia and Malaysia signed an agreement for the purchase of 16 single and two dual MiG-29s on 7 June 1994 for a total value of $560 Million with the aircraft delivered to include a number of modifications including improved engines, a stronger airframe, higher gross weight, increased ordnance load, and more capable avionics (including an upgraded radar). The single seaters were set to be retrofitted with a refueling probe post-delivery. These fighters were not new built fighters however, but were rather white tails (aircraft that were already built but without a paying customer) as neither the Soviet or Russian governments had paid for these fighters originally manufactured in 1989–1990. They were stored at Tretyakovo aerodrome, overhauled and modified they were delivered on schedule. They are serialed M43-01 and 02 (for the dual seat trainers) and -03 to -18 for the single seaters, and are referred to as MiG-29Ns (Fulcrum-As).

The fighters were used to equip the No.17 Squadron "Typhoons" and No. 19 Squadron "Cobras", with the first two delivered airframes (single seaters M43-03 and M-43-04) delivered by an AN-124 Langkawi Airbase near Kuala Lumpur. The Royal Malaysian Air Force operated 18 MiG-29N/NUB aircraft from 1995 to 2017 out of its air base in Kuantan, all belonging to the 1st Air Division HQ based out of Kuala Lumpur

Malaysian MiG-29s would participate in Exercise Jagukh in the Spring of 1996, and with the SEATO members in their largest exercise up to that time, Exercise Flying Fish '97 on 12–30 April 1997 involving over 12,000 personnel in the South China Sea, where the MiGs were especially praised, and they participated alongside Malaysia's F-5Es. They also received technical assistance from MAPO MiG personnel on the ground at this time with 14 of the 16 single seat aircraft ready at this time. One MIG-29, M43-05 was displayed at an airshow in Jakarta, Indonesia between 22 and 30 June 1996.

It was planned that the aircraft would be upgraded with glass cockpits around 2003, when they also adopted camouflage patterns that the Su-30MKMs (which were being newly inducted) were given. In 2009, it was announced that the jets would be gradually phased out by the end of 2010 as a result of increasing maintenance costs, which would save approximately $76 million annually. The Malaysian defence ministry subsequently went back on its position and announced it would keep ten planes in service and only retire the remaining six. In 2013, it was announced that the MiG-29 fleet would be retired by 2015. However, delays with its Multi-Role Combat Aircraft (MRCA) program meant the jets were kept in service and set to be upgraded to extend their lifespan, but these plans ultimately did not materialise and they were finally retired in 2017.

One crashed in July 1998 (M43-17) as a result of hydraulic and battery failures, and another in 2004 after its engine caught on fire after takeoff. Both pilots ejected and survived.

==== North Korea ====
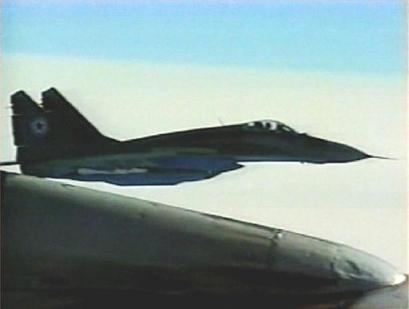
A North Korean MiG-29 intercepting a USAF RC-135S in 2003

The Korean People's Air Force is believed to operate about 18 MiG-29s which are assigned to the 55th Air Regiment based at Sunchon Air Base. In addition to 13 MiG-29 (9.12B) Fulcrum As and 2 Fulcrum B trainers that were delivered in 1987, North Korea also became the only Cold War export customer and licensed manufacturer of the Fulcrum-C. Called the MiG-29S-13 (9.13B) Fulcrum-C, they were delivered to North Korea from the USSR/Russia between 1991 and 1992 in knock down parts. Only three S-13s were completed due to Russia refusing to supply more parts to North Korea. The first locally built Fulcrum-C flew on 15 April 1993. These were first encountered and photographed by the US Air Force in March 2003 when a pair of KPAF MiG-29s intercepted a RC-135S Cobra Ball reconnaissance aircraft.

On 17 May 2025, the North Korean MiG-29 was seen testing a new active radar homing missile which resembled the American AIM-120 and Chinese PL-12. The missile seemed to outperform the given Soviet-era MiG-29's radar in terms of range. In November 2025, during an event marking the 80th anniversary of the air force, the North Korean MiG-29s were spotted sporting a new short range infrared air-to-air missile. The missiles were noted to being similar in configuration to the German IRIS-T, Japanese Type-04, and the Chinese PL-10E.

==== Sudan ====
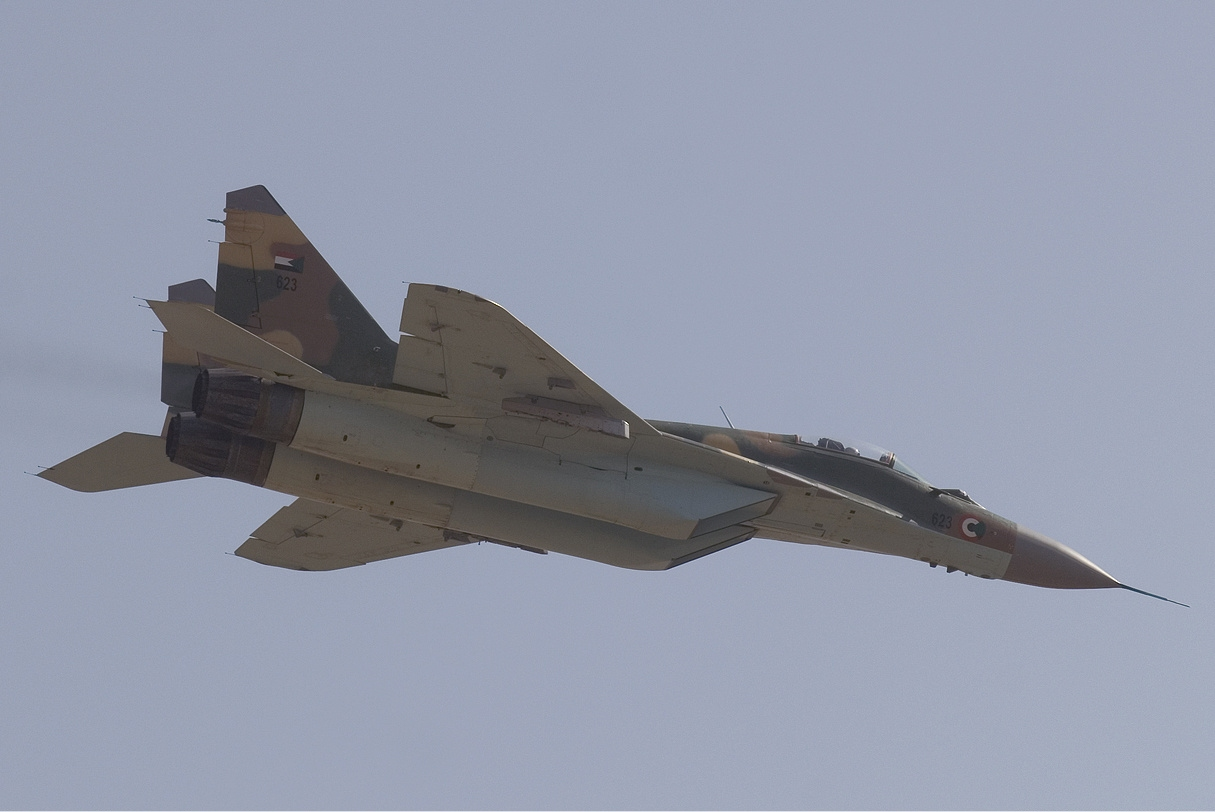
Sudanese Air Force MiG-29SE

Sudan took delivery of 12 MiG-29s from Russia (though some earlier sources indicated that these were Ukrainian machines) in July 2004, which were used to form the No.2 Squadron and comprised 10 MiG-29SEs (Project 9.13Bs) and two MiG-29UB trainers. Images of one airframe before delivery exist, serialed 623 (black). An anonymous Russian source claimed that the aircraft had been delivered before 2004. On 14 November 2008 Sudanese Ministry of Defence admitted that Sudan had received 12 MiG-29s from Russia.

===== Darfur War =====
There have been occasional claims regarding the use of Sudanese Air Force MiG-29s against insurgent forces in Darfur. However, whereas Mi-24 combat helicopters as well as Nanchang A-5 or, more recently, Su-25 ground-attack aircraft have been spotted and photographed on Darfurian airfields, no MiG-29s have been observed. On 10 May 2008, a Darfur rebel group, the Justice and Equality Movement (JEM) mounted an assault on the Sudanese capital. During this action, the JEM shot down a Sudanese Air Force MiG-29 with 12.7 and 14.5 mm (0.500 and 0.571 in) heavy machine gun fire while it was attacking a convoy of vehicles in the Khartoum suburb of Omdurman. The aircraft was piloted by a Russian mercenary. He was killed in action as his parachute did not open after ejecting.

===== 2012 South Sudan conflict =====
During the brief 2012 South Sudan–Sudan border conflict, on 4 April 2012, Sudan People's Liberation Army (SPLA) claimed the downing of a Sudanese MiG-29 using antiaircraft guns. The Sudan government denied the claim. On 16 April 2012, the SPLA issued a second claim about the downing of a Sudanese MiG-29. It is not clear if this second claim referred to the previous one.

===== Sudanese Civil War =====
On 15 April 2023, a Sudanese MiG-29 was captured on film firing missiles over Khartoum during a skirmish with paramilitary forces. On 25 May 2023, a Sudanese MiG-29 was filmed being shot down by the Rapid Support Forces (RSF) over Omdurman. The pilot ejected and survived, although he was wounded and captured. A MiG-29 of the Sudanese Air Force shot down a transport aircraft contracted by the United Arab Emirates (who were supporting the RSF) that was carrying north of 40 Colombian mercenaries near Nyala Airport on 7 August 2025, this being the second such transport lost (Friendly fire by the RSF is believed to have been the cause of another loss the year before).

==== Eritrea ====
The Eritrean Airforce acquired MiG-29s shortly after their independence from Ethiopia as part of an arms modernization programs from Russia (one source states Ukraine), originally acquiring ten to twelve and acquired six more from Moldova in 2003. Different sources disagree on whether Eritrea bought MiG-29s to counter Ethiopian Su-27s or if Ethiopia bought Su-27s to counter their MiG-29s, but both were at around the same time.

===== Ethiopian - Eritrean (Badme) War =====
Eritrean Fulcrums were deployed as part of the 5th Squadron based out of Asmara during the Ethiopian-Eritrean War, and were sometimes flown by mercenary pilots from the former USSR. During the 1998-2000 Eritrean-Ethiopian War, a number of Eritrean MiG-29s engaged Ethiopian Su-27s piloted by Russian mercenaries and local pilots trained by Russian instructors and Eritrean MiG-29s were used to intercept Ethiopian air support and strike packages.

During the February 1999 Eritrean - Ethiopian Aerial Clashes, Eritrean MiG-29s engaged Ethiopian Su-27s for the first time on February 21, resulting in damage to one MiG-29 and further engagements occurred later in the same month on 25 and 26 February. Each of these engagements resulted in the loss of one Eritrean MiG-29 in each encounter, both pilots were lost. Ethiopia claims between five and seven MiG-29s throughout 1999–2000 by their Su-27s, but only the two lost in February 1999 can be confirmed. Up to 29 R-27 missiles were fired in these engagements, and represented the first such long range combat between fourth Generation fighters.

There are also some other reports of Eritrean MiG-29s shooting down Ethiopian aircraft, the claimed kills for Eritrean MiG-29s are four MiG-21MFs, and one to three MiG-23s (including one MiG-23BN on the 25th of February 1999 with two R-27Rs, possibly the first kill with that missile type) and at least one Su-25. The claim that an Eritrean MiG-29 shot down an Ethiopian Su-25 is disputed, since the Ethiopian Su-25TK in question was damaged in an accident in May 2000, is actually stored and used for spares at Bishoftu Air Base.

===== Later service and defections =====
It was reported that in 2016, an Eritrean MiG-29UB defected to Ethiopia with two pilots, though details surrounding the event are unclear. None are reported to be active as of 2024, with sanctions in place and Eritrea has since acquired Su-27s.

==== Cuba ====
The Cuban Air Force initially sought to acquire between 35 and 40 MiG-29s from the Soviet Union, enough to equip two squadrons or one aviation regiment. This was revised down to fourteen aircraft due to economic conditions - 12 MiG-29As and two MiG-29UBs. The Soviet Union was initially hesitant to provide Cuba with fulcrums due to warming relations with the United States but eventually agreed to. These supplemented other fighter types in Cuban service like the MiG-21s and MiG-23s, but deliveries were incomplete by the fall of the Soviet Union. As of 2026, none are believed to be flying.

===== Brothers to the Rescue shootdown =====
A Cuban MiG-29UB shot down two Cessna 337s belonging to the organisation Brothers to the Rescue in 1996 after it was vectored to intercept them following a MiG-23 outside of Cuban territorial waters after the aircraft approached Cuban airspace with a third Cessna escaping.

==== United States ====
In 1997, the US purchased 21 Moldovan MiG-29 aircraft under the Nunn–Lugar Cooperative Threat Reduction program. Fourteen were MiG-29S models, which are equipped with an active radar jammer in its spine and are capable of being armed with nuclear weapons. Part of the US' motive to purchase these aircraft was to prevent them from being sold to Iran. This purchase could also provide the tactical fighter communities of the USAF, the USN and the USMC with a working evaluation and data for the MiG-29, and possibly for use in dissimilar air combat training. Such information may prove valuable in any future conflicts and can aid in the design and testing of current and future weapons platforms. In late 1997, the MiGs were delivered to the National Air and Space Intelligence Center (NASIC) at Wright-Patterson Air Force Base in Ohio, though many of the former Moldovan MiG-29s are believed to have been scrapped. Some of these MiG-29s are currently on open display at Nellis AFB, Nevada; NAS Fallon, Nevada; Goodfellow AFB, Texas; and Wright-Patterson AFB, Ohio.

The private defense contractor AirUSA (later known as Ravn Aerospace), based at Quincy, Illinois, imported two MiG-29UB trainers from Kyrgyzstan into the US in 1996. Their first MiG-29 was restored and made airworthy in 2010, having its first flight on 10 December. As of 2020, the company also has acquired two single-seat MiG-29 as spare parts donors.

==== Yemen ====
After the end of the 1994 civil war, newly reunified Yemen inherited several intact MiG-29s, bought by South Yemen a few months earlier. In 1995–1996, Yemen also received two additional jets from Kazakhstan. In 2001, a major arms deal including the purchase of up to 36 upgraded MiG-29s was signed, with deliveries starting in June 2002. Equipped with N019MP radar and an advanced fire control system, they became the most advanced combat aircraft in the Yemeni Air force arsenal. They are compatible with Kh-31P and Kh-29T guided air-to-ground missiles, as well as R-77 air-to-air missiles.

==== Bangladesh ====
Bangladesh first ordered its MiG-29s in 1999 under a deal worth between $115 and $125 Million with Russia, including airframes and ground support, the support of 12 Russian personnel in Bangladesh, and initial training for 10 pilots and 70 technicians, which proved politically contentious. The aircraft were split as six MiG-29SEs (Project 9.12SE) and two UB trainers (Project 9.51). The first four were delivered in December 1999 (two on the 25th and two on the 28th) with the remaining four in February 2000, assigned to the 5th Squadron "Supersonics" at Bashar Airbase (Tejgoan Airfield) near Dhaka, officially entering service in March 2000. They are now operated by the 8th Squadron "Vigilants" at BAF base Bir Uttom Khandaker, near Dhaka. Of the six MiG-29SEs delivered to the Bangladeshis (serialed 36100, 36501–507), one (36501) was an ex-MAPO demonstrator (the 999 "Silver" demonstrator). The two UBs were given the serials 28264 and 28375.

Air Vice Marshal Jamal Uddin Ahmed stated in an interview on 5 July 1999 that these aircraft would be useful if Bangladesh ever had an external threat, though he admitted it was not the case at the moment. The purchase of the aircraft was controversial within Bangladesh, with the Leader of the Official Opposition, Begum Khaleda Jia, alleging that the aircraft may have been bought due to corruption or Indian interference, with the possibility of reliance on India and Russia for spares. The government responded stating that there were no irregularities, that Bangladesh operated MiG aircraft from its earliest days as a nation (acquiring MiG-21s in 1972) and pointing out that Bangladesh had for a long time acquired aircraft from other nations, such at J-7s and that nobody had objected when they acquired F-6s from Pakistan and China. The then Prime Minister, Sheikh Hasina, also stated the aircraft were acquired at a steep discount, and were the cheapest option (that nobody would have sold them aircraft at a lower rate). Bangladesh had earlier attempted to acquire F-16s from the Americans, as per her testimony, and had been turned down (with the Americans stating they had no use in the subcontinent). She also stated that they would gladly take the 16 F-16s they had originally asked for. In the mid-2000s, there was some talk of selling the MiGs due to their upkeep costs.

They were ordered to replace the ageing MiG-21s and F-6s then in service, though, due to their low numbers, modernized Chinese J-7s were also ordered later. As of 2022, Jane's Information Group reported the Bangladesh Air Force (BAF) operated 8 MiG-29s (Six MiG-29Bs & two MiG-29UBs) though they have a low serviceability rate. Four of the eight aircraft in service were overhauled in 2019 with their time before overhaul validity till 2030, with the remaining four to be overhauled in JSC 558 in Belarus, which were to be delivered back in October 2025. Bangladeshi Sources state that six of the 20 delivered jet engines are operational and a deal was proposed by the Airforce in 2025 to overhaul 12 more engines under a $30.6 Million dollar commitment to be paid over four years with JSC NASC. Previous attempts to overhaul the engines had been hampered by the Russo-Ukrainian War.

=== Failed bids ===
==== Afghanistan ====
During the Soviet withdrawal from Afghanistan, the Afghan Air Force requested the MiG-29 as a premier fighter after receiving 49 helicopters and 125 aircraft in 1989–1990, but the deal was turned down. Soviet MiG-29s were used to provide aircover for crucial sites and Soviet forces based out of Soviet territory following a failed attempt by DRAAF defectors.

==== Argentina ====
In 2021 Russia offered the Argentine Air Force a batch of 15 MiG-29 fighters and another of Su-30 fighters with 12 units and seek also the sale of Yak-130 training jet and Mil Mi-17 helicopters. Argentina selected ex-Danish Air Force F-16As and Bs as part of its new multi-role fighter, with the first BM Block 10 model being delivered to Argentina on the 24th of February, 2025.

==== Congo (Republic of) ====
The Republic of the Congo Air Force (Force Aérienne Congolaise) historically operated Soviet MiG-21s and sought to replace them with modern aircraft in the early-2000s. The Congo placed an order for five MiG-29SEs (Project 9.13E) and one MiG-29UB with RSK MIG in 2001 but these were never delivered, the order presumably being cancelled. Two Ex-South African Air Force Mirage F.1s were eventually acquired in 2011 after being refurbished by Paramount Group.

==== Ecuador ====
Ecuador placed an order for the aircraft, specifically 10 MiG-29S and two MiG-29UB fighters, in 1997 and was possibly looking at the upgraded SMT or M models. Peru, which had gone to war with Ecuador two years prior and lost three aircraft in air-air combat, acquired MiG-29s from Belarus at the same time.

==== Lebanon ====
In December 2008, Russia moved to expand its military influence in the Middle East when it announced it was giving Lebanon 10 fighter jets, that would have been the most significant upgrade of the Lebanese Armed Forces since the civil war ended almost two decades before. A Russian defence ministry representative said it was giving secondhand MiG-29s to Lebanon for free. This was to be part of a defence cooperation deal that would have included Lebanese military personnel training in Russia. On 29 February 2010, Russia agreed to change the offer to 10 Mi-24 attack helicopters based on a Lebanese request.

==== Finland ====
Before the dissolution of the Soviet Union, Finland had a policy of splitting procurement of armaments between western, eastern and domestic suppliers. The MiG-29 was planned to replace the Finnish Air Force's MiG-21 fighters up to 1988, with test flights having been done. In 1992, Finland ordered 64 F-18C/Ds (57 C models, seven D models), with the F/A-18Cs being locally assembled.

==== Nigeria ====
Nigeria started negotiating the purchase of MiG-29s from Russia for the Nigerian Air Force in 1999 but only signed a contract in 2001 for the purchase of five MiG-29As (9.12B Standard) and a single UB. These were undelivered for unknown reasons.

==== Zimbabwe ====
In 1989, Zimbabwe ordered a squadron's worth of MiG-29s to the USSR. Some Air Force of Zimbabwe personnel travelled to Russia for conversion courses, but in 1992 the deal was cancelled, as the geopolitical situation of the region was stabilising.

== Variants ==
=== Original Soviet variants ===
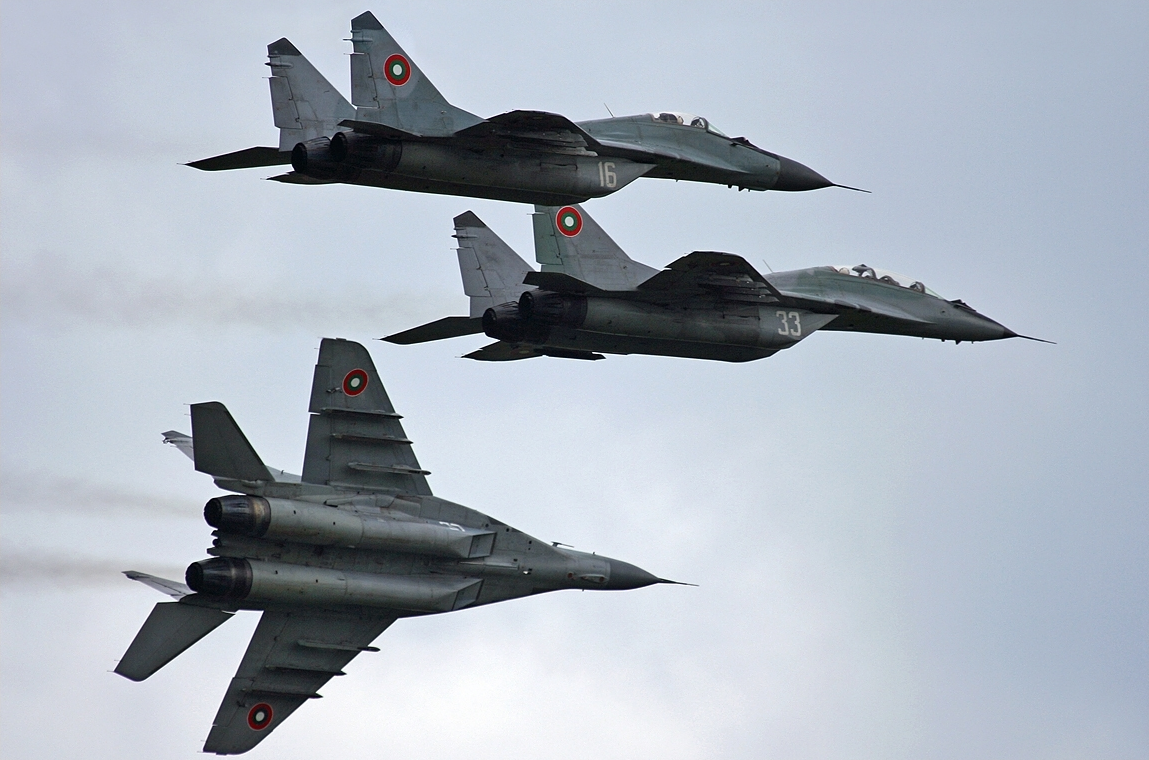
A squadron of Bulgarian Air Force MiG-29 "Fulcrum-A"

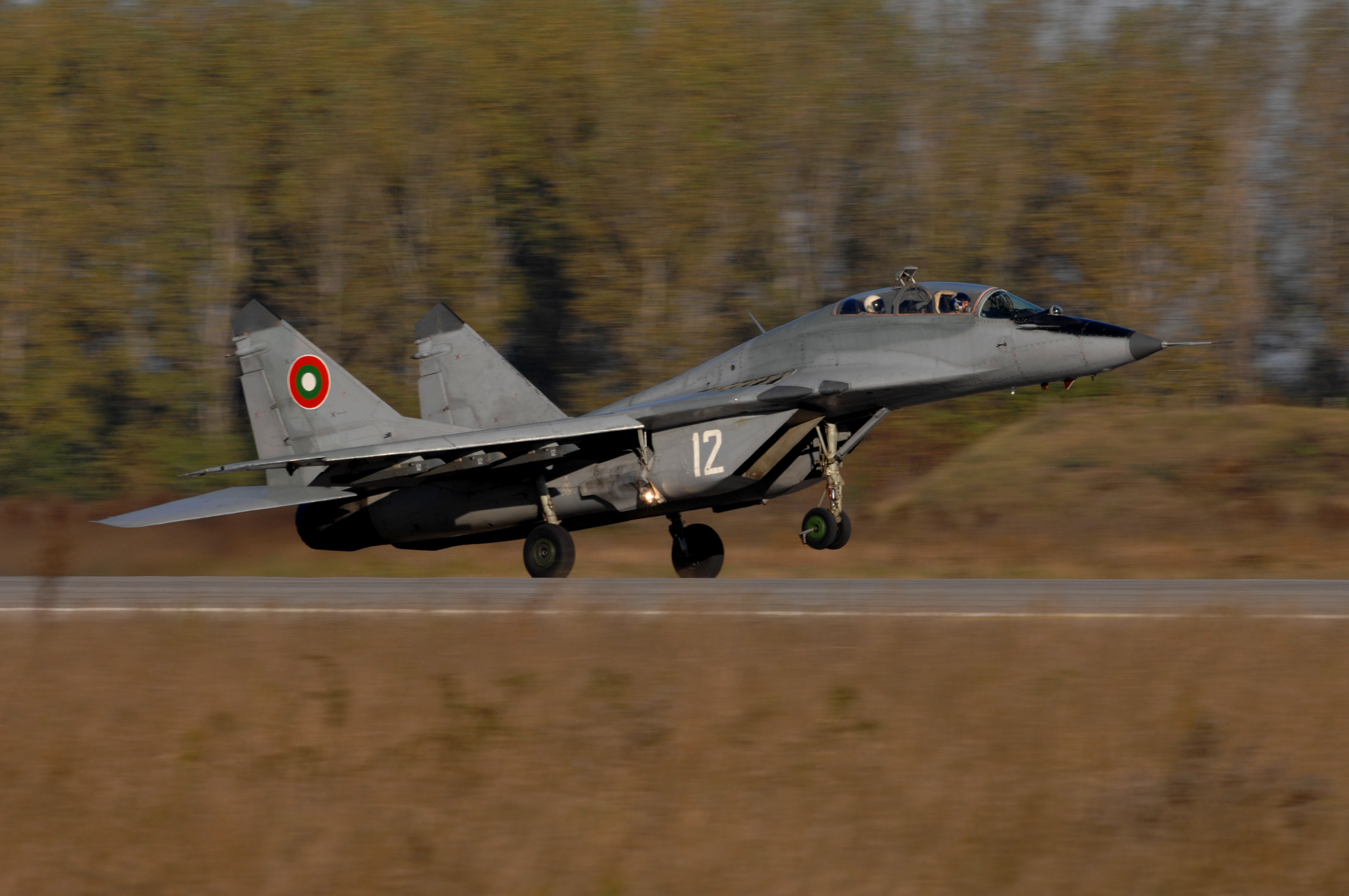
Bulgarian Air Force MiG-29UB

MiG-29 (Product 9.12) 'Fulcrum-A'
Initial production version for Soviet Air Force; entered service in 1983. NATO reporting name is "Fulcrum-A". Variant possessed the Phazotron N019 Rubin radar, OEPS-29 optical-electronic sighting system and helmet mounted sight.

MiG-29 (Product 9.12A) 'Fulcrum-A'
Export variant of the 9.12 for Warsaw Pact countries which included a downgraded RPLK-29E radar, downgraded OEPrNK-29E optoelectronic and navigation systems and older IFF transponders. This variant also lacked the capability to deliver nuclear weapons. Delivered to East Germany, Czechoslovakia, Poland, Sudan, and Romania.

MiG-29 (Product 9.12B) 'Fulcrum-A'
MiG-29 variant of the 9.12 for non Warsaw Pact countries which included a further downgraded radar and avionics. Delivered to India, Iraq, Syria, North Korea, Cuba, Malaysia, Myanmar and Eritrea.

MiG-29UB (Product 9.51) 'Fulcrum-B'
Twin seat training model. Infrared sensor mounted only, no radar. NATO reporting name is "Fulcrum-B".

MiG-29 (Product 9.13) 'Fulcrum-C'
Update of the initial production version; entered service in 1986. NATO reporting name is "Fulcrum-C". Variant possessed an enlarged dorsal spine to accommodate a larger No.1 fuel tank and the installation of the L-203BE Gardenyia-1 jammer that was lacking on the initial 9.12 version. This enlarged spine earned the 9.13 version and its successors the nickname of "Fatback".

MiG-29 (Product 9.13B) 'Fulcrum-C'
Export variant of the 9.13 provided to North Korea in semi-knocked down (SKD) kits and built in Panghyon between 1991 and 1992. Like the 9.13, it has the Gardenyia-1 jammer but has downgraded avionics and no IFF. Other sources say the Gardenyia was not delivered to North Korea.

MiG-29S (Product 9.13S) 'Fulcrum-C'
The MiG-29S was an update of the original 9.13 model retaining the NATO reporting code "Fulcrum-C" and featured flight control system improvements; a total of four new computers provided better stability augmentation and controllability with an increase of 2° in angle of attack (AoA). An improved mechanical-hydraulic flight control system allowed for greater control surface deflections. The MiG-29S can carry 1,150 L (250 imp gal; 300 U.S. gal) under wing drop tanks and a centerline tank. The inboard underwing hardpoints allow a tandem pylon arrangement for carrying a larger payload of 4,000 kg (8,800 lb). Overall maximum gross weight was raised to 20,000 kg (44,000 lb). This version also included new avionics and the new Phazotron N019M radar and Built-In Test Equipment (BITE) to reduce dependence on ground support equipment. Development of this version was initiated due to multiple systems being compromised to the West by Phazotron engineer Adolf Tolkachev. This was the final version of the MiG-29 produced before the collapse of the Soviet Union and only limited numbers were produced.

=== Upgraded variants based on original airframe ===
MiG-29S (Product 9.12S)
Post Soviet upgrade for older 9.12 variants incorporating the changes developed for version 9.13S.
MiG-29SD (Product 9.12SD)
Export variant of upgraded 9.12S with downgraded versions of radar and avionics.

MiG-29SE (Product 9.13SE)
Export variant of the 9.13S with slightly downgraded N-019ME radar with multiple target tracking ability and RVV-AE (R-77 missile) compatibility. The first export model MiG-29 with underwing drop tanks; the inner underwing pylons can carry over 500 kg (1,100 lb) bombs in side by side tandem pairs. Its weapons mix includes R-27T1, R-27ER1 and R-27ET1 medium-range missiles. The aircraft can be fitted with active ECM systems, weapons guidance aids, improved built-in check and training systems. The MiG-29SE can simultaneously engage two air targets.

MiG-29SM (Product 9.13M) 'Fulcrum-C'
Similar to the 9.13, but with the ability to carry guided air-to-surface missiles and TV- and laser-guided bombs. NATO reporting code is "Fulcrum-C".

MiG-29SM (SyAF)
For the Syrian Air Force, and based on the MiG-29SM, except the Syrian MiG-29SM uses the 9.12 airframe. RAC MiG developed a special variant for Syria.

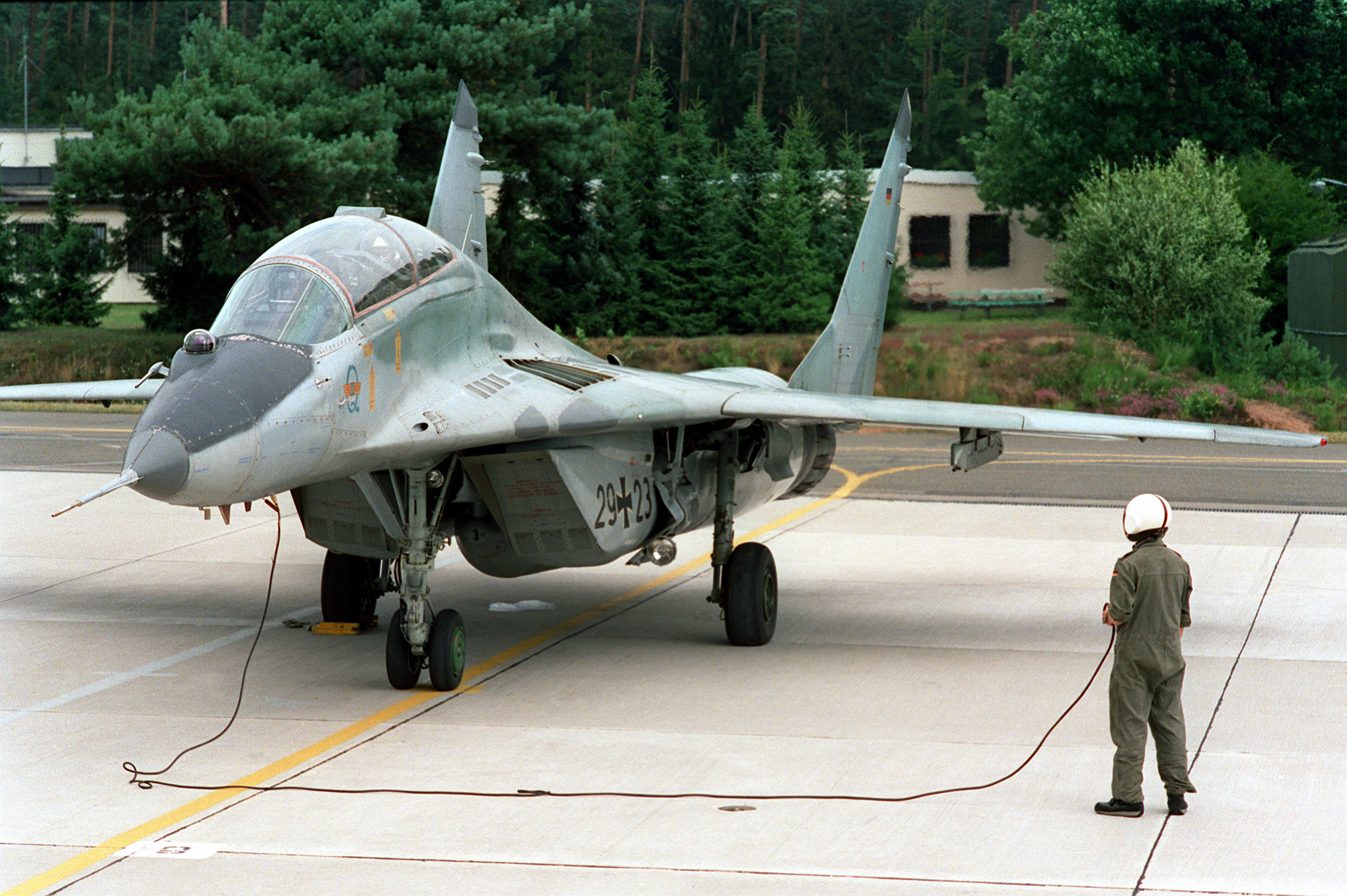
German Air Force MiG-29GT

MiG-29G/MiG-29GT
East German MiG-29A / 29UB upgraded to NATO standards, with work done by MiG Aircraft Product Support GmbH (MAPS), a joint venture company form between MiG Moscow Aviation Production Association and DaimlerChrysler Aerospace in 1993.

MiG-29AS/MiG-29UBS
Slovak Air Force performed an upgrade on their MiG-29A/-29UB for NATO compatibility. Work is done by RAC MiG and Western firms, starting from 2005. The aircraft now has navigation and communications systems from Rockwell Collins, an IFF system from BAE Systems, new glass cockpit features multi-function LC displays and digital processors and also fitted to be integrate with Western equipment in the future. However, the armaments of the aircraft remain unchanged. 12 out of 21 of the entire MiG-29 fleet were upgraded and had been delivered as of late February 2008.

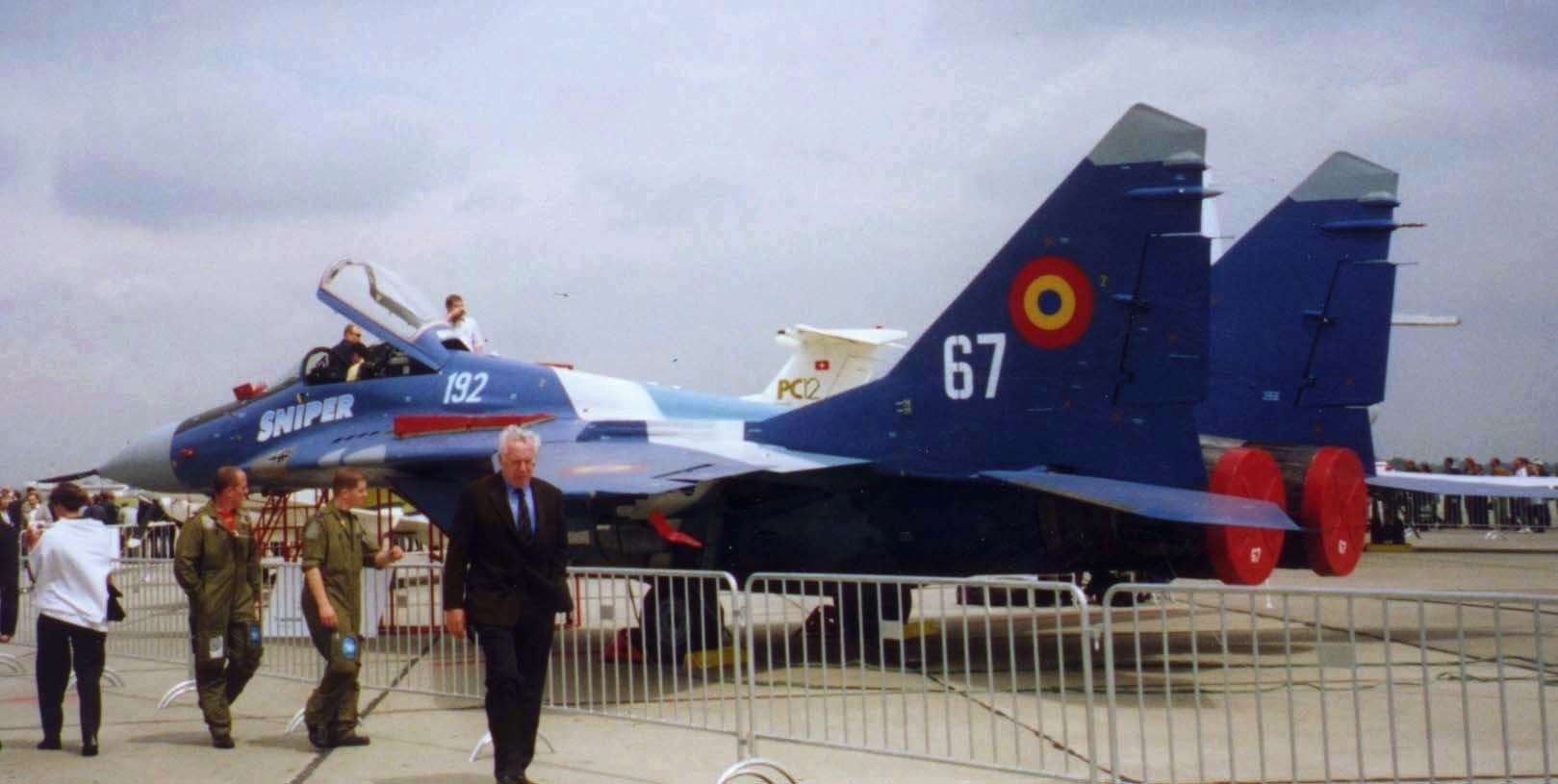
MiG-29 Sniper

MiG-29 Sniper
Upgrade planned for the Romanian Air Force by DASA, Aerostar and Elbit. DASA was responsible for program management, technical support and the test flight program (together with Elbit), Elbit was responsible for developing the avionics package, while Aerostar implemented the upgrades on the aircraft. The first flight occurred on 5 May 2000. The upgrades included the installation of a new modular multirole computer based on the MIL-STD-1553B data bus, upgraded Western avionics, new radio stations, hybrid navigation system composed of an inertial navigation system and coupled with GPS receiver, identification system, two 152 mm × 203 mm (6.0 in × 8.0 in) MFCDs, a Head-Up Display equipped with UFCP front control panel, new RWR, new HOTAS and new ADC. The addition of a new radar and the integration of Western weapons while maintaining Russian ones were also expected. The program halted due to various reasons, along with the retiring of Romanian MiG-29A/UB in 2003, the Romanian Government deciding to further invest in the MiG-21 LanceR program.

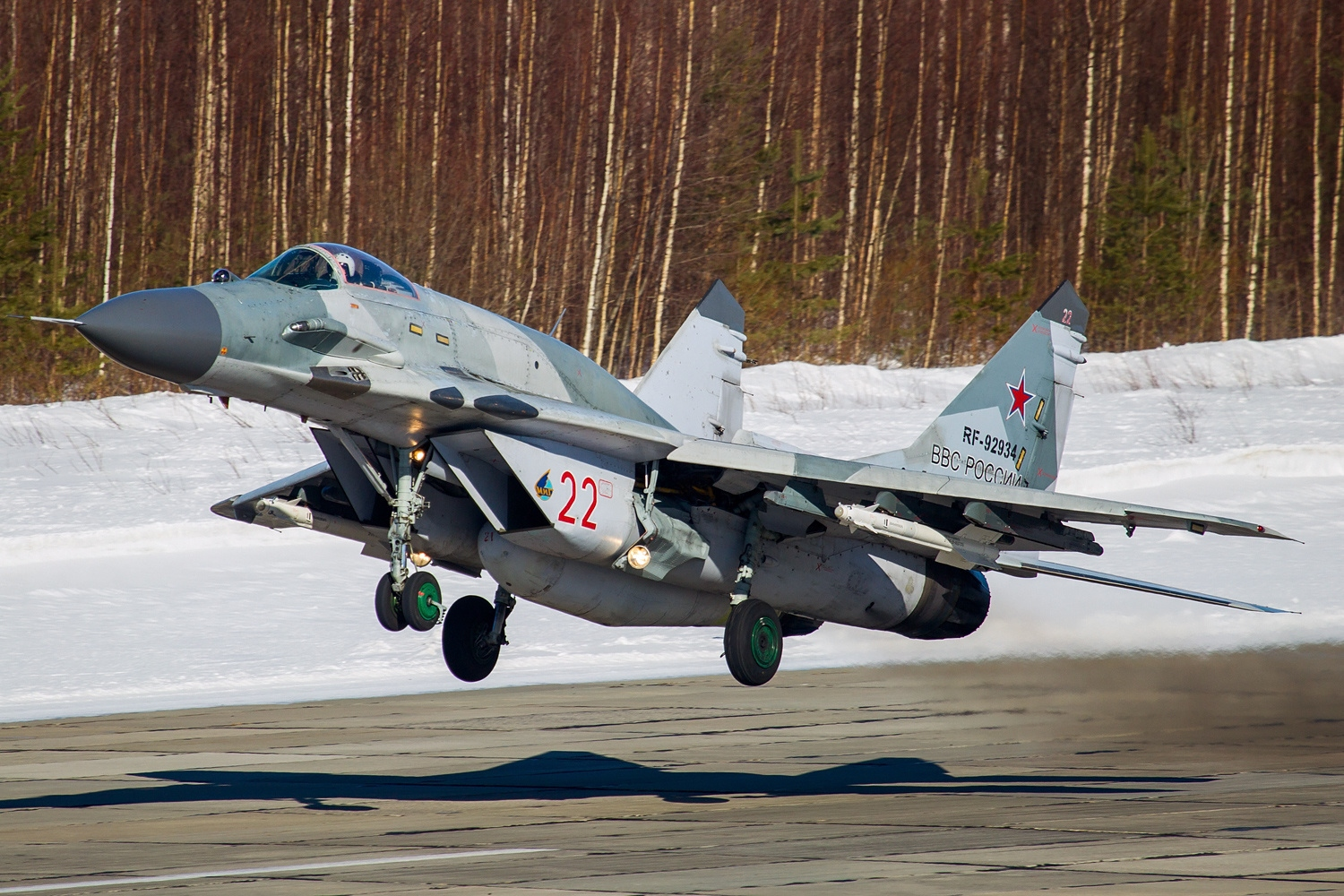
A Russian Air Force MiG-29SMT

MiG-29SMT (Product 9.17 & 9.19R)
The MiG-29SMT is an upgrade of first-generation MiG-29s (9.12 to 9.13) using enhancements on the MiG-29M. Additional fuel tanks in a further enlarged spine provide a maximum internal flight range of 2,100 km (1,300 mi). The cockpit has an enhanced HOTAS design, two 152 mm × 203 mm (6.0 in × 8.0 in) colour liquid crystal MFDs and two smaller monochrome LCDs. The MiG-29A lacked an advanced air-to-ground capability, thus the SMT upgrade adds the upgraded Zhuk-ME radar with air-to-ground radar detection and integrates air-to-ground guided weapons. It also has upgraded RD-33 ser.3 engines with afterburning thrust rated at 81 kN (18,000 lbf) each. The weapons load was increased to 4,500 kg (9,900 lb) on six underwing and one ventral hardpoints, with similar weapon choices to the MiG-29M. The late series is called MiG-29SMT(R) 9.19(R). It can also accommodate non-Russian origin avionics and weapons.

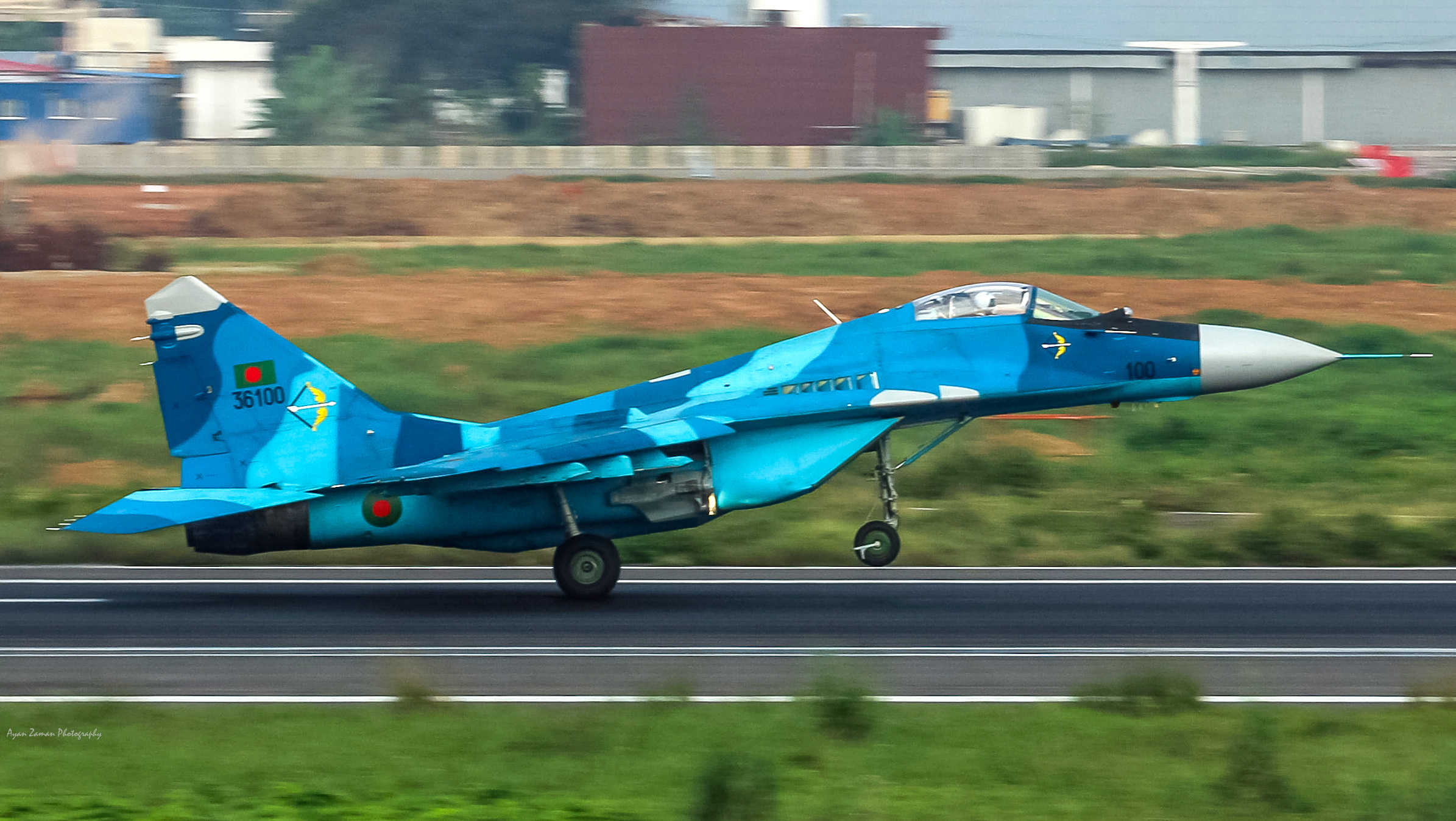
Bangladesh Air Force MiG-29BM

MiG-29BM
The MiG-29BM (probably Belarusian Modernised, possibly Bolyshaya Modernizaciya – large modernization) is an upgrade conducted by the ARZ-558 aircraft repair plant in Baranovichi, Belarus. It is a strike variant of the MiG-29 and the Belarusian counterpart to the Russian MiG-29SMT. It includes improvements to weapons, radar, as well as adding non-retractable air-air refueling ability. They entered service in 2003 and it is estimated, that ten or so were modernized to BM standard. The Bangladesh Air Force upgraded its MiG-29B similar to BM standard.

MiG-29UBT (Product 9.51T)
SMT standard upgrade for the MiG-29UB. Namely users, Russia, Algeria and Yemen.

MiG-29UPG
The UPG was a modified variant intended to upgrade the MiG-29Bs used by the Indian Air Force. The version is similar to the SMT variant with an imported avionics suite. It includes Zhuk-M radar, new avionics, an IFR probe, DRDO D-29 electronic warfare system, and enhanced RD-33 series 3 turbofan engines. It made its maiden flight on 4 February 2011.

MiG-29SMP / MiG-29UBP
The SMP/UBP are upgrades for the Peruvian Air Force MiG-29SE fleet. In August 2008 a contract of US$106 million was signed with RAC MiG for this custom SM upgrade of an initial batch of eight MiG-29, with a provision for upgrading all of Peru's MiG-29s. The single-seat version is designated SMP, whereas the twin-seat version is designated UBP. It features an improved ECM suite, avionics, sensors, pilot interface, and a MIL-STD-1553 databus. The interfaces include improved IRST capabilities for enhanced passive detection and tracking as well as better off-boresight launch capabilities, one MFCD and HOTAS. The N019M1 radar, a heavily modified and upgraded digital version of the N019 radar, replaces the standard N010 Zhuk-M of the MiG-29SMT. The upgrade also includes a structural life-extension program (SLEP), overhauled and upgraded engines, and the addition of an in-flight refuelling probe.

MiG-29N/NUB
Designation of the export of 16 MiG-29SD and 2 MiG-29UB for the Royal Malaysian Air Force.

==== MiG-29SM+ ====
The MiG-29SM+ is a significantly improved version of the Serbian airforce MiG-29SE/SM fighter jet. It combines Russian N019M1 radar, French IFF systems, and Chinese precision weapons such as the CM-400AKG, LS-6 and Russian KH-29TE.

MiG-29MU1
A Ukrainian modernization of the MiG-29A/S.

MiG-29MU2
A further Ukrainian modernization of the MiG-29S, focused on air to ground munitions.

=== Second-generation variants with modified airframe ===
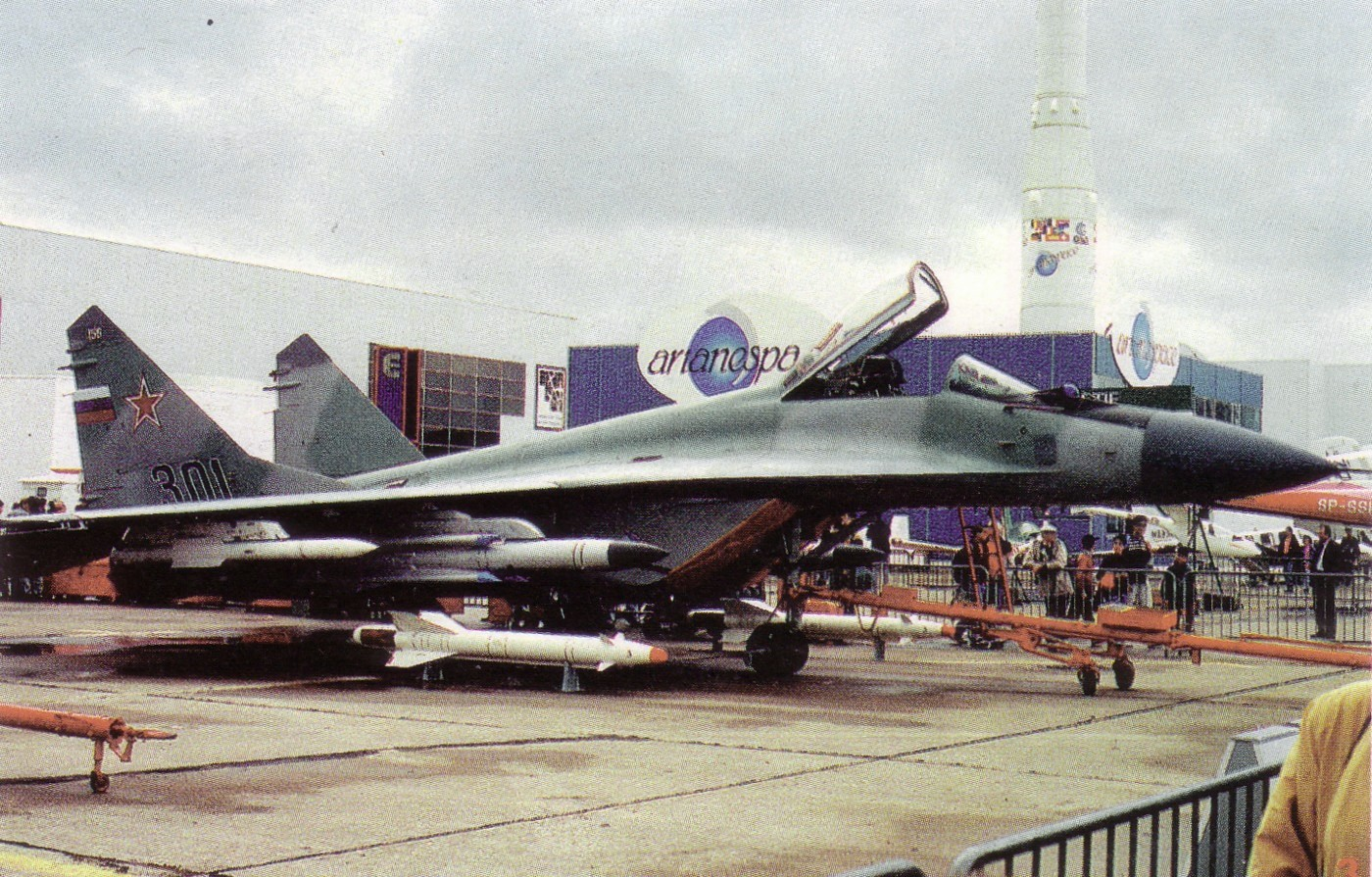
Russian MiG-29M

MiG-29M / MiG-33 (Product 9.15)
Advanced multirole variant, with a redesigned airframe, mechanical flight controls replaced by a fly-by-wire system and powered by enhanced RD-33 ser.3M engines. NATO reporting code is "Fulcrum-E".

MiG-29UBM (Product 9.61)
Two-seat training variant of the MiG-29M. Never built. Effectively continued under the designation 'MiG-29M2'.

MiG-29M2 / MiG-29MRCA
Two-seat version of MiG-29M. Identical characteristics to MiG-29M, with a slightly reduced ferry range of 1,800 km (1,100 mi). RAC MiG presented in various air shows, including Fifth China International Aviation and Aerospace Exhibition (CIAAE 2004), Aero India 2005, MAKS 2005. It was once given designation MiG-29MRCA for marketing purpose and now evolved into the current MiG-35.

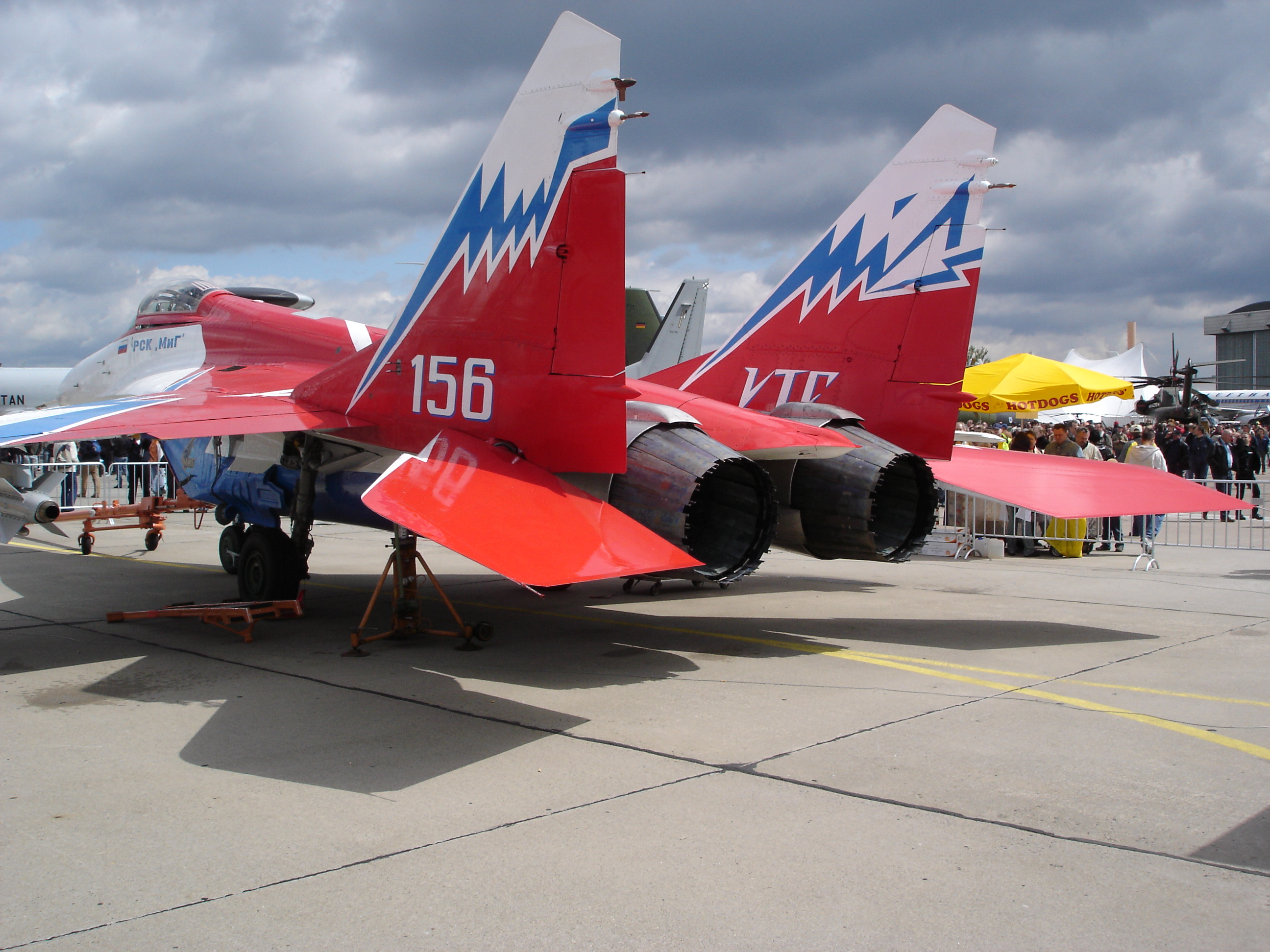
Russian MiG-29OVT on display

MiG-29OVT
The aircraft is one of the six pre-built MiG-29Ms before 1991, later received thrust vectoring engine and fly-by-wire technology. It served as a thrust-vectoring engine testbed and technology demonstrator in various air shows to show future improvement in the MiG-29M. It has identical avionics to the MiG-29M. The only difference in the cockpit layout is an additional switch to turn on vector thrust function. The two RD-133 thrust-vectoring engines, each features unique 3D rotating nozzles which can provide thrust vector deflection in all directions. However, despite its thrust-vectoring, other specifications were not officially emphasized. It is usually used as an aerobatic demonstrator and has been demonstrated along with the MiG-29M2 in various air shows around the world for potential export.

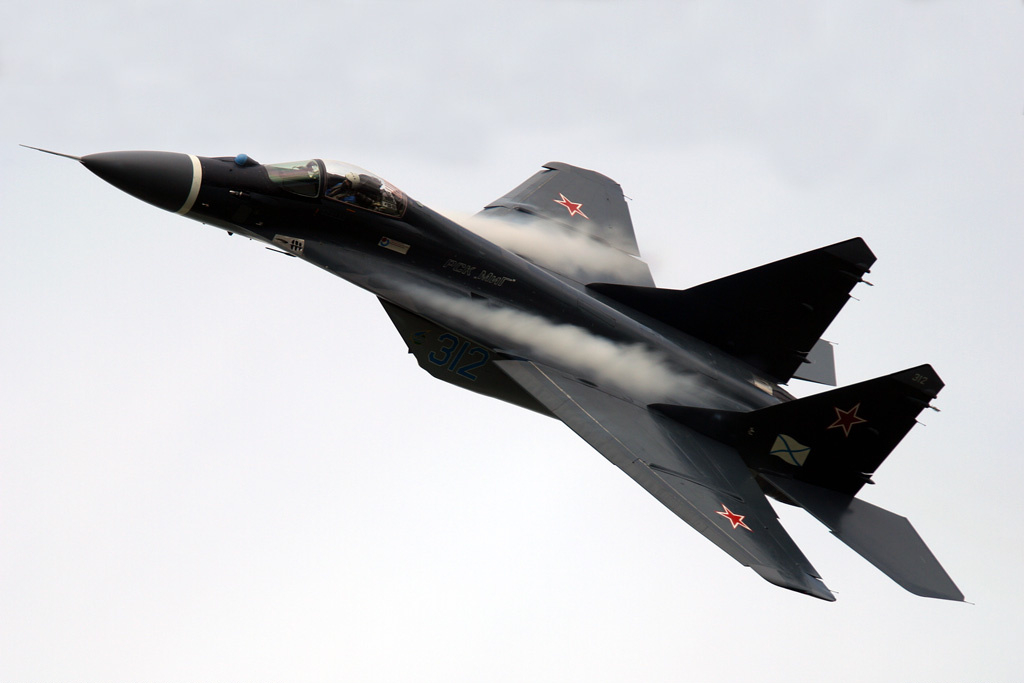
A Russian Naval Aviation MiG-29K (Izdeliye 9.31)

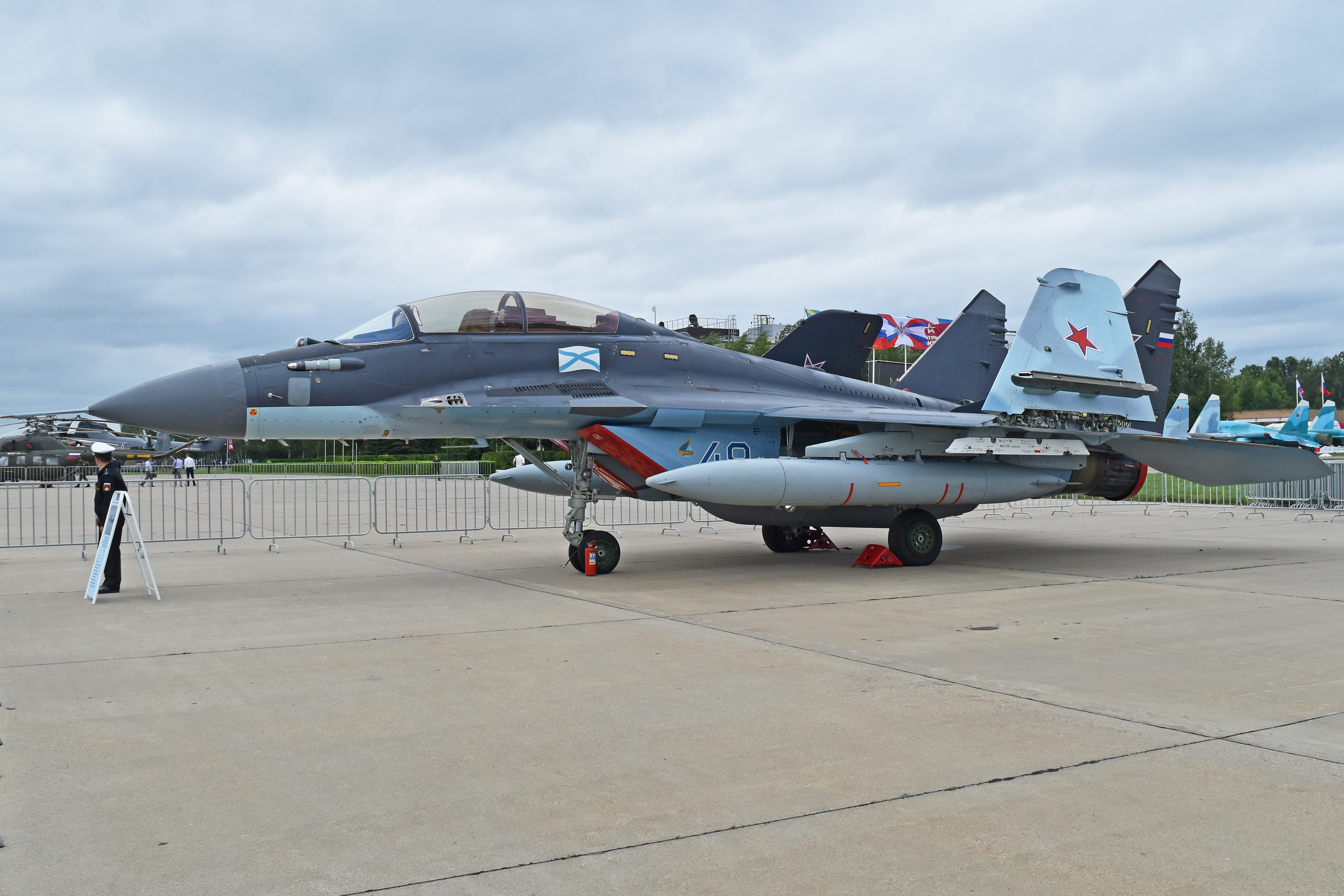
A Russian MiG-29KR being displayed with folded wings

MiG-29K (Product 9.31)

Naval variant based on MiG-29M, the letter "K" stands for "Korabelnogo bazirovaniya" (deck-based). It features folding wings, arrestor gear, and reinforced landing gear. Originally intended for the Admiral Kuznetsov class aircraft carriers, it had received series production approval from the Russian Ministry of Defence but was grounded in 1992 due to shift in military doctrine and financial difficulties. The MiG Corporation restarted the program in 1999. On 20 January 2004, the Indian Navy signed a contract of 12 single-seat MiG-29K and four two-seat MiG-29KUB. Modifications were made for the Indian Navy requirement. Production MiG-29K and MiG-29KUB share a two-seater size canopy. The MiG-29K has radar absorbing coatings to reduce radar signature. Cockpit displays consist of wide HUD and three (seven on MiG-29KUB) colour LCD MFDs with a Topsight E helmet-mounted targeting system. It has a full range of weapons compatible with the MiG-29M and MiG-29SMT. NATO reporting code is "Fulcrum-D".

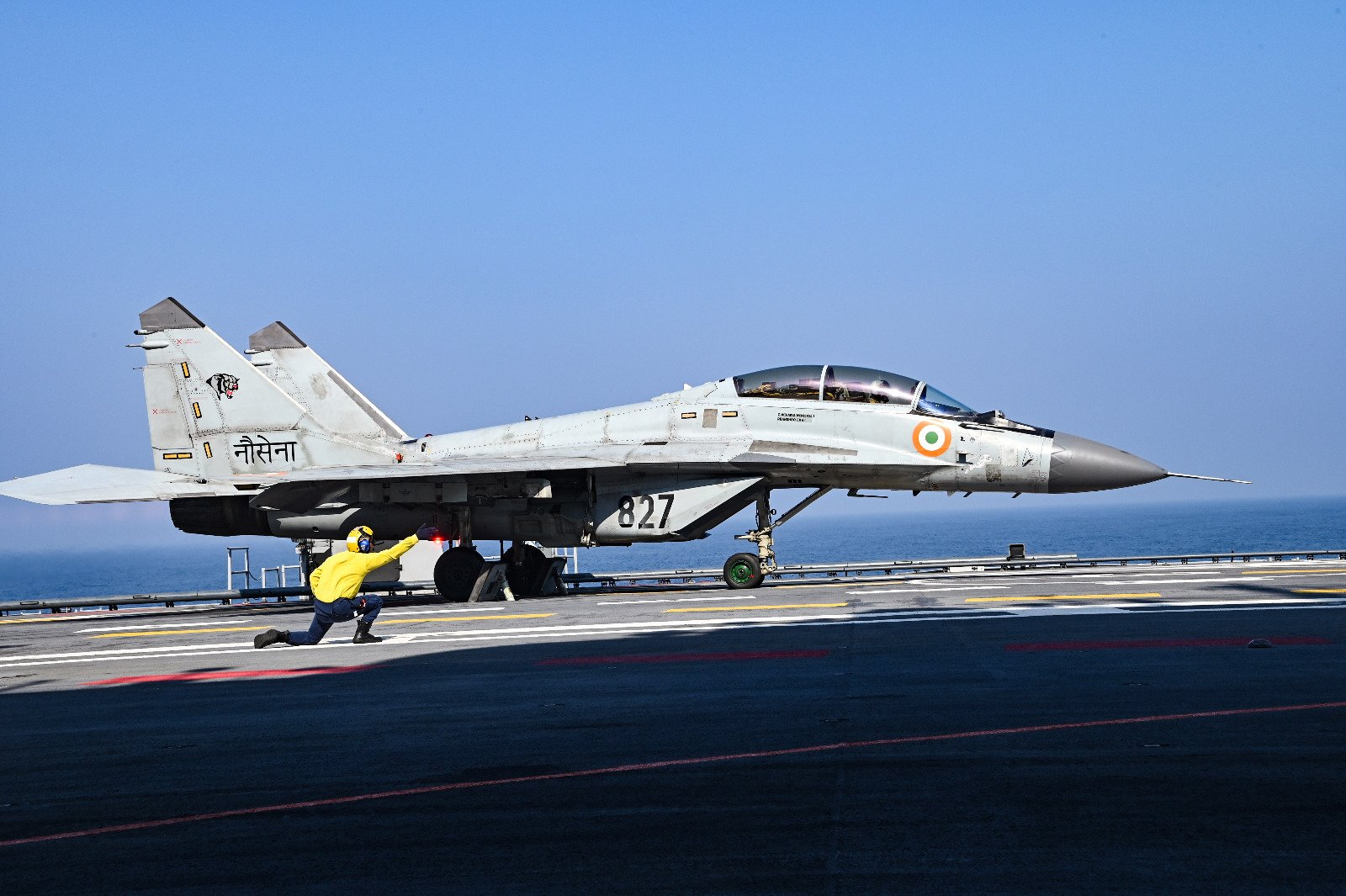
An Indian single-seat MiG-29K on INS Vikrant

MiG-29KUB (Product 9.47)
Identical characteristic to the MiG-29K but with tandem twin seat configuration. The design is to serve as trainer for MiG-29K pilot and is full combat capable. The first MiG-29KUB developed for the Indian Navy made its maiden flight at the Russian Zhukovsky aircraft test centre on 22 January 2007. NATO reporting code is "Fulcrum-D".

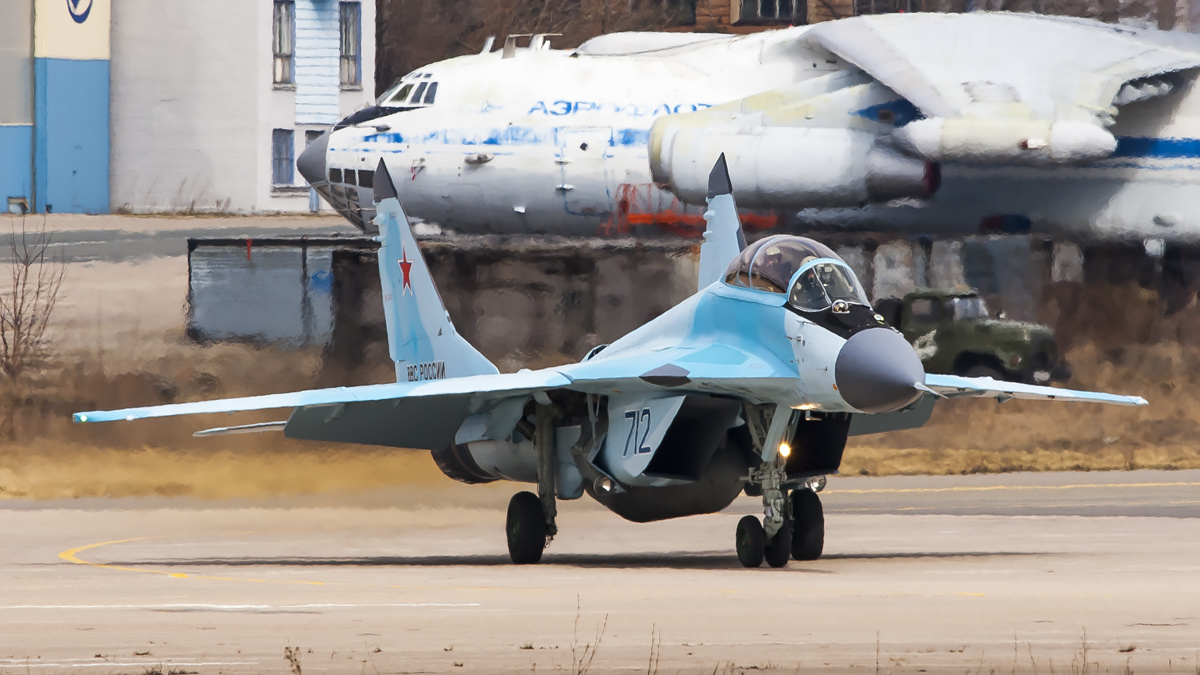
A Russian Air Force MiG-35UB

MiG-35 (Product 9.41SR)

A development of the MiG-29M/M2 and MiG-29K/KUB. NATO reporting code is "Fulcrum-F".

MiG-35D (Product 9.47SR)
Dual Seater variant of MiG-35 (see above).

MiG-35E (Product 9.61)
Export variant of MiG-35 (see above) for India, one example converted from MiG-29K, converted back.

MiG-35 (Product 9.67)
Dual Seat export variant of MiG-35 (see above) for India, one example converted from MiG-29KUB, converted back.

== Operators ==
Operators of the MiG-29 In active service In active reserve, Trainer aircraft only Former operator Privately owned

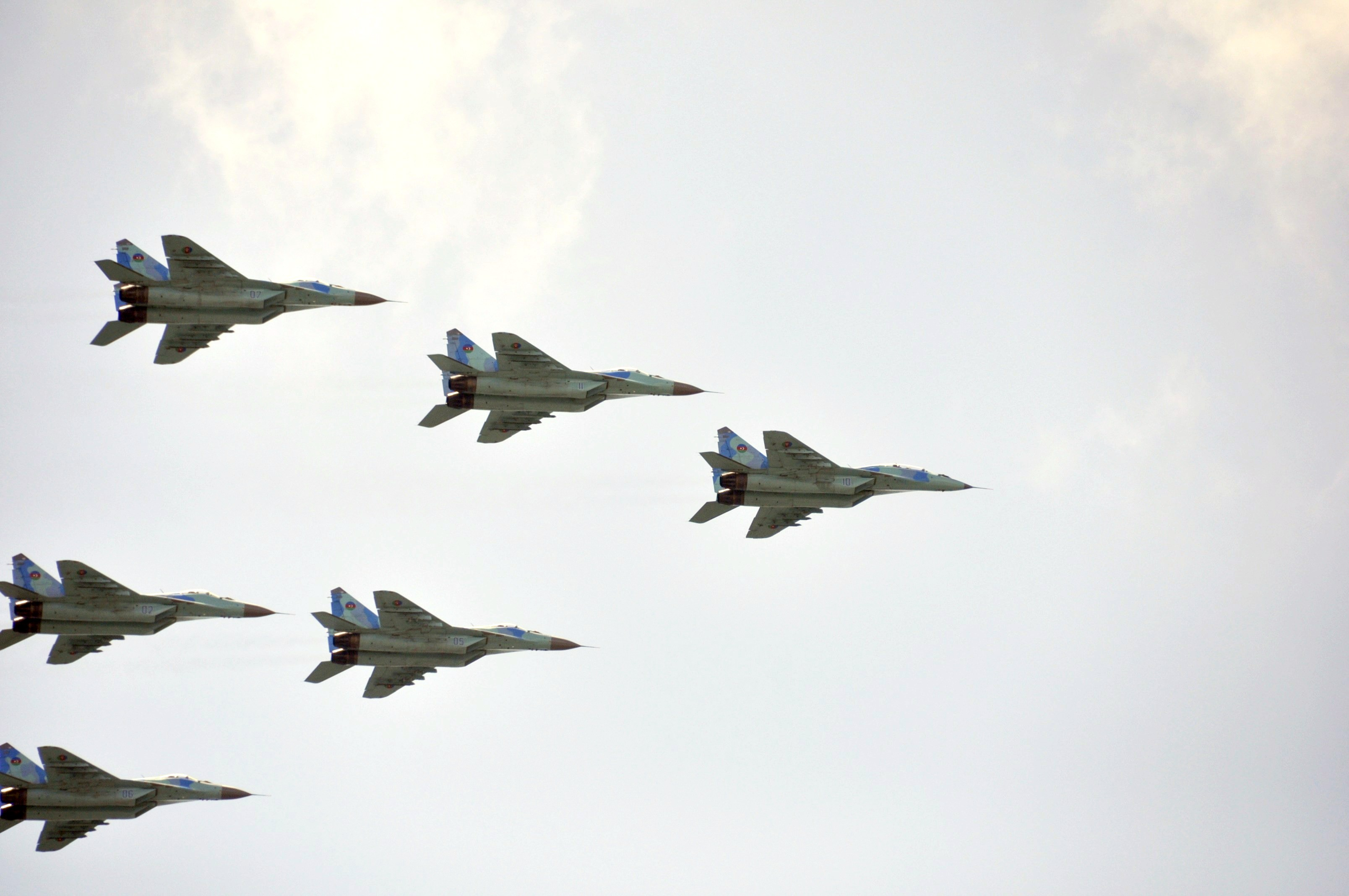
Azerbaijani Air Force MiG-29

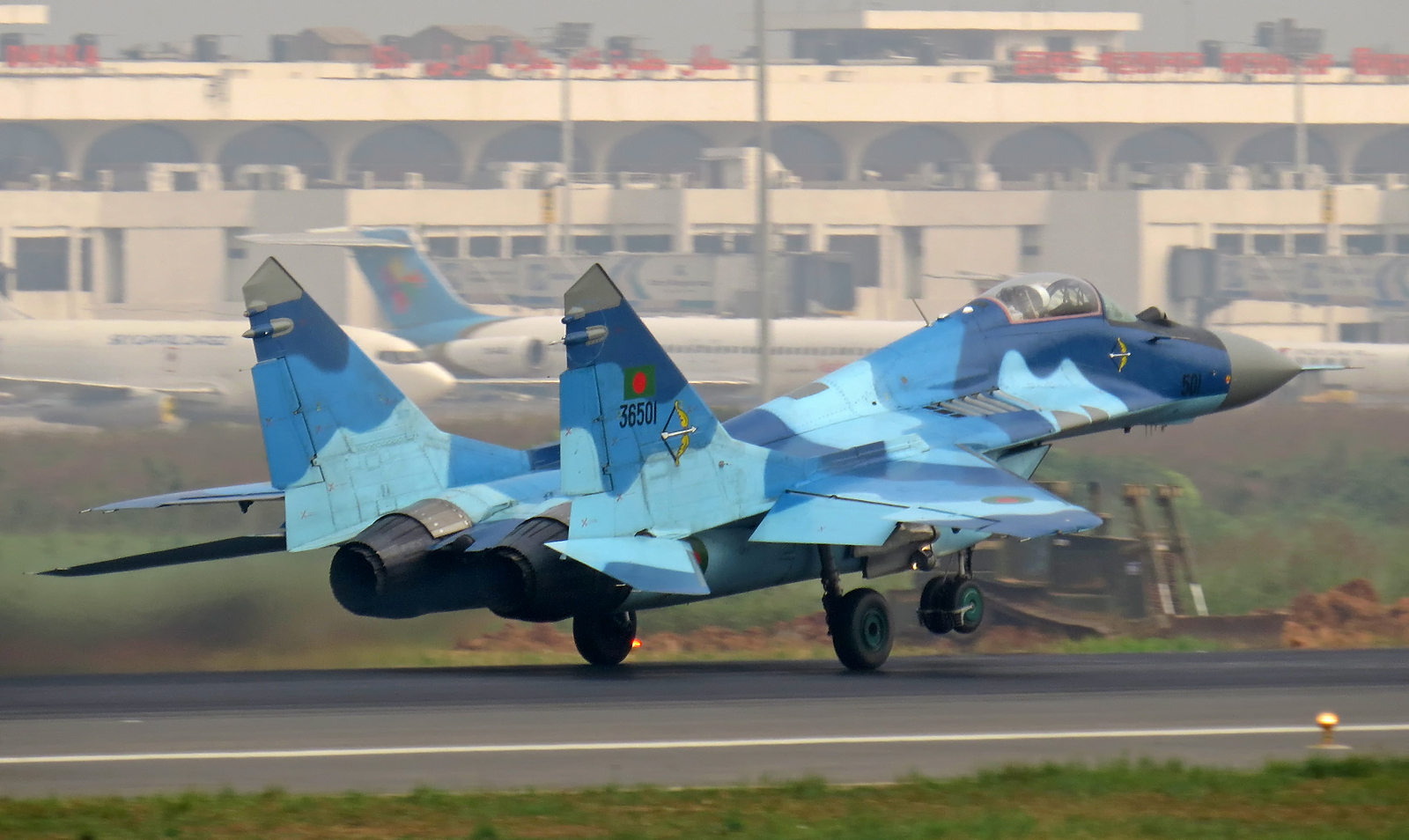
Bangladesh Air Force MiG-29SE 9.12SE (Note: 36501 was a 9.12SE) Fulcrum takes off from Shahjalal International Airport

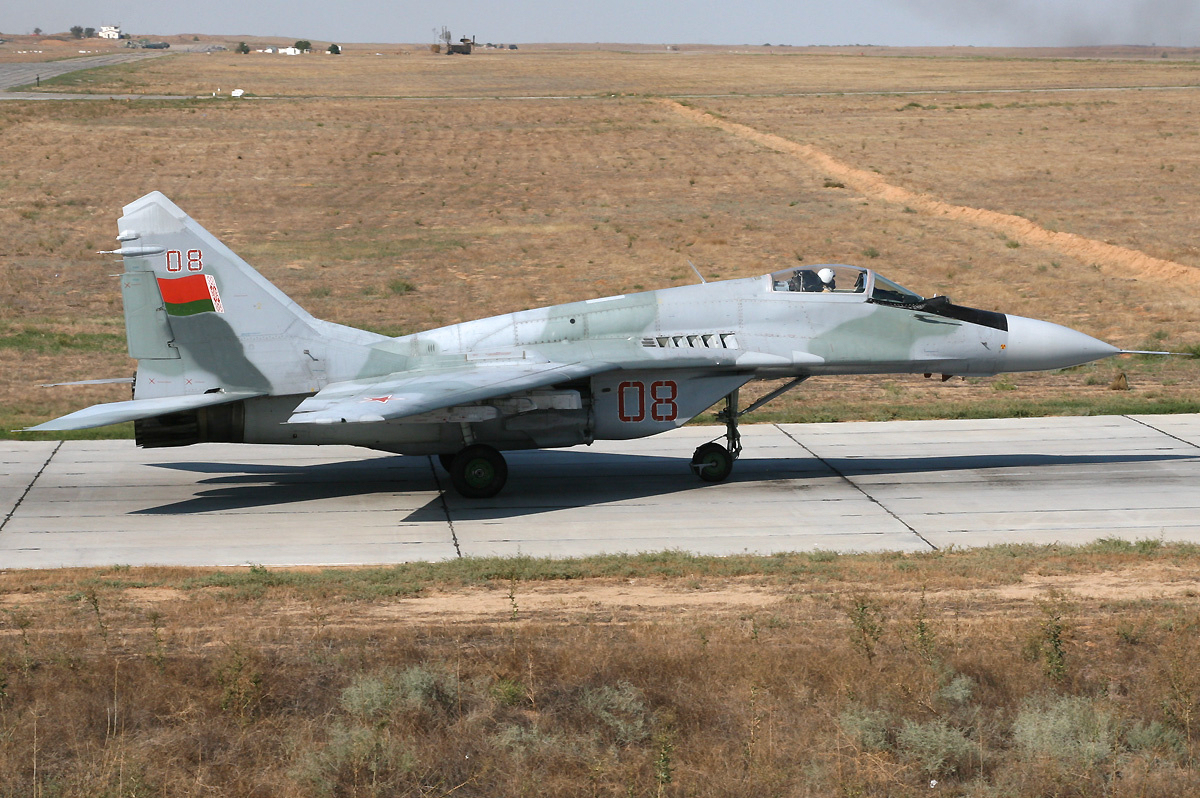
MiG-29 9.13 of the Belarusian Air Force

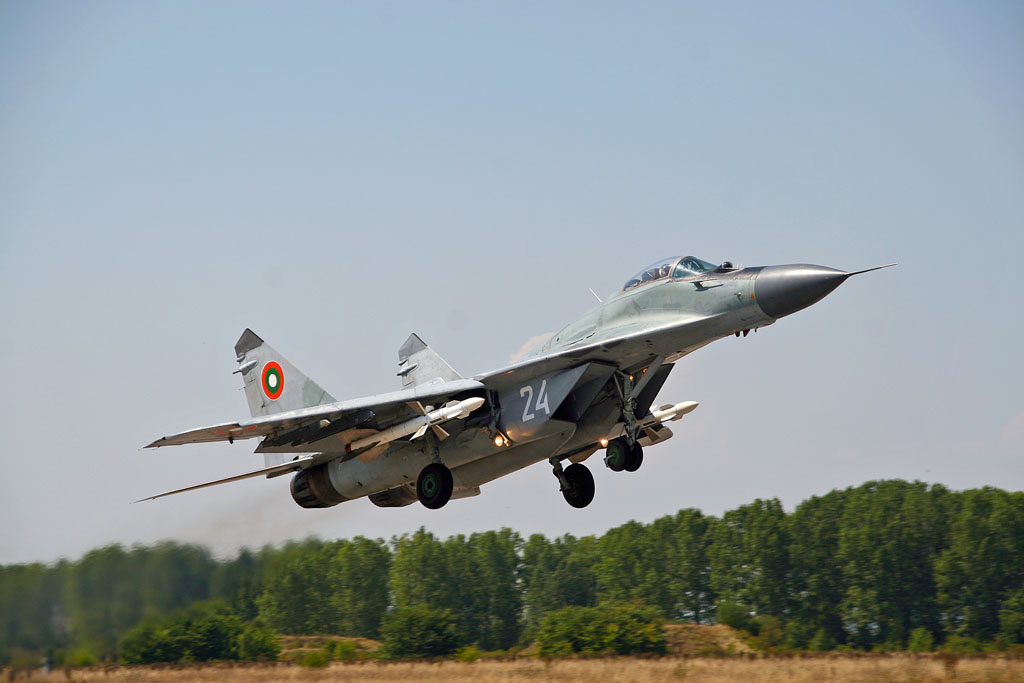
Bulgarian Air Force MiG-29

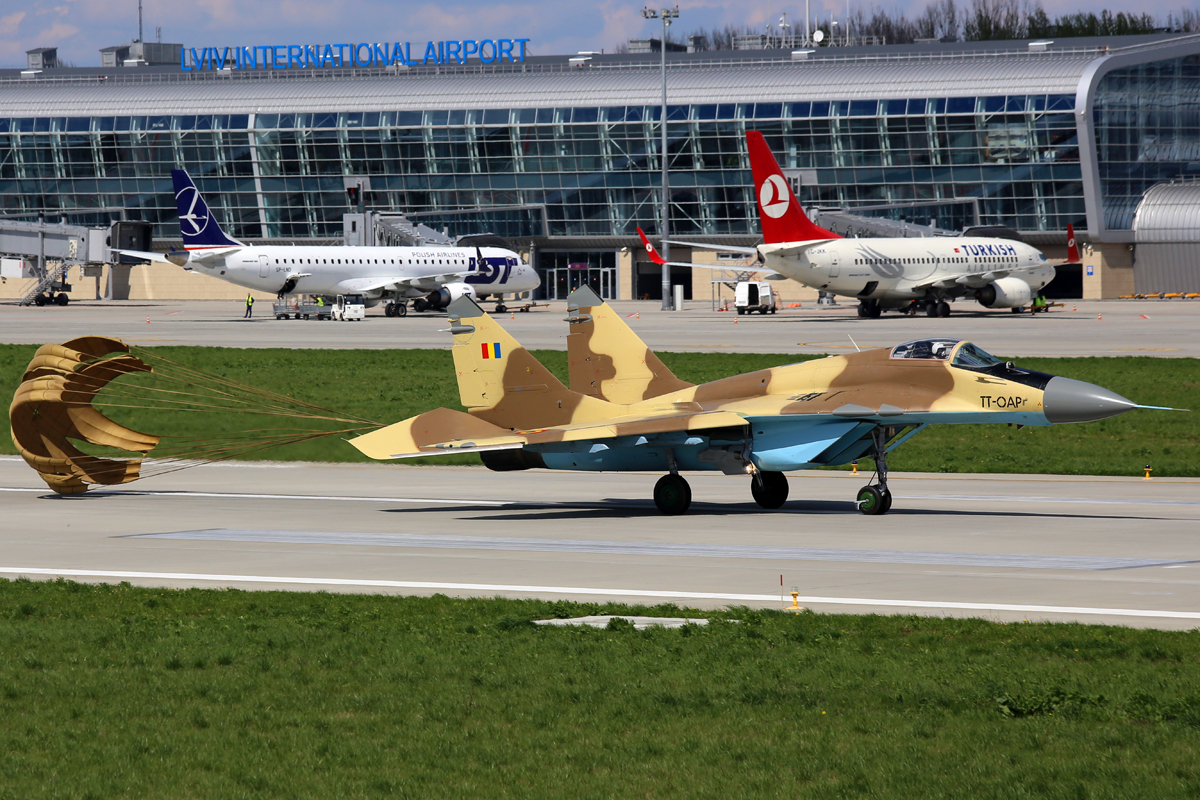
MiG-29 9.13 of the Chadian Air Force lands at Lviv International Airport

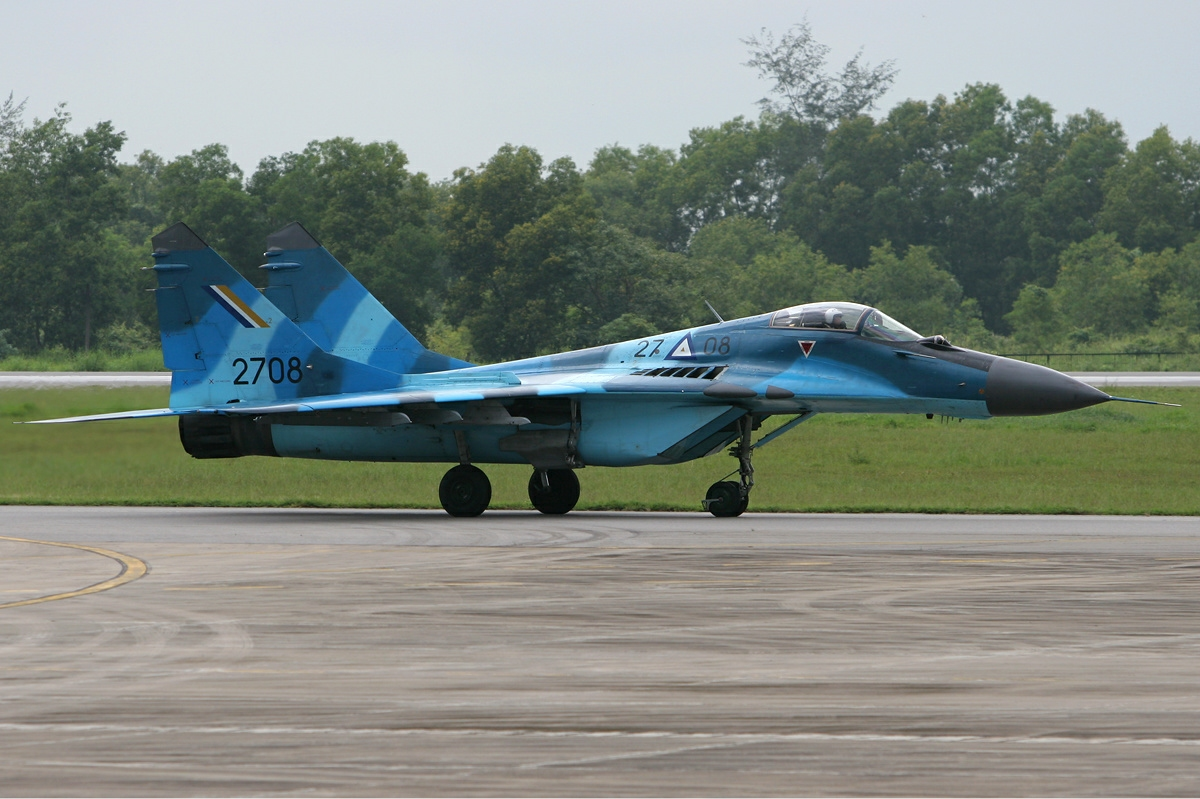
MiG-29 9.12B of the Myanmar Air Force

=== Current ===
Algeria

- Algerian Air Force – 26 MiG-29s in service in January 2014. 14 MiG-29M/M2s on order. As of 2023 there are 39 MiG-29 fighters and 1 UB trainer available, with 5 on order.

Azerbaijan

- Azerbaijani Air Forces – 12 MiG-29s and 3 UB trainers operational in 2023.

Bangladesh

- Bangladesh Air Force – 6 MiG-29SEs (9.12SE) and 2 MiG-29UBs in service as of 2021. Four MiG-29SEs were upgraded for life extension in Belarus. The rest were upgraded in 2021–2022.

Belarus

- Belarusian Air Force – 33 MiG-29s in inventory as of 2024

Bulgaria

- Bulgarian Air Force – 11 MiG-29s and 3 MiG-29UB used for conversion training in inventory as of 2025.

Egypt

- Egyptian Air Force – 46 MiG-29Ms delivered by 2021, with some lost on the ground in Sudan.

India

- Indian Air Force – 61 MiG-29s in service as of 2024.
- Indian Naval Air Arm – 42 MiG-29Ks in service as of 2024.

Libya

- Libyan National Army − Some MiG-29s in service as of February 2024. Operated by mercenary pilots.

Mongolia

- Mongolian Air Force - 6 MiG-29UBs in service as of December 2021. That number fell to 2 operational UBs in 2023.

Myanmar

- Myanmar Air Force – 31 MiG-29s (6 SE, 20 SM(mod) and 5 UB) in January 2015. 10 are upgraded to MiG-29SM(mod) standard. As of 2023, 28 fighters and 5 UB trainers remain.

North Korea

- North Korean Air Force – 35 MiG-29s as of July 2025.

Peru

- Peruvian Air Force – 19 MiG-29s in service as of February 2021 Only 6 were available by the end of 2023.

Poland

- Polish Air Force – 11 MiG-29s and 3 MiG-29UB used for conversion training in service as of 2025. 10 transferred to Ukraine in 2023.

Russia

- Russian Aerospace Forces – 87 total consisting of 70 MiG-29/MiG-29UB, 15 MiG-29SMT and 2 MiG-29UBT in service as of 2022. At least 256 MiG-29 in service according to World Air Forces as of 2025. As of 2026, the Russian Aerospace Forces and Naval Aviation operates 278 MiG-29s.
- Russian Naval Aviation – 24 Mikoyan MiG-29Ks

Serbia

- Serbian Air Force and Air Defence – 14 MiG-29s (5 MiG-29Аs, 3 MiG-29Bs, (Note: 9.12A and 9.12B) 3 MiG-29Ss, 3 MiG-29UBs) in inventory as of 2025. 11 of which are modernized to the advanced MiG-29SMT standards while 3 (MiG-29UB) are used as a conversion trainer.

Sudan

- Sudanese Air Force – 10 fighters and 1 UB trainer in service as of January 2023

Turkmenistan

- Turkmen Air Force – 24 MiG-29s in use as of 2023

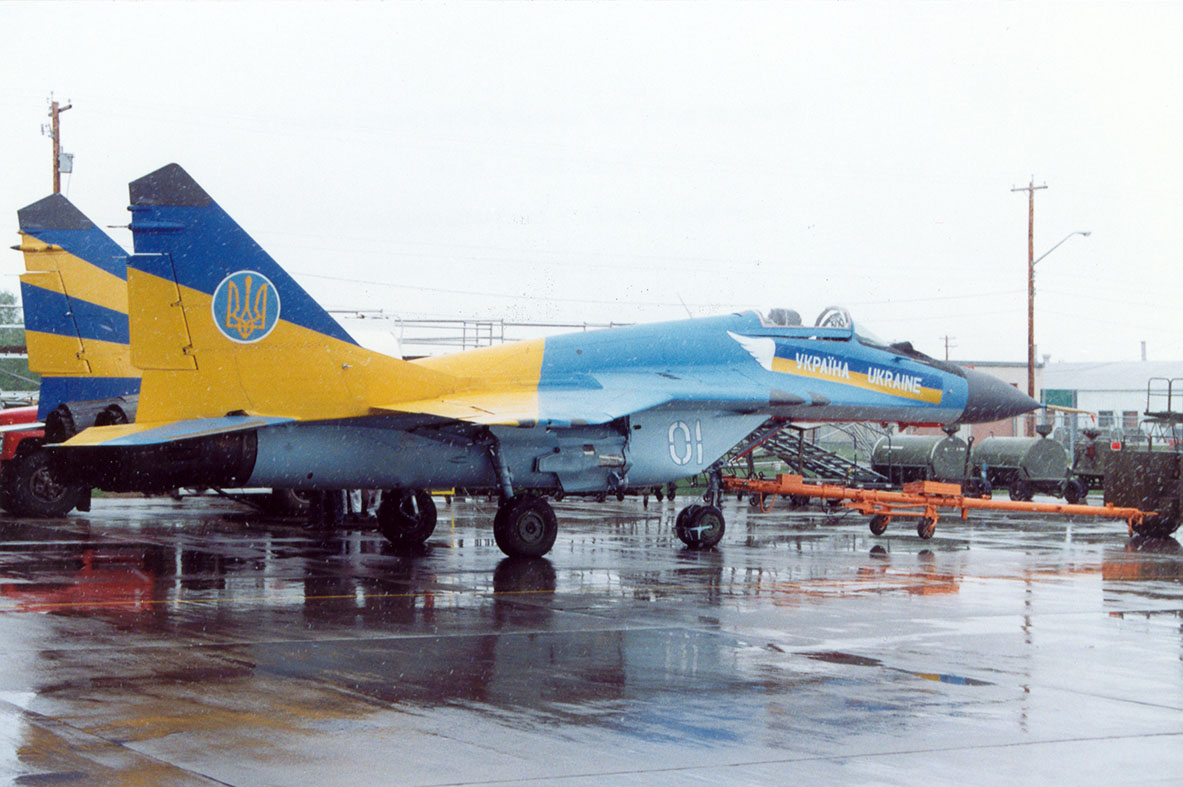
Ukrainian MiG-29 in 1992

Ukraine

- Ukrainian Air Force – Up to 240 inherited from the Soviet Union in 1991. About 58 were operational in 2022. 44 MiG-29s in service along with 9 MiG-29UB trainers as of 2025.

United States

- Used by private defense contractor RAVN Aerospace for adversary training services.

Uzbekistan

- Uzbekistan Air and Air Defence Forces – 60 MiG-29s were operation as of January 2014. Only 38 MiG 29s of all type were available in 2023.

Yemen

- Yemeni Air Force – 24 in service as of January 2017. All grounded because of civil war. Many were destroyed on the ground during the Saudi-led Operation Decisive Storm in 2015. 23 reported available in 2023.

=== Former ===
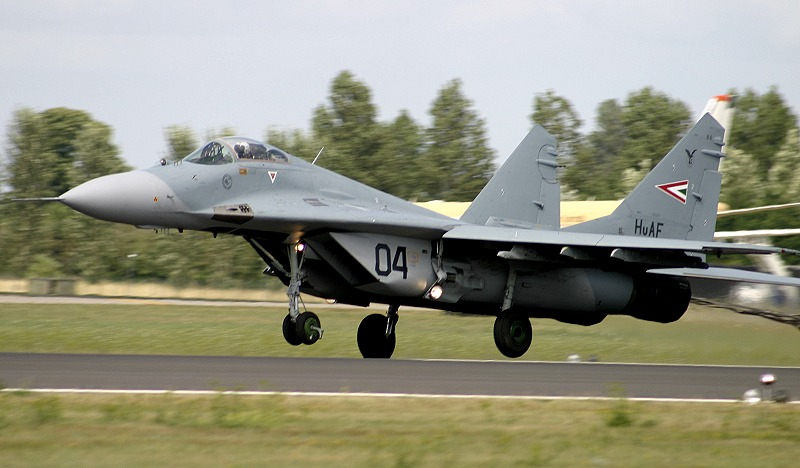
Hungarian Air Force MiG-29

Chad

- Chadian Air Force − Received 3 MiG-29s from Ukraine in 2015. None operational as of 2024.

Cuba

- Cuban Air Force – All fixed-wing aircraft retired in 2026.

Czechoslovakia

- Czechoslovak Air Force – Received 18 MiG-29s and two MiG-29UB aircraft. Although six were capable of delivering nuclear weapons, the necessary equipment for this was removed as per the CFE treaty. All passed onto successor states.

Czech Republic

- Czech Air Force – Inherited nine MiG-29 and one MiG-29UB. All sold to Poland in 1995 in exchange for 11 W-3A Sokol helicopters. Replaced with Saab JAS 39 Gripen.

Eritrea

- Eritrean Air Force – 7 MiG-29s in service as of 2022, but none active in 2023.

East Germany

- Air Forces of the National People's Army – 24 absorbed into the West German Air Force upon reunification

Germany

- German Air Force – One crashed, one on display, 22 sold to Poland in 2003 for €22 ($24.83).

Hungary

- Hungarian Air Force – 28 in inventory as of January 2011. Reportedly stored outside. The last fighter was retired in December 2010, at which point only 4 aircraft were still in operational condition. In 2011 the Hungarian government intended to sell six MiG-29 9.12 and two MiG-29UB aircraft. Replaced with JAS 39 Gripen but kept in reserve if needed. In October 2017, the Hungarian Air Force announced that 23 MiG-29s were to be auctioned off including engines and spare parts in November. The online auction had a reservation price of €8.7 million and failed to attract any bidders. This might have been because of an agreement between Hungary and Russia requiring the manufacturer's (Russia's) approval to transfer ownership of the aircraft.

Iraq

- Iraqi Air Force – Received 37 MiG-29s during Saddam Hussein's era (MiG-29 9.12B and MiG-29UB); these were destroyed or written off and nine were reportedly flown to Iran.

Israel

- Israeli Air Force – Leased from Poland in 1997.

Kazakhstan

- Kazakh Air and Air Defence Forces – 23 MiG-29s as of 2023. These were retired in 2023, put up for auction in October 2023, and reportedly sold in April 2024 to the US. It was speculated that these would be transferred to Ukraine as spare parts sources and/or decoys. In a later statement, the Kazakh state-owned weapons importer and exporter Kazspetexport denied such claims, saying that foreign companies were not allowed to bid.

Malaysia

- Royal Malaysian Air Force – Retired 15 MiG-29N and 2 MiG-29UB in 2017 for lack of spare parts and engine problem. Replaced with Sukhoi Su-30MKM.

Moldova

- Moldovan Air Force – Not operational, six MiG-29S in storage. In the 1990s, a total of six were sold to the US for type evaluation testing.

Romania

- Romanian Air Force – 17 MiG-29 9.12A and five MiG-29UB were delivered from 1989, 1 MiG-29S received from Moldova in 1992. Retired in 2003.

Serbia and Montenegro

- Air Force of Serbia and Montenegro – Inherited from Yugoslavia, six destroyed in 1999.

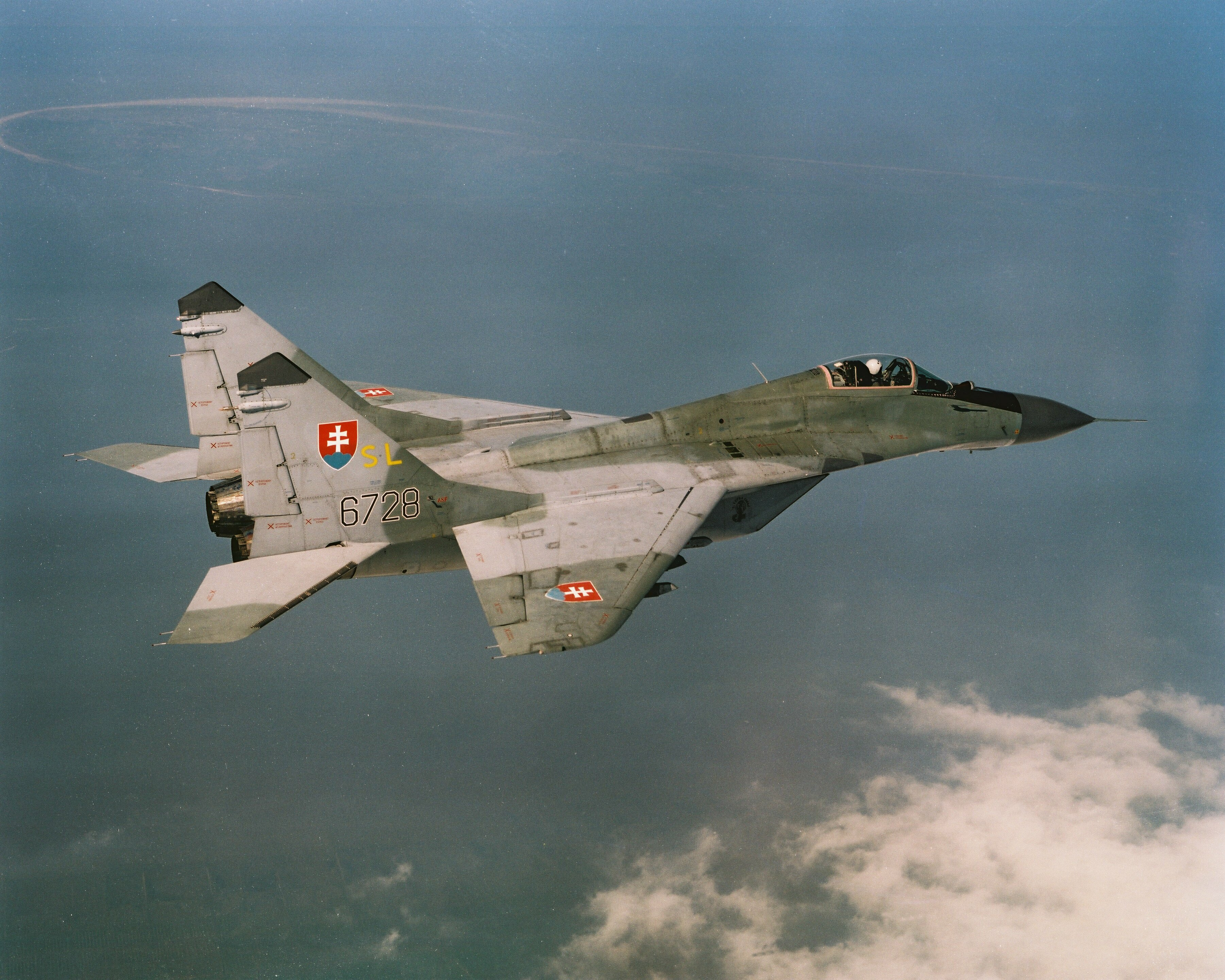
Slovak MiG-29 in 1999

Slovakia

- Slovak Air Force – Slovakia operated in total 24 MiG-29s. 9 MiG-29 9.12As and 1 MiG-29UB were inherited from Czechoslovakia. From 1993 to 1995 Slovakia ordered 12 additional MiG-29 9.12A and 2 MiG-29UB fighters as compensation for Russian debt. 12 aircraft were upgraded by the Russian Aircraft Corporation MiG and Western companies in 2007 and 2008 to fulfill the NATO requirements, and were maintained by Russian military technicians at Sliač Air Base. They were officially withdrawn from service on 31 August 2022. Slovakia's Foreign Minister Rastislav Káčer has said that his country is prepared to transfer their fleet of MiG-29s to Ukraine. He said: "We have not yet handed [Ukraine] the MiG-29s. But we are ready to do it. We are talking with our NATO partners about how to do it," and such a package would involve "several thousand" missiles. Slovakia transferred the first four of its MiG-29 fighter jets, from 13 to be sent to Ukraine on 24 March 2023.

South Yemen

- Democratic Republic of Yemen – Received between 6 and 12 MiG-29s from either Moldova and Russia, or Moldova only, in 1994.

Soviet Union

- Soviet Air Forces – Passed on to successor states.

Ba'athist Syria

- Syrian Arab Air Force − Had 20 MiG-29s in service with 12 more on order as of January 2017. 29 available as of 2023. After the fall of the Assad regime in 2024, the Israeli Air Force conducted airstrikes destroying the remaining assets to prevent them from falling into the rebels hands.

Syria

- Syrian Air Force – After the Fall of the Assad regime in 2024, Israeli airstrikes destroyed the remaining aircraft.

Yugoslavia

- Yugoslav Air Force – 14 MiG-29 and 2 MiG-29UB, passed on to Serbia and Montenegro.

== Preserved aircraft ==
=== Aircraft on display ===
Czech Republic

- On display at the Prague Aviation Museum in Prague.

Canada

- One MiG-29UB cockpit on display at Jet Aircraft Museum in London, Ontario, painted in Ukrainian colours.

Germany

- 29+03 – MiG-29G on display at the Luftwaffenmuseum der Bundeswehr in Berlin. This airframe is the only remaining German MiG-29 in Germany. It was previously on display in Laage before being moved to the Luftwaffenmuseum der Bundeswehr in 2006 as part of the exhibition "50 Jahre Luftwaffe".

Hungary

- One MiG-29 is on display with other older MiG planes and helicopters at The RepTár Museum of Szolnok, Hungary. (Note: Hungarian AF MiG-29 s/n 2960535148 was a 9.12A)

India

- KB-732 – On display as a gate guardian at Ojhar Air Force Station in Nasik, Maharashtra.
- KB-741 – On display at the Technical Type Training (TETTRA) School in Pune, Maharashtra.

Latvia

- 9-52 – MiG-29UB on display at the Riga Aviation Museum in Riga. This airframe is the second MiG-29UB prototype. After 213 test flights around Moscow between 23 August 1982 and 10 April 1986, it was disassembled and parts of the wings and tails were re-used in prototype (9–16). The remains were shipped to Riga Military Aviation Engineers High School, and later handed over to the Riga Aviation Museum in 1994, where it is currently displayed. The remains of this prototype is in a very bad condition, with open fuselage panels and a partly broken canopy.

Malaysia

- M43-06 – MiG-29N on display as gate guardian at Al-Sultan Abdullah Camp in Kuantan.
- M43-14 – MiG-29N on display as a monument in Dataran Pahlawan complex, Putrajaya.

Poland

- MiG-29G on display at the Muzeum Wojska Polskiego in Warsaw.
- MiG-29GT on display at the Polish Aviation Museum in Kraków. This aircraft was sold by Germany to Poland in 2002 and briefly served in the Polish Air Force.

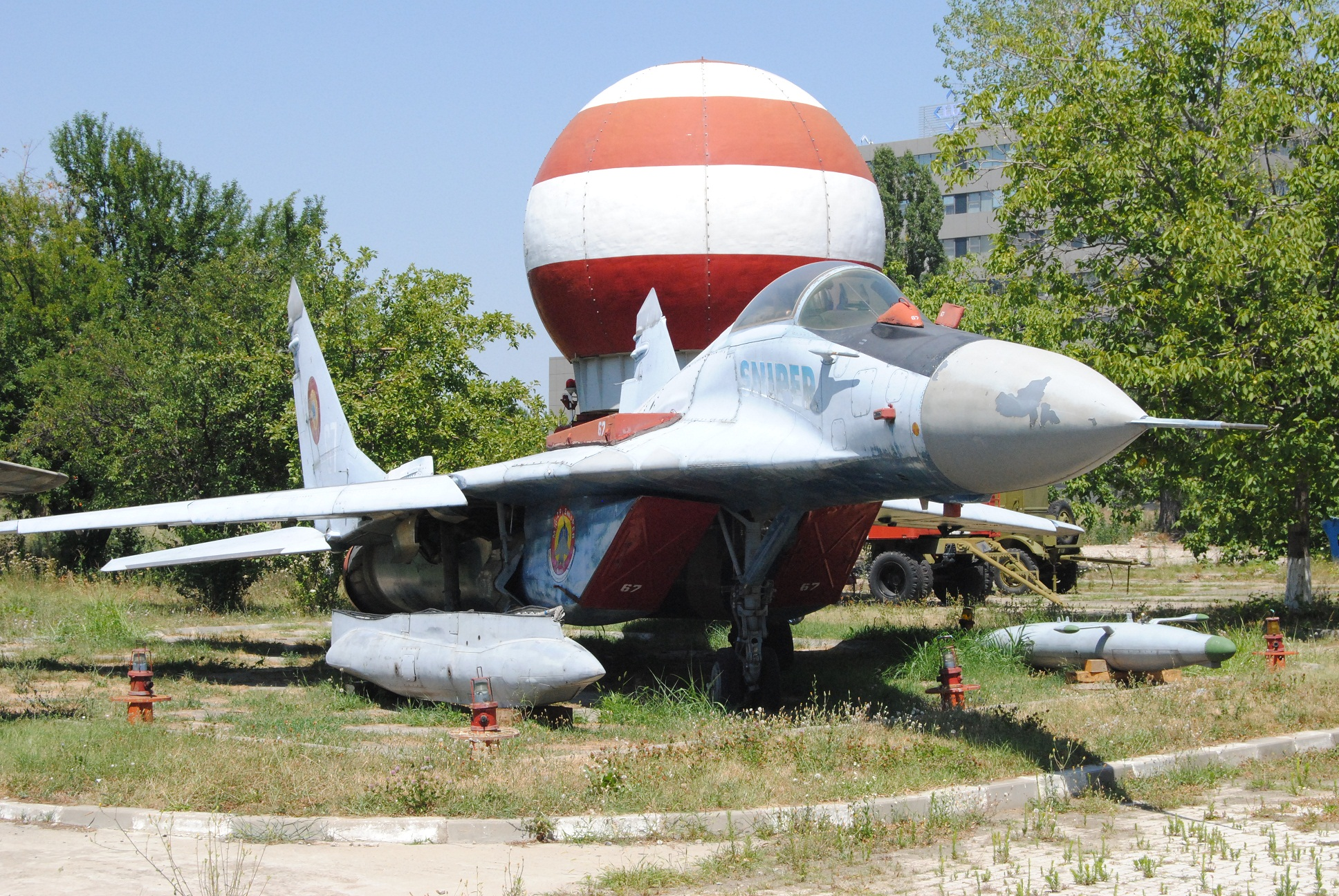
MiG-29 Sniper on display

Romania

- 67 – On display at the National Museum of Romanian Aviation in Bucharest.

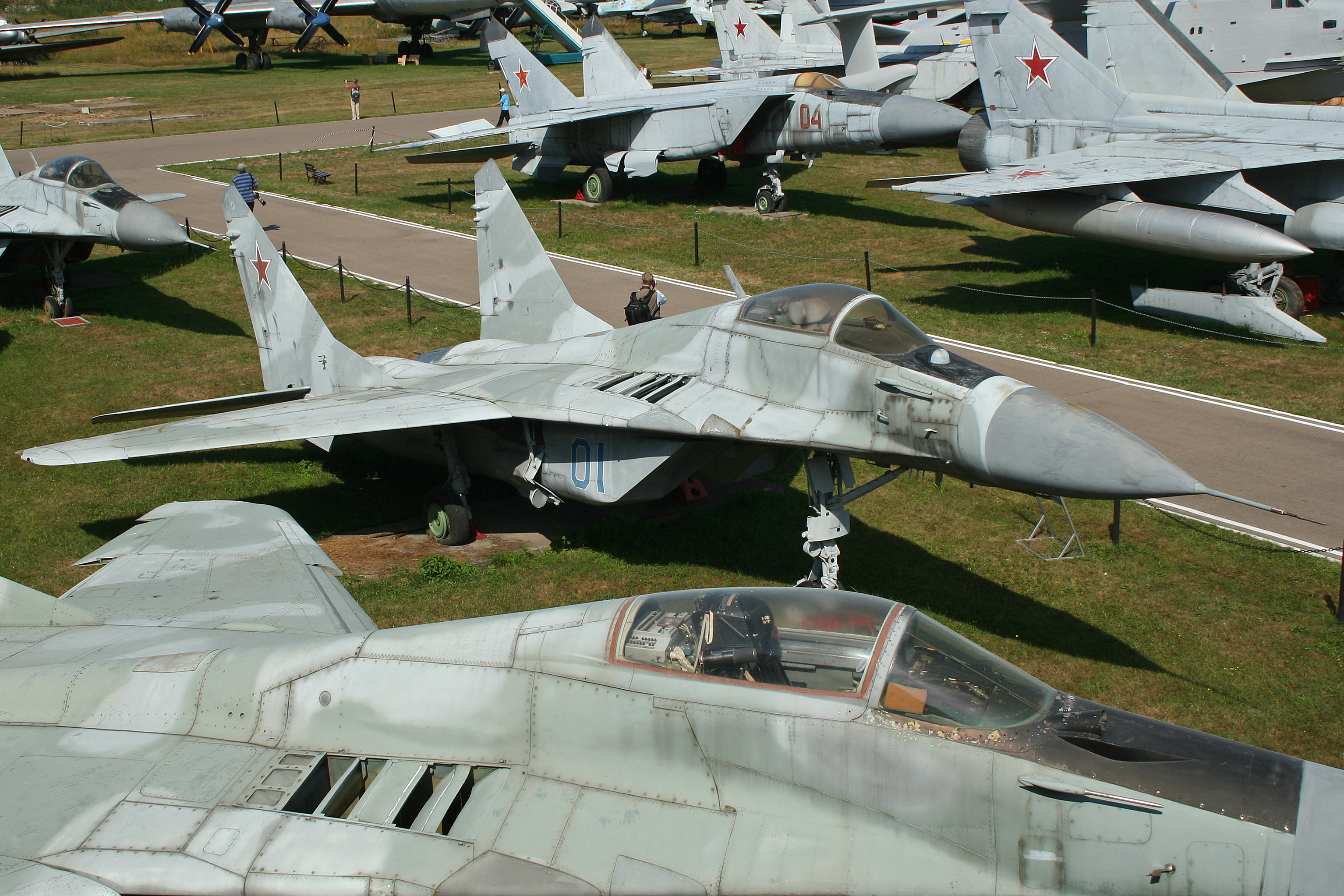
First prototype MiG-29 on display at the Central Air Force Museum in Monino

Russia

- On display at the Central Air Force Museum in Monino. Painted as "Blue 01".This airframe is the first prototype MiG-29.
- On display at the Central Air Force Museum in Monino. Painted as "Blue 03".
- 2960710039 – MiG-29 9.13 On display at the Central Air Force Museum in Monino. Painted as "Blue 70".
- 2960718121 – MiG-29 9.13 On display at the Central Air Force Museum in Monino. Painted as "Blue 51".
- On display at the Central Air Force Museum in Monino. Painted as "Blue 18". This airframe is a MiG-29KVP.
- 2960705560 – On display at the Museum of the Great Patriotic War in Moscow. Painted as "Blue 26".
- On display at the Vadim Zadorozhny Technical Museum in Khimki. Painted as "Blue 04".
- On display at the Central Armed Forces Museum in Moscow. Painted as "Red 02",

Slovakia

- 8605 – MiG-29 9.12A on display in Museum of Aviation in Košice
- 7501 – MiG-29 9.12A on display at Sliač Air Force Base in Sliač. Normally not accessible to public.
- 9308 – MiG-29 9.12A on display in Vojenské historické múzeum Piešťany (Military History Museum Piešťany) in Piešťany.
- 5817 – MiG-29 9.12A on display in Vojenské historické múzeum Piešťany
- 5515 – MiG-29 9.12A on display in Vojenské historické múzeum Piešťany.

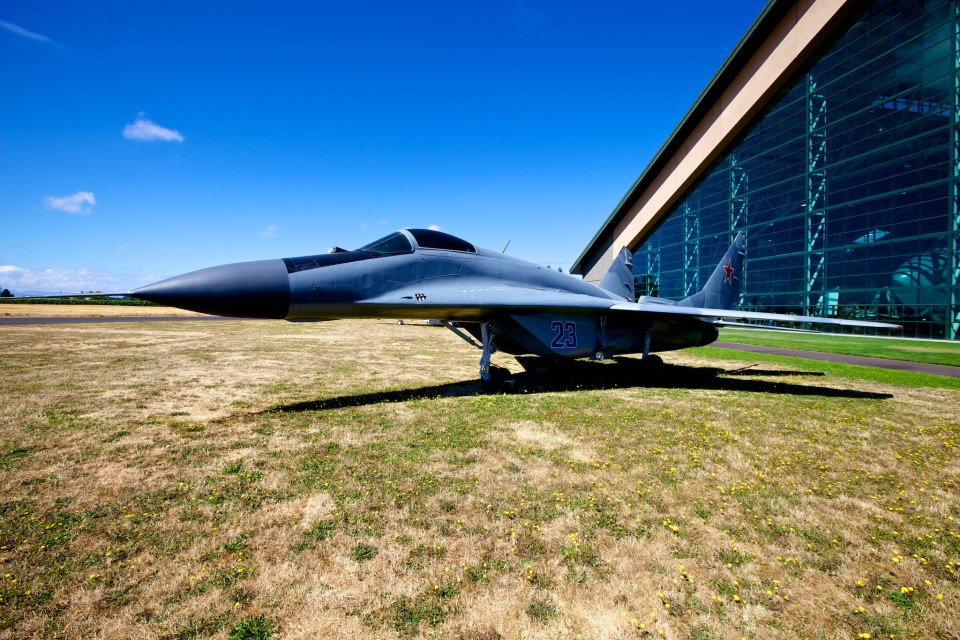
MiG-29 on display in McMinnville, Oregon

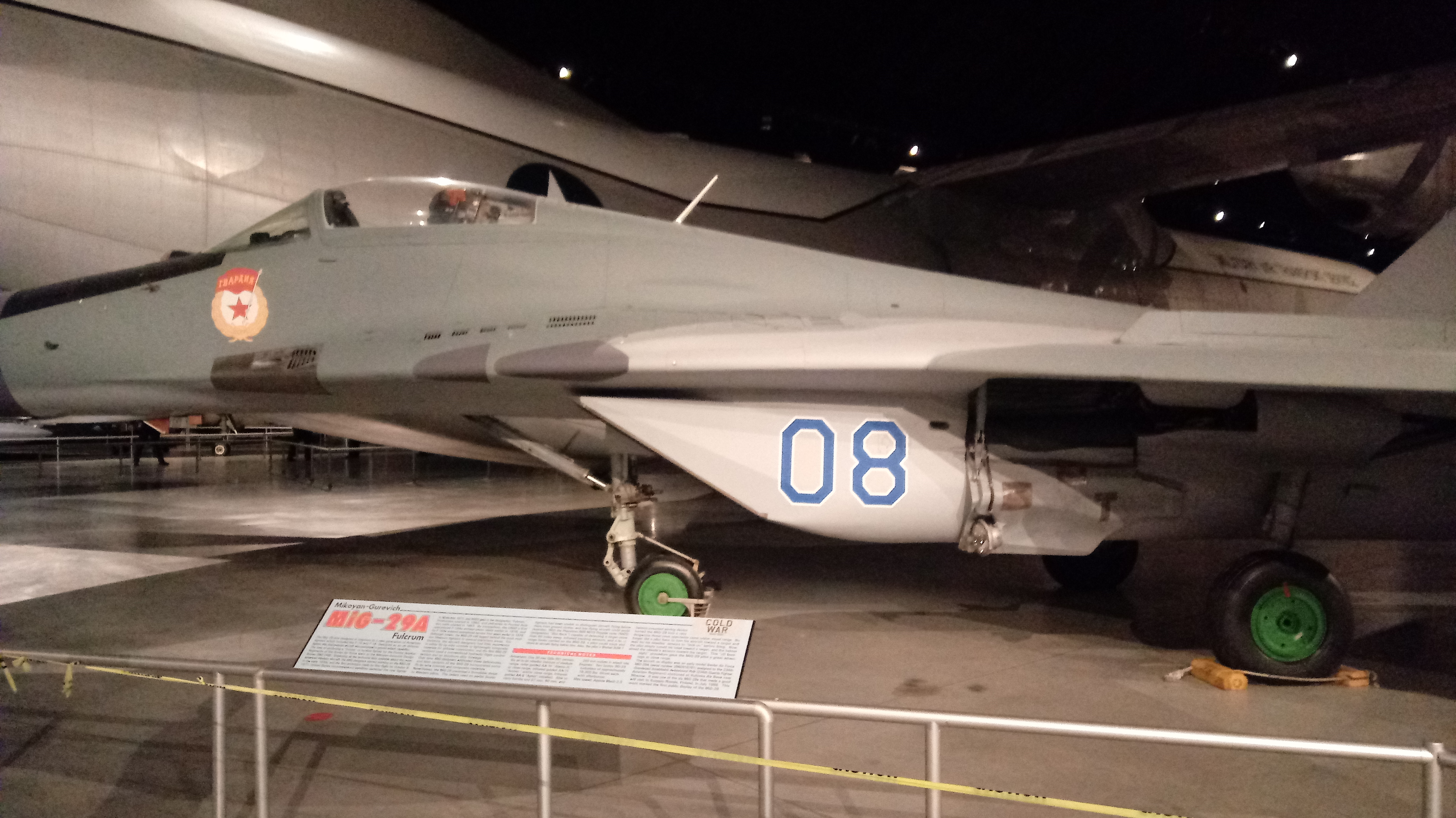
MiG-29 9.12A at the National Museum of the United States Air Force in Dayton, Ohio

United States

- 2960512124 – MiG-29 9.12 On display at Goodfellow Air Force Base in San Angelo, Texas.
- 2960717458 – MiG-29 9.13 On display at the airpark at Naval Air Station Fallon near Fallon, Nevada.
- 2960717473 – MiG-29 9.13 On display at the Threat Training Facility at Nellis Air Force Base near North Las Vegas, Nevada.
- 2960516761 – MiG-29 9.12 on display in the Cold War Gallery of the National Museum of the United States Air Force at Wright-Patterson Air Force Base in Dayton, Ohio.
- 2960516766 – MiG-29 9.12 On display at the Pima Air and Space Museum in Tucson, Arizona.
- 2960721930 – MiG-29 9.13 On display at the Evergreen Aviation and Space Museum in McMinnville, Oregon.
- 50903012038 – MiG-29UB on display at the National Air and Space Intelligence Center at Wright-Patterson Air Force Base in Dayton, Ohio.

=== Airworthy ===
- N29UB – MiG-29UB owned by Jared Isaacman. It was previously owned by the Flying Heritage Collection in Everett, Washington. The aircraft was obtained from Ukraine in early 2009. The aircraft has an FAA approved maintenance program and is flyable.
- N129XX – MiG-29UB owned by RAVN Aerospace (formerly Air USA) and located at the Quincy Regional Airport in Quincy, Illinois. This aircraft was purchased by Don Kirlin from Kyrgyzstan. It is available for contract training and flight testing.
- Two MiG-29UBs in flying condition were offered for sale from Eastern Europe in spring 2009. These aircraft come from the same source as the flyable aircraft (N129UB) previously owned by the Historic Flight Foundation and now owned by Jared Isaacman.

== Specifications (MiG-29) ==
3-view line drawing of the Mikoyan MiG-29

Data from Mikoyan, Airforce technology, Deagel, Business World

General characteristics

- Crew: 1
- Length: 17.32 m (56 ft 10 in)
- Wingspan: 11.36 m (37 ft 3 in)
- Height: 4.73 m (15 ft 6 in)
- Wing area: 38 m^{2} (410 sq ft)
- Empty weight: 11,000 kg (24,251 lb)
- Gross weight: 14,900 kg (32,849 lb)
- Max takeoff weight: 18,000 kg (39,683 lb)
- Fuel capacity: 3,500 kg (7,716 lb) internal
- Powerplant: 2 × Klimov RD-33 afterburning turbofan engines, 49.42 kN (11,110 lbf) thrust each dry, 81.58 kN (18,340 lbf) with afterburner

Performance

- Maximum speed: 2,450 km/h (1,520 mph, 1,320 kn) at high altitude
- Maximum speed: Mach 2.3+
- Range: 1,430 km (890 mi, 770 nmi) with maximum internal fuel
- Combat range: 700–900 km (430–560 mi, 380–490 nmi) with 2 x R-27s, 4 x R-73s at high altitude
- Ferry range: 2,100 km (1,300 mi, 1,100 nmi) with 1× drop tank
- Service ceiling: 18,000 m (59,000 ft)
- g limits: +9
- Rate of climb: 330 m/s (65,000 ft/min)
- Wing loading: 403 kg/m^{2} (83 lb/sq ft)
- Thrust/weight: 1.09

Armament

- Guns: 1 × 30 mm Gryazev-Shipunov GSh-30-1 autocannon. Originally held 150 rounds, reduced to 100 on later variants.
- Hardpoints: 7 × hardpoints (6 × underwing, 1 × fuselage) with a capacity of up to 4,000 kg (8,800 lb) of stores, with provisions to carry combinations of:
  - Rockets:
    - S-5
    - S-8
    - S-24
  - Missiles:
    - 2-4 × R-27R/ER/T/ET/P/EP air-to-air missiles
    - 6 × R-60/R-60M AAMs
    - 6 × R-73 AAMs (later variants also carry the R-73M, R-74 and R-74M)
    - 4 × Astra (Indian Air Force)
    - Rampage (Indian Air Force)
    - AGM-88 HARM (Integration by Ukrainian Air Force during the 2022 Russian invasion of Ukraine)
    - 2 × Kh-29T/TE (MiG-29SMT, MiG-29M/M2, MiG-29K/KR and MiG-35 only)
    - 6 × R-77 (MiG-29S, MiG-29M/M2 & MiG-29K only)
    - 2 × CM-400 (Serbian Air Force MiG-29SM)
  - Bombs:
    - 6 × 665 kg (1,466 lb) bombs
    - 4 × FAB-500-M62 500kg general purpose bomb
    - 4 × FAB-250-M62 250kg general purpose bomb
    - 4 × BETAB-500 500kg concrete piercing bomb
    - 4 × KMGU-AO2/PTAB munitions dispenser
    - 4 × RBK-500-PTAB/255-PTAB 500kg cluster bomb
    - 4 × RBK-250-PTAB/275-AO 250kg cluster bomb
    - 4 x LS-6 precision-guided bomb kit (Serbian Air Force MiG-29SM)
    - Smart Anti-Airfield Weapon (Indian MiG-29s)
  - Other:
    - 1 × 1400 L external drop tank
    - 2 × 1100 L external drop tank

Avionics

- Radar depands in variants: N019 family radar or Phazotron Zhuk-M (export designation Zhuk-ME) radar
- OEPS-29 IRST
- SPO-15 'Beryoza' RWR
- DARE D-29 EW system (on MiG-29 UPG)

== Accidents and incidents ==
The Indian air force and navy have purchased 80 and 45 aircraft of their respective variants, and have lost 20 and five aircraft from 1989 to 2024, respectively.

- On 23 February 2017, a Belarusian Air Force MiG-29BM crashed. The engine caught fire during takeoff, but the pilot ejected safely at Bobruisk, Mogilev Region.
- On 8 May 2020, an IAF MiG-29 from the 223 Squadron crashed near Jalandhar in Punjab with its pilot ejected safely after the aircraft failed to respond.
- On 2 September 2024, a MiG-29 (KBU-3112) of IAF's 47 Squadron crashed during a night training mission in an unpopulated area near Uttarlai of Barmer district in Rajasthan due to technical reasons, and the pilot ejected safely.
- On 4 November 2024, a MiG-29 (KBU-711) of the 28 Squadron crashed en route from Adampur to Agra during a routine training mission due to technical issues. The aircraft stalled and eventually entered a flat spin before the crash, with the pilot ejecting safely.

== See also ==
- Fourth-generation fighter
- Ghost of Kyiv

Related development

- Mikoyan MiG-29K
- Mikoyan MiG-29M
- Mikoyan MiG-35

Aircraft of comparable role, configuration, and era

- AIDC F-CK-1 Ching-kuo
- Dassault Mirage 2000
- General Dynamics F-16 Fighting Falcon
- McDonnell Douglas F/A-18 Hornet

Related lists

- List of fighter aircraft
- List of military aircraft of the Soviet Union and the CIS

== Bibliography ==
- Cooper, Tom (2018a). Hot Skies Over Yemen. Vol. 2: Aerial Warfare Over the South Arabian Peninsula, 1994–2017. Warwick, UK: Helion & Co. ISBN 978-1-911628-18-7.
- Cooper, Tom (2018b). MiG-23 Flogger in the Middle East: Mikoyan i Gurevich MiG-23 in Service in Algeria, Egypt, Iraq, Libya and Syria, 1973–2018. Warwick, UK: Helion & Co. ISBN 978-1-912390-32-8.
- Cooper, Tom; Weinert, Peter; Hinz, Fabian; Lepko, Mark (2011). African MiGs. Vol. 2: Madagascar to Zimbabwe. Houston, TX: Harpia Publishing. ISBN 978-0-9825539-8-5.
- Cooper, Tom; Fontanellaz, Adrien; Sipos, Milos (2024). War in Ukraine: Volume 6: The Air War February−March 2022 (ePub ed.). Warwick, UK: Helion and Company. ISBN 978-1-80451-698-0.
- Day, Jerry (April 2009). "Hot Hot Hot!". Air Classics. 45 (4).
- Eden, Paul, ed. (2004). "Mikoyan MiG-29 Fulcrum". Encyclopedia of Modern Military Aircraft. London: Amber Books. ISBN 1-904687-84-9.
- Gordon, Yefim (1999). Mikoyan MiG-29 Fulcrum: Multi-role Fighter. MBI Publishing. ISBN 0-7603-0764-4. OCLC 1150808027.
- Gordon, Yefim; Davison, Peter (2005). Mikoyan Gurevich MiG-29 Fulcrum. North Branch, MN: Specialty Press. ISBN 978-1-58007-085-0.
- Gordon, Yefim (2006). Mikoyan MiG-29. Famous Russian Aircraft. translated by Dimitriy Komissarov. Midland Publishing. ISBN 978-1-85780-231-3 – via Internet Archive.
- Hoyle, Craig, ed. (2025). "World Air Forces 2026". FlightGlobal. Flight International.
- International Institute for Strategic Studies (2024). "Chapter Six: Middle East and North Africa". The Military Balance. 124 (1): 328–395. doi:10.1080/04597222.2024.2298594. ISSN 0459-7222.
- Jenkins, Dennis R. (1998). McDonnell Douglas F-15 Eagle: Supreme Heavy-Weight Fighter. Arlington, TX: Aerofax. ISBN 1-85780-081-8.
- Lake, Jon (1990). "Mikoyan MiG-29 'Fulcrum'". World Air Power Journal. 4. Aerospace Publishing: 44–91. ISBN 1-874023-06-9. ISSN 0959-7050.
- Lake, Jon (1997). Jane's How to Fly and Fight in the Mikoyan MiG-29. New York: HarperCollins. ISBN 0-00-472144-6.
- Lake, Jon (Spring 1999). "Variant Briefing: Mikoyan MiG-29". World Air Power Journal. 36: 108–135.
- Lambert, Mark (1993). Jane's All the World's Aircraft 1993–94. Coulsdon, UK: Jane's Data Division. ISBN 0-7106-1066-1.
- North, David M. (1990). MiG-29 Pilot Report (PDF) (Report). Aviation Week. Archived from the original (PDF) on 26 February 2015.
- Spick, Mike, ed. (2000). "MiG-29 'Fulcrum'". Great Book of Modern Warplanes. St. Paul, MN: MBI Publishing. ISBN 0-7603-0893-4.
