= United Nations Security Council Resolution 1741 =

UN Security Council Resolution 1741
- UNMEE ribbon
- Date: 30 January 2007
- Meeting no.: 5,626
- Code: S/RES/1741 (Document)
- Subject: The situation between Eritrea and Ethiopia
- Voting summary: 15 voted for; None voted against; None abstained
- Result: Adopted

Security Council composition
- Permanent members: China; France; Russia; United Kingdom; United States
- Non-permanent members: Belgium; Rep. of the Congo; Ghana; Indonesia; Italy; Panama; Peru; Qatar; Slovakia; South Africa

United Nations Security Council Resolution 1741, adopted unanimously on January 30, 2007, after reaffirming all resolutions on the situation between Eritrea and Ethiopia, particularly resolutions 1320 (2000), 1430 (2003), 1466 (2003), 1640 (2005), 1681 (2006) and 1710 (2006), the Council extended the mandate of the United Nations Mission in Ethiopia and Eritrea (UNMEE) for a period of six months until July 31, 2007.

== Resolution ==
=== Observations ===
The Security Council reaffirmed its support for the peace process between the two countries and the full implementation of the Algiers Agreement and decision of the Eritrea-Ethiopia Boundary Commission (EEBC) which was important for lasting peace in the region.

It reaffirmed the integrity of and respect for the Temporary Security Zone (TSZ), and commended UNMEE for operating under difficult circumstances.

=== Acts ===
The mandate of UNMEE was extended by six months. The Council approved the reconfiguration of UNMEE's troop levels from 2,300 to 1,700 military personnel, including 230 military observers. It demanded that Eritrea comply with Resolution 1640 by removing its troops and equipment from the TSZ while Ethiopia had to accept the ruling of the EEBC decision on the mutual border. Furthermore, both Ethiopia and Eritrea had to exercise maximum restraint and refrain from threats and the use of force.

Meanwhile, regretting the lack of progress on demarcation, the Council called on all parties to fully co-operate with the EEBC in the demarcation process and to provide UNMEE with the necessary assistance, support, protection and access required.

The international community was requested to provide continued support for UNMEE and contributions towards the trust fund established in Resolution 1177 (1998). The Secretary-General Ban Ki-moon was required to submit a progress report by the end of April 2007.

== See also ==
- Badme
- Eritrean–Ethiopian War
- List of United Nations Security Council Resolutions 1701 to 1800 (2006–2008)
