= United Nations Security Council Resolution 1398 =

UN Security Council Resolution 1398
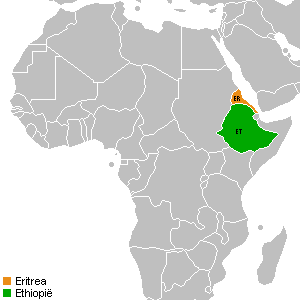
- Eritrea (orange) and Ethiopia (green) in East Africa
- Date: 15 March 2002
- Meeting no.: 4,494
- Code: S/RES/1398 (Document)
- Subject: The situation between Eritrea and Ethiopia
- Voting summary: 15 voted for; None voted against; None abstained
- Result: Adopted

Security Council composition
- Permanent members: China; France; Russia; United Kingdom; United States
- Non-permanent members: Bulgaria; Cameroon; Colombia; Guinea; Ireland; Mauritius; Mexico; Norway; Singapore; Syria

United Nations Security Council resolution 1398, adopted unanimously on 15 March 2002, after reaffirming resolutions 1298 (1999), 1308 (2000), 1312 (2000), 1320 (2000), 1344 (2001) and 1369 (2001) on the situation between Eritrea and Ethiopia, the council extended the mandate of the United Nations Mission in Ethiopia and Eritrea (UNMEE) until 15 September 2002.

== Resolution ==
=== Observation ===
From 21 to 25 February 2002, a mission of the security council had taken place to Ethiopia and Eritrea. Both parties had to fulfil their obligations under international law, including international humanitarian, human rights and refugee law and ensure safety of all United Nations and humanitarian personnel. The council reaffirmed its support of the Algiers Agreements signed in 2000 between both parties. It recognised that the United Nations had played a supporting role in the peaceful settlement of the dispute.

=== Acts ===
The security council welcomed an anticipated final legal settlement on the border issues between the two countries, and that the decision of the Boundary Commission would be final and binding. It commended both parties for progress made in implementing the Algiers Agreements and the observance of the Temporary Security Zone (TSZ), and the parties were further urged to co-operate with UNMEE in the course of its mandate. The implementation of the ruling of the Boundary Commission was emphasised, and the transfer of civil authority and territory had to take place in an orderly manner through dialogue. UNMEE would continue to operate its mandate until border demarcation was completed, and the Secretary-General Kofi Annan was asked to make suggestions on how UNMEE could play a part in this process and in demining.

Addressing the parties, the resolution called upon Eritrea to allow freedom of movement to UNMEE personnel and disclose details about its militia and police operating in the TSZ, while Ethiopia was requested to make clarifications on information it provided to the Mine Action Coordination Centre. There was concern that an air corridor had not been established between Asmara and Addis Ababa and both sides were urged to release prisoners of war under the auspicies of the International Committee of the Red Cross. Furthermore, the parties were asked to adopt confidence-building measures including by affording each other's nationals humane treatment; facilitate the return of refugees, internally displaced persons and demobilised soldiers; and facilitating dialogue and cross-border contacts.

The parties were urged to enable UNMEE to disseminate information about the delimitation and demarcation of the Eritrea-Ethiopia border and to focus on economic development and their diplomatic relations. Finally, all countries were asked to discourage arms flows to the region.

== See also ==
- Badme
- Eritrean–Ethiopian War
- List of United Nations Security Council Resolutions 1301 to 1400 (2000–2002)
