= United Nations Security Council Resolution 1710 =

UN Security Council Resolution 1710
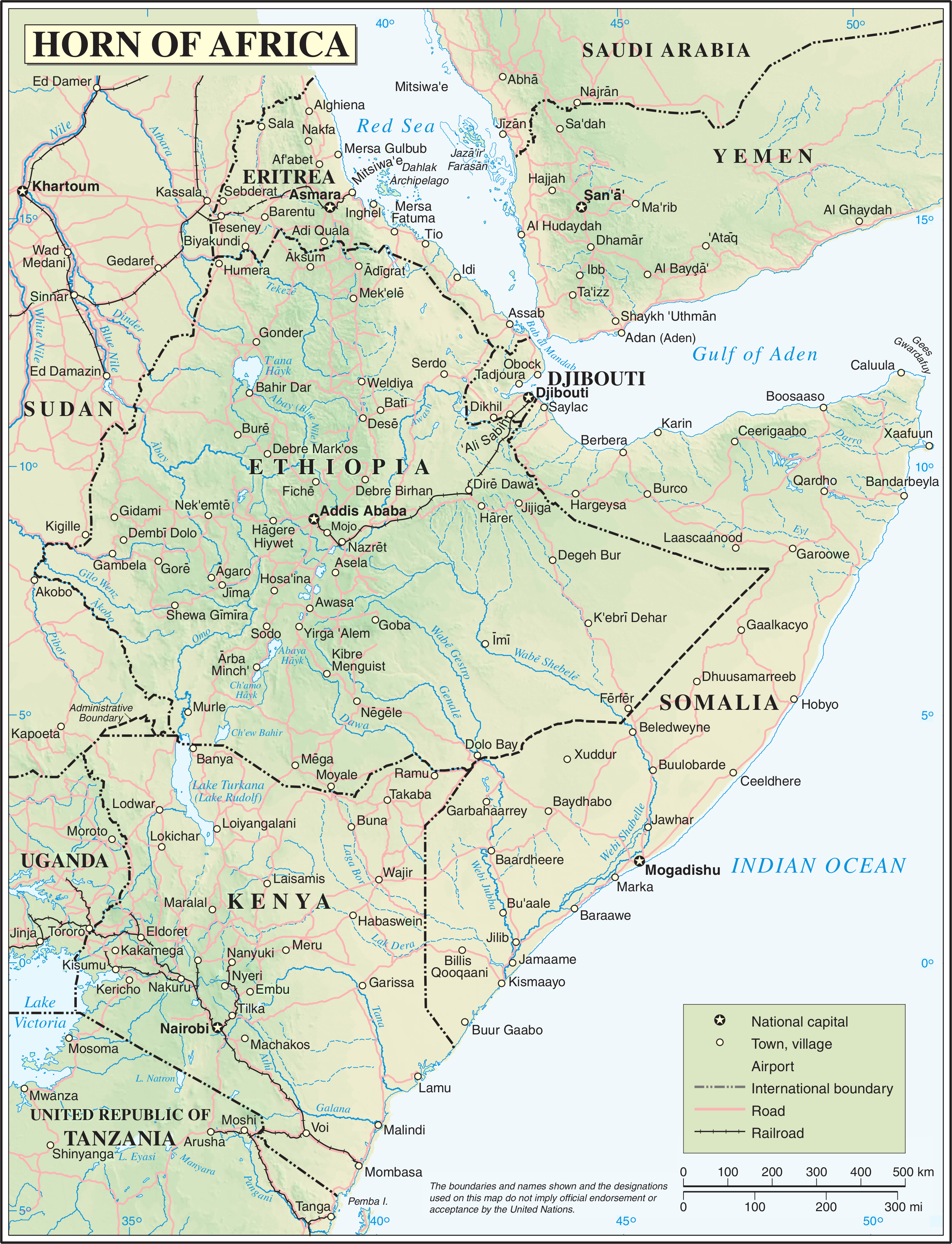
- Ethiopia and Eritrea in the Horn of Africa
- Date: 29 September 2006
- Meeting no.: 5,540
- Code: S/RES/1710 (Document)
- Subject: The situation between Eritrea and Ethiopia
- Voting summary: 15 voted for; None voted against; None abstained
- Result: Adopted

Security Council composition
- Permanent members: China; France; Russia; United Kingdom; United States
- Non-permanent members: Argentina; Rep. of the Congo; Denmark; Ghana; Greece; Japan; Peru; Qatar; Slovakia; Tanzania

United Nations Security Council Resolution 1710, adopted unanimously on September 29, 2006, after reaffirming all resolutions on the situation between Eritrea and Ethiopia, particularly resolutions 1320 (2000), 1430 (2003), 1466 (2003), 1640 (2005) and 1681 (2006), the Council extended the mandate of the United Nations Mission in Ethiopia and Eritrea (UNMEE) for four months until January 31, 2007.

The Secretary-General Kofi Annan had previously urged the Security Council to extend the mission.

== Resolution ==
=== Observations ===
The Security Council reaffirmed its support for the peace process between the two countries and the full implementation of the Algiers Agreement and decision of the Eritrea-Ethiopia Boundary Commission (EEBC) which was important for lasting peace in the region.

It reaffirmed the integrity of and respect for the Temporary Security Zone (TSZ), and commended UNMEE for operating under difficult circumstances.

=== Acts ===
The mandate of UNMEE was extended by four months. The Council demanded that Eritrea comply with Resolution 1640 by lifting restrictions on UNMEE's movement and operations while Ethiopia had to accept the ruling of the Ethiopia-Eritrea Boundary Commission decision on the mutual border. Furthermore, both Ethiopia and Eritrea had to exercise maximum restraint and refrain from threats and the use of force.

Meanwhile, the Council called on all parties to fully co-operate with the EEBC in the demarcation process and to provide UNMEE with the necessary assistance, support, protection and access required. If Ethiopia and Eritrea had not complied with the Council's demands by January 31, 2007, UNMEE would be transformed or reconfigured if necessary; in this regard, the situation would be reviewed by November 30, 2006 in order to prepare for possible changes.

The international community was requested to provide continued support for UNMEE and contributions towards the trust fund established in Resolution 1177 (1998).

== See also ==
- Badme
- Eritrean–Ethiopian War
- List of United Nations Security Council Resolutions 1701 to 1800 (2006–2008)
