= United Nations Security Council Resolution 1369 =

UN Security Council Resolution 1369
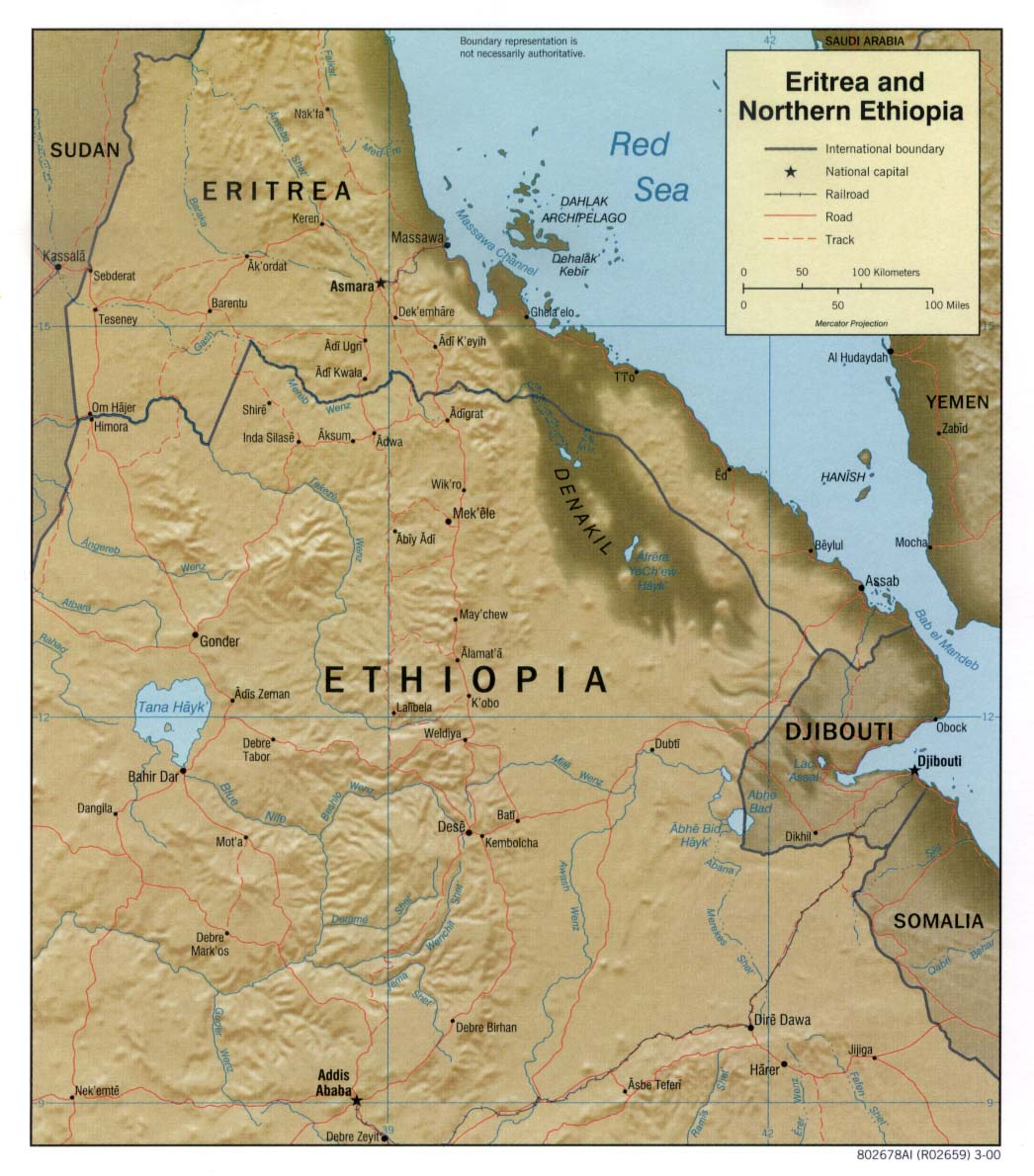
- Northern Ethiopia and Eritrea
- Date: 14 September 2001
- Meeting no.: 4,372
- Code: S/RES/1369 (Document)
- Subject: The situation between Eritrea and Ethiopia
- Voting summary: 15 voted for; None voted against; None abstained
- Result: Adopted

Security Council composition
- Permanent members: China; France; Russia; United Kingdom; United States
- Non-permanent members: Bangladesh; Colombia; Ireland; Jamaica; Mali; Mauritius; Norway; Singapore; Tunisia; Ukraine

United Nations Security Council resolution 1369, adopted unanimously on 14 September 2001, after reaffirming resolutions 1298 (1999), 1308 (2000), 1312 (2000), 1320 (2000) and 1344 (2001) on the situation between Eritrea and Ethiopia, the Council extended the mandate of the United Nations Mission in Ethiopia and Eritrea (UNMEE) until 15 March 2002.

== Resolution ==
=== Observations ===
The security council reaffirmed the need for both Eritrea and Ethiopia to respect international law, humanitarian law, human rights and refugee law and to ensure the safety and security of international humanitarian personnel. It reaffirmed its support for the Comprehensive Peace Agreement signed between the governments of both countries and welcomed the implementation of the agreements through the establishment of a Temporary Security Zone (TSZ) and constitution of the Boundary and Claims Commissions.

=== Acts ===
Extending UNMEE's mandate, the parties were called upon to co-operate fully with the UNMEE mission. The council stressed that UNMEE's termination was linked to the completion of the work of the Boundary Commission regarding the demarcation of the Ethiopia-Eritrea border, and emphasised that the TSZ had to be completely demilitarised. The parties were called upon to implement the following measures:

(a) allow freedom of movement for UNMEE so it could monitor the area 15 km north and south of the TSZ;
(b) facilitate the establishment of an air corridor between the capitals of Addis Ababa and Asmara;
(c) Eritrea had to provide information on police and militia inside the TSZ;
(d) Ethiopia had to provide information on minefields;
(e) Eritrea had to conclude a Status of Forces Agreement;
(f) release and return prisoners of war;
(g) fulfill financial responsibilities regarding the Boundary Commission.

The parties were also asked to consider confidence-building measures, including affording humane treatment to each other's nationals, exercising restraint in public statements and assisting in contacts between organisations of both countries. The international community was called upon to support the peace process through voluntary contributions, assistance in reconstruction and development, the reintegration of demobilised soldiers and discouraging arms flows to the region.

Finally, both Ethiopia and Eritrea were urged to ensure efforts were targeted on reconstruction and development of their respective economies rather than on weapons procurement. The council would continue to monitor the implementation of the Algiers Agreements and current Security Council resolution before the mandate of UNMEE would be renewed.

== See also ==
- Algiers Agreement (2000)
- Eritrean–Ethiopian War
- List of United Nations Security Council Resolutions 1301 to 1400 (2000–2002)
