= United Nations Security Council Resolution 1681 =

UN Security Council Resolution 1681
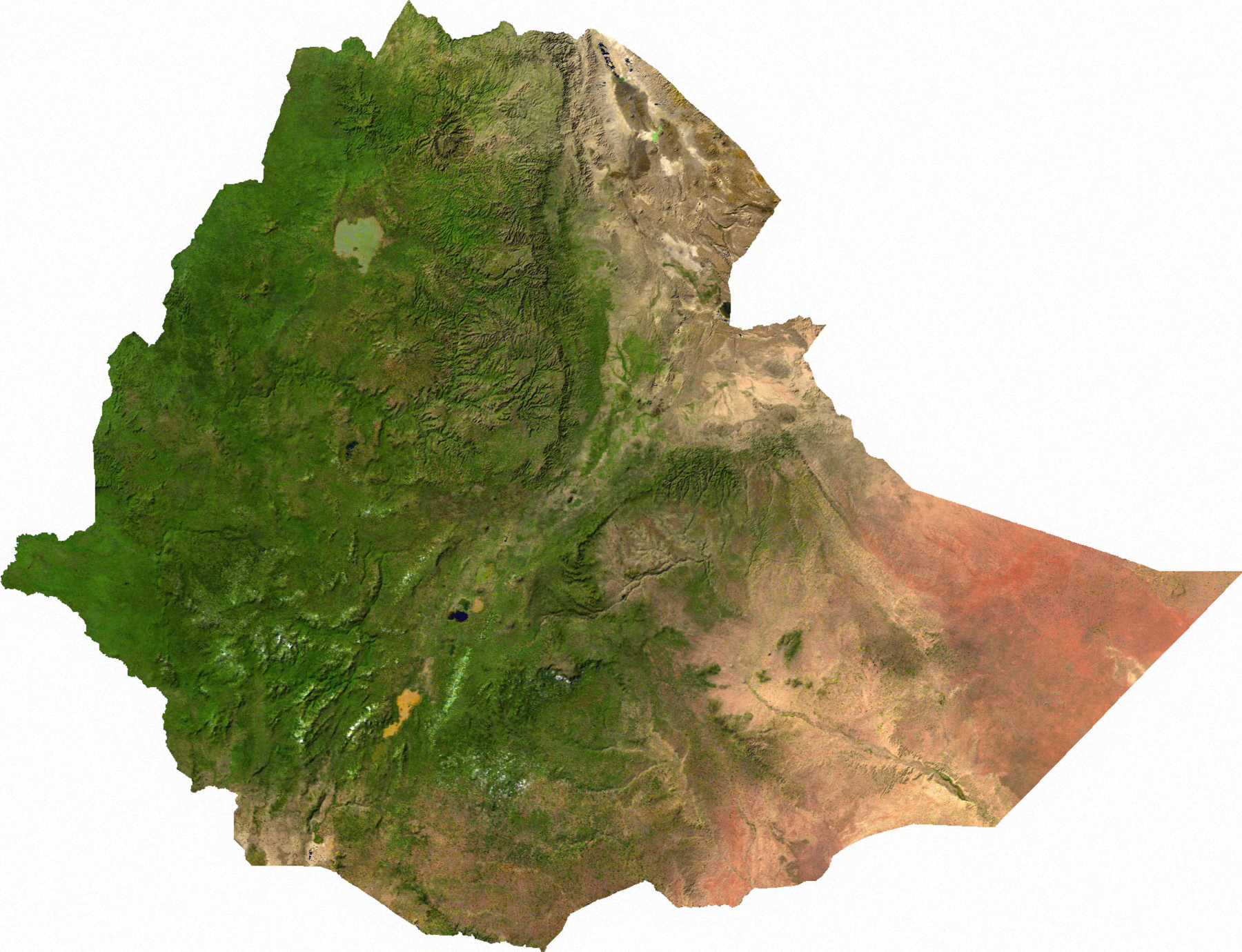
- Satellite image of Ethiopia
- Date: 31 May 2006
- Meeting no.: 5,450
- Code: S/RES/1681 (Document)
- Subject: The situation between Eritrea and Ethiopia
- Voting summary: 15 voted for; None voted against; None abstained
- Result: Adopted

Security Council composition
- Permanent members: China; France; Russia; United Kingdom; United States
- Non-permanent members: Argentina; Rep. of the Congo; Denmark; Ghana; Greece; Japan; Peru; Qatar; Slovakia; Tanzania

United Nations Security Council Resolution 1681, adopted unanimously on May 31, 2006, after reaffirming all resolutions on the situation between Eritrea and Ethiopia, particularly resolutions 1320 (2000), 1430 (2003), 1466 (2003), 1640 (2005) and 1678 (2006), the Council extended the mandate of the United Nations Mission in Ethiopia and Eritrea (UNMEE) until September 30, 2006, and cut its size by a third.

== Resolution ==
=== Observations ===
The Security Council reaffirmed its support for the peace process between the two countries and the full implementation of the Algiers Agreement and decision of the Eritrea-Ethiopia Boundary Commission (EEBC) which was important for lasting peace in the region.

It reaffirmed the integrity of and respect for the Temporary Security Zone (TSZ) and called for both Ethiopia and Eritrea to provide and assist UNMEE with necessary access, assistance, support and protection. Council members thanked countries that had contributed troops to UNMEE and welcomed the intention of the Secretary-General Kofi Annan to keep the operation under review.

=== Acts ===
The mandate of UNMEE was extended by four months, according to the resolution, which further approved the reconfiguration of UNMEE's military component to deploy 2,300 troops including 230 military observers; this was a reduction from 3,500. As with previous resolutions on the matter, it demanded compliance with Resolution 1640 and that Ethiopia and Eritrea provide necessary access, assistance, support and protection to the peacekeeping operation.

Meanwhile, the Council called on all parties to fully co-operate with the EEBC in the demarcation process. The international community was requested to provide continued support for UNMEE and contributions towards the trust fund established in Resolution 1177 (1998).

Finally, the Secretary-General was asked to provide updates on the situation.

== See also ==
- Badme
- Eritrean–Ethiopian War
- List of United Nations Security Council Resolutions 1601 to 1700 (2005–2006)
