= Eritrea–Ethiopia relations =

- Eritrea: Ethiopia

Relations between Eritrea and Ethiopia have been historically adversarial and are currently nonexistent. Eritrea gained independence from Ethiopia in 1993 after the Eritrean War of Independence, after which relations were cordial. Since independence Eritrea's relationship with Ethiopia was entirely political, especially in the resuscitation and expansion of IGAD's scope. However, the 1998 Eritrean–Ethiopian War marked a turning point, and their relationship became increasingly hostile.

Upon the selection of Abiy Ahmed as Ethiopian Prime Minister, a peace agreement was forged, and ties between the neighbouring countries were re-established on 9 July 2018. The alliance between the two countries was strengthened in 2020 with Eritrean troops reportedly assisting the Ethiopian Army in the Tigray war, but has since deteriorated as Eritrea has backed Somalia during the current escalations of the Ethiopian–Somali conflict.

On 1 October 2026, the Ethiopian Ministry of Foreign Affairs announced it was shutting its embassy in Asmara due to "hostility" and expelling 10 diplomats ordering them to leave the country within 48 hours. In response, Eritrea announced the severance of all diplomatic ties.

== History ==
=== Early relations ===
Aksumite Empire (c. 100-700 AD),

The territories of present-day Ethiopia and Eritrea are closely linked since ancient times. The ancient Kingdom of Aksum, which existed from the 1st century AD to the early Middle Ages, encompassed parts of both countries. In the highlands of present-day Eritrea, Medri Bahri existed from the 15th century onwards as a Christian vassal state. It enjoyed semi-autonomy from the Ethiopian Empire for a time. At the same time, the Eritrean coastal regions were subject to foreign powers for a long time from the 16th century onwards: the Ottoman Empire occupied the port city of Massawa and controlled the islands and coasts of the Red Sea with interruptions for over three centuries. In the 19th century, Egyptian troops also extended their influence to Eritrea, but were defeated by an Ethiopian army on the Mareb River in 1875. Towards the end of the 19th century, Eritrea became the focus of Italy's colonial ambitions. The Italian shipping company Rubattino acquired the coastal area around Assab in 1869, which became the property of the Italian state in 1882. In 1885, Italian troops occupied the port city of Massawa and began the gradual conquest of the Eritrean hinterland from there.

=== Colonial era ===
Italy's expansion in the Horn of Africa led to conflict with Abyssinia (now Ethiopia). Emperor Yohannes IV initially resisted, but his successor, Menelik II, recognized Italian rule over the territories north of the Mereb River in the Treaty of Wuchale in 1889. When Italian troops attempted to advance from Eritrea into Abyssinia, they were decisively defeated by Menelik's army on March 1, 1896, in the Battle of Adwa. In the Treaty of Addis Ababa in 1896, Italy recognized Abyssinia's independence. In October 1935, fascist Italy launched an invasion of independent Ethiopia from Eritrea and Italian Somaliland. Ethiopia was defeated in 1936 and incorporated into the newly created Italian East Africa. However, this union was short-lived: During the World War II, British troops conquered both Eritrea and Ethiopia in 1941, ending Italian rule over both countries. Eritrea then came under British military administration. After the end of the war, discussions arose about the future of Eritrea, with proposals ranging from integration into the Ethiopian state to complete independence.

=== Union (1952–1993) ===
Eritrea Province in Ethiopia

On December 2, 1950, the United Nations General Assembly voted to federate Eritrea with Ethiopia. On 15 September 1952, a federation was formed between the Ethiopian Empire and the autonomous component of Eritrea under the sovereignty of the Ethiopian crown. However, autonomy for Eritrea was gradually eroded from within. The Unionist Party of Eritrea, which dominated the Eritrean government, sought complete union with Ethiopia and worked to dismantle the federal arrangement. The first Chief Executive, Tedla Bairu, suppressed the independent press, suspended the assembly repeatedly to avoid scrutiny, and ignored the Eritrean constitution. His successor, Asfaha Woldemikael, simultaneously served as the Emperor's vice-representative while holding the office of Chief Executive, collapsing the distinction between the Eritrean and Ethiopian governments in practice. I

In November 1962, the Eritrean Assembly voted 43 to zero to dissolve the federation and incorporate Eritrea into Ethiopia as a province. Upon announcing the dissolution, Asfaha declared that "the reunion is a recognition of our being Ethiopians" and that "the word federation did not even exist in our language." After the Ethiopian revolution in 1974, Eritrea province was put under the reign of the Derg and later the People's Democratic Republic of Ethiopia.

==== Eritrean War of Independence (1961–1991) ====
Beginning as a conflict consisting of guriella warfare, the Eritrean War of Independence escalated into a protracted war between Eritrea forces and the central government. After Haile Selassie was overthrown in 1974, the Marxist Derg regime in Addis Ababa continued the war against Eritrean rebels with great severity. Various liberation movements, involved in the concurrent Eritrean Civil Wars, (from 1970 onwards, primarily the Eritrean People's Liberation Front (EPLF) under Isaias Afwerki) controlled large parts of the country at times. Finally, in 1991, the Eritrean independence fighters achieved complete military victory. The EPLF captured the capital Asmara in May 1991, making Eritrea de facto independent. Eritrea's independence was formally recognised when it was admitted into the UN after a referendum in 1993.

==== Secession of Eritrea ====
On May 24, 1993, Eritrea was officially established as a sovereign state and recognized internationally. Ethiopia's transitional government under Meles Zenawi accepted the referendum result and immediately established diplomatic relations with the new state.

== Modern relations ==
In the first years after the secession, bilateral relations were friendly. The ruling Tigray People's Liberation Front (TPLF) in Ethiopia and the military government in Eritrea had been former allies in the fight against the Derg dictatorship and signed agreements on economic cooperation. Ethiopia, which now no longer had its own access to the sea, continued to use the Eritrean ports of Assab and Massawa for its foreign trade. In the mid-1990s, however, simmering tensions came to the surface. Disagreements over trade, currency, and the exact border demarcation strained relations. In 1997, Eritrea introduced its own currency, leading to economic conflicts with Ethiopia. In May 1998, border incidents in the Badme region escalated into open military conflict between the two states.

=== Eritrean–Ethiopian War (1998–2000) ===
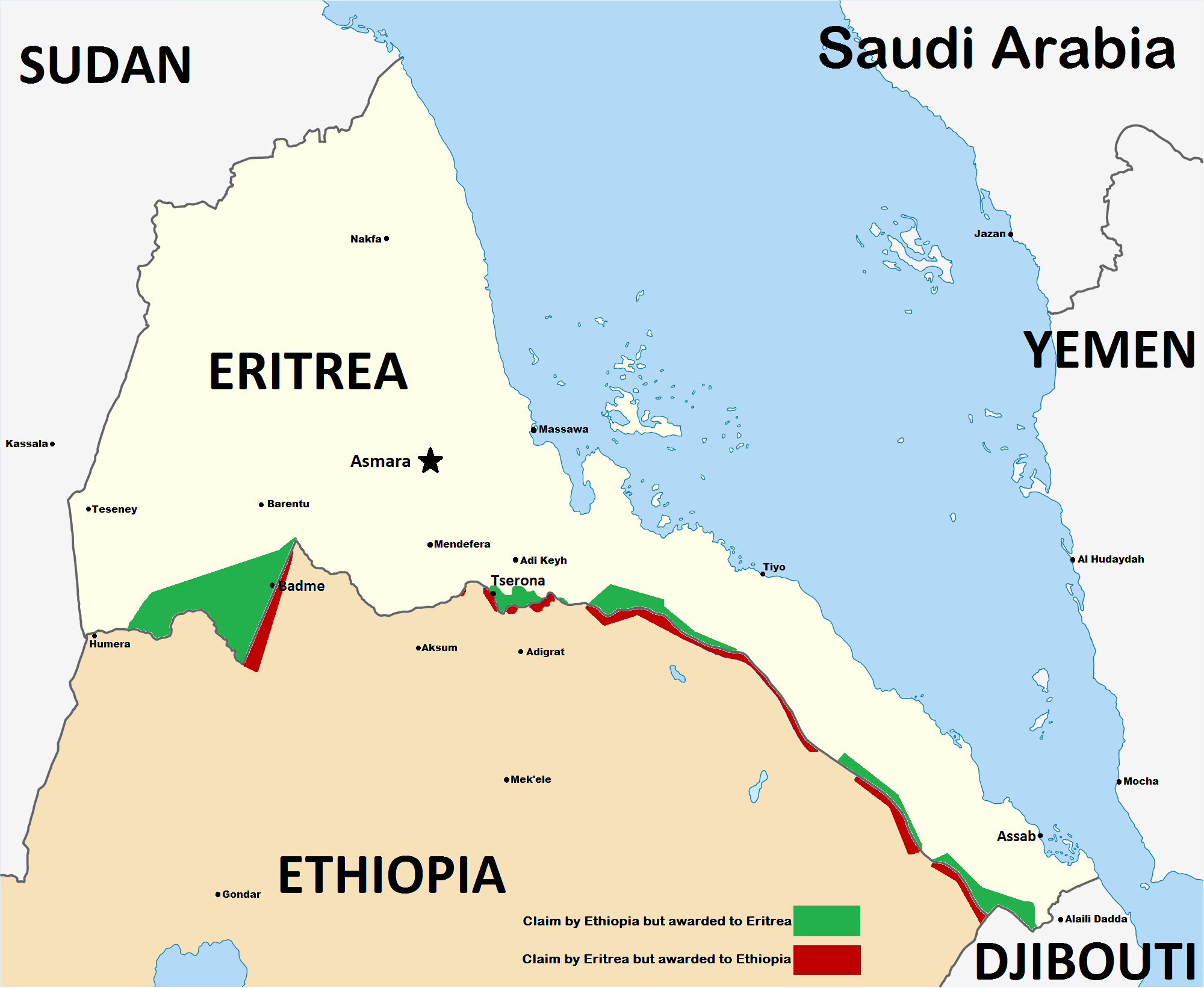
Eritrean–Ethiopian border conflict

The Eritrean-Ethiopian border war from 1998 to 2000 was one of the bloodiest conflicts in Africa since the end of the Cold War. Over the course of two years of intense fighting, an estimated 70,000 to 80,000 people were killed. The war began with fighting over the disputed border town of Badme and spread along the entire border, with fierce battles over largely worthless and arid land. In December 2000, the Algiers Agreement, brokered by the African Union, officially ended the fighting. Both sides committed themselves to recognizing an independent border arbitration commission. To monitor the ceasefire, the United Nations stationed a peacekeeping mission (UNMEE) in the buffer zone between Eritrea and Ethiopia. In April 2002, the Eritrea-Ethiopia Boundary Commission (EEBC) established a binding border, awarding Badme to Eritrea. However, Ethiopia refused to recognize the decision. As a result, the border remained unresolved and the peace agreement was only partially implemented.

=== Eritrean–Ethiopian border conflict (2000–2018) ===
From 2000 to 2018, both countries remained in a state of hostile relations without a formal peace agreement. All diplomatic ties were severed, border crossings closed, and telephone and postal connections interrupted. Disagreements following the war have resulted in stalemate punctuated by periods of elevated tension and renewed threats of war. Eritrea maintained a military force on its border with Ethiopia roughly equal in size to Ethiopia's force, which has required a general mobilization of a significant portion of the population. Eritrea has viewed this border dispute as an existential threat to itself in particular and the African Union in general, because it deals with the supremacy of colonial boundaries in Africa. Since the border conflict, Ethiopia no longer uses Eritrean ports for its trade.

During the border conflict and since, Ethiopia has fostered militants against Eritrea (including ethnic separatists and religiously based organizations). Eritrea has retaliated by hosting militant groups against Ethiopia as well. The United Nations Security Council argues that Eritrea and Ethiopia have expanded their dispute to a second theater, Somalia.

In March 2012, Ethiopian forces attacked Eritrean forces on the shared border. Federal Ethiopian authorities described the attacks as revenge for Eritrean support for groups opposed to the federal government.

==== 2018 peace agreement ====
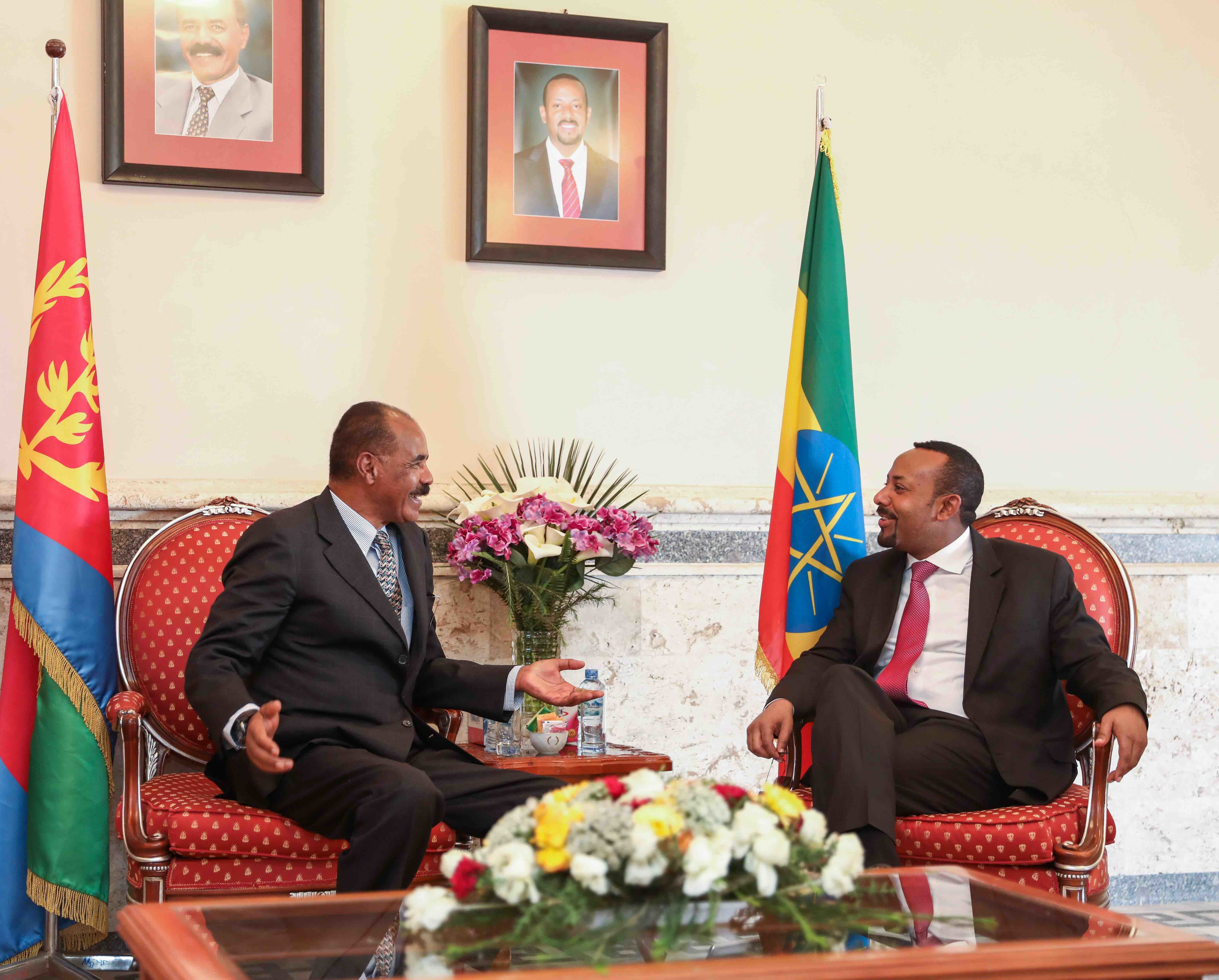
Abiy Ahmed and Isaias Afwerki speaking in Eritrea (2019)

At a summit on 8 July 2018 in Asmara, Eritrean President Isaias Afewerki and Ethiopian Prime Minister Abiy Ahmed pledged to restore diplomatic relations and open their borders to each other. The next day, they signed a joint declaration formally ending the Eritrean–Ethiopian border conflict. Another peace agreement was signed in Jeddah, Saudi Arabia on 16 September later that year. In September 2018, the increased close contacts of senior leadership in the Eritrea–Ethiopia relationship extended to the Tripartite Agreement that also included Somalia.

=== Rapprochement and the Tigray war (2018–2024) ===
Martin Plaut suggested that during a January 2020 trilateral meeting and bilateral Eritrea–Ethiopia visits in 2020, the leaders of the three countries discussed plans for the Tigray War prior to its official start with the 4 November 2020 Northern Command attacks.

A civil war in the Ethiopian region of Tigray saw the involvement of Eritrean troops in support of the Ethiopian central government. Eritrean forces entered Tigray and fought against the Tigray People's Liberation Front. Eritrean forces conducted an offensive in Tigray in the latter half of 2022, an event which contributed to the end of the conflict following the Ethiopia–Tigray peace agreement. Eritrea was not directly involved in the peace talks that led to the agreement, and was not referred to by name in the text. Eritrean forces remained present in several border regions of Tigray Region following the peace agreement, including Gulomakeda and Irob as of September 2024. The Eritrean occupation of parts of Tigray was mapped by The Sentry in June 2025.

=== Diplomatic crisis (2024–present) ===
Following the initial improvement in relations after the 2018 Eritrea–Ethiopia summit, tensions between Eritrea and Ethiopia increased from 2024 onward over regional security concerns, Ethiopia's pursuit of Red Sea access, and wider instability in the Horn of Africa. Ethiopian interest in access to Eritrean ports, including Assab, contributed to renewed diplomatic tensions between the two countries.

In February 2025, Eritrea banned Ethiopian Airlines flights to Asmara and carried out a military mobilization. In June 2025, a section of the border between Eritrea and Ethiopia was reopened at Zalambessa. This event marked the first gathering of Eritrean and Tigrayan frontier communities since the war, offering a symbolic moment of peace and reconciliation. Organised by local activists with tacit approval from Tigrayan and Eritrean officials, the reunion brought families and religious leaders together and even reignited cross-border trade using both currencies. Despite this move the official Eritrea–Ethiopia border remains closed and deep political tensions persist.

As of 7 May 2026, the United States was reported to be planning to lift sanctions against Eritrea, reflecting a strategic shift linked to the increasing geopolitical importance of the Red Sea amid regional tensions and the Iran–United States conflict. The move was intended to improve U.S.–Eritrea relations and was viewed as part of broader American efforts to strengthen engagement in the Red Sea region. The Wall Street Journal reported that the Trump administration was exploring a reset in ties with Eritrea due to its strategic location along the Red Sea as Iran threatened another major maritime corridor amid conflict with the United States.

The renewed diplomatic focus on Eritrea occurred amid wider regional instability involving Sudan, Somalia, and Ethiopia, as competition over Red Sea routes and regional influence increased. According to an article published by the International Crisis Group on 15 May 2026, U.S. officials believed that a major new conflict between Ethiopia and Eritrea could threaten Ethiopia's growing relationship with Washington.

In a May 2026 article for Foreign Affairs titled The War in Ethiopia Isn’t Over, Hilary Matfess argued that Ethiopia should pursue a diplomatic reset with Eritrea to reduce the risk of renewed conflict and proxy warfare. The article stated that tensions between Ethiopian Prime Minister Abiy Ahmed and the Eritrean government had escalated over security disputes, including Ethiopia's calls for Red Sea access through Eritrean ports. Matfess argued that Ethiopia should seek to reduce tensions with Eritrea and Egypt, and suggested that negotiations involving the United States could contribute to regional stabilization.

On 18 September 2026, the United States lifted sanctions against Eritrea's ruling People's Front for Democracy and Justice and the Eritrean Defense Force, as well as several individuals and entities previously sanctioned over their role in the Tigray conflict. The sanctions had originally been imposed by the Biden administration in 2021 over Eritrean involvement in the conflict in northern Ethiopia, with the U.S. Treasury identifying the Eritrean Defense Force and the People's Front for Democracy and Justice as actors contributing to the crisis. The reversal came amid a sharp deterioration in security around the Red Sea and Yemen, where Iran-backed Houthi forces had made territorial gains along the Red Sea coast and moved closer to the strategic Bab el-Mandeb Strait, the maritime chokepoint separating Yemen from the African coast of Eritrea and Djibouti. Eritrea's southern coastline and the port of Assab are located close to this strategic passage, giving the country renewed importance to U.S. calculations concerning Red Sea security, maritime traffic and the wider conflict involving Iran and its regional allies. The policy shift therefore represented a notable change in Washington's relationship with Asmara at a time when Ethiopia's relations with Eritrea were again deteriorating, particularly over Ethiopia's interest in securing sovereign access to Eritrean ports such as Assab. Its timing and the strategic importance of Eritrea's Red Sea position can be viewed as indicating that Washington was placing greater emphasis on engagement with Asmara as regional maritime security became increasingly important during the Iran conflict and the escalation in Yemen.

In October 2026, relations between Ethiopia and Eritrea deteriorated sharply. Ethiopia expelled ten Eritrean diplomats and closed its embassy in Eritrea, accusing the diplomats of activities threatening Ethiopian national security. Eritrea responded by severing diplomatic relations. The diplomatic crisis coincided with renewed fighting in Ethiopia's Tigray region.

== Societal and cultural relations ==
Despite political tensions, Ethiopia and Eritrea have close cultural and historical ties. Both nations share the heritage of the ancient Aksum Empire, which introduced Christianity as the state religion in the 4th century. The Ethiopian Orthodox and Eritrean Orthodox Tewahedo churches trace their roots back to this common heritage. There are also close linguistic and ethnic ties: the Tigrinya ethnic group, which dominates Eritrea, is closely related to the Tigray in Ethiopia, and the Tigrinya language is spoken on both sides of the border. Overall, the social structures of both countries show many similarities (for example in music, dance, and cuisine). The cultural and family ties between the two nations have been severely damaged at times by war and separation. Hundreds of thousands of people with Eritrean roots lived in Ethiopia before 1998 and were expelled during the border war; conversely, many Ethiopians fled to Eritrea to escape the fighting. It was only with the conclusion of peace in 2018 that torn families and communities were able to reunite.

=== Ethiopian-Eritreans Community Organizations and the Habesha Community ===
Throughout the Ethiopian-Eritrean Diaspora, there have been many multi-ethnic and bi-national origin community organizations founded by and for Eritreans and Ethiopians to foster good relationships, promote and express cultural commonalities well before diplomatic ties between the two countries's governments were ever restored. A majority of these organizations are found on college/university campuses throughout the United States, Canada, and other parts of the Ethiopian-Eritrean Diaspora.

== Resident diplomatic missions ==
- Eritrea has an embassy in Addis Ababa.
- Ethiopia has an embassy in Asmara.

== Country comparison ==
	Eritrea	Ethiopia
Coat of Arms		
Flag	Eritrea	Ethiopia
Population	6081196 (2020 estimate)	138,902,185 (2025 estimate)
Area	117600 km^{2} (45400 sq mi)	1104300 km^{2} (426400 sq mi)
Population Density	51.7/km^{2} (20/sq mi)	106.7/km^{2} (41.2/sq mi)
Capital	Asmara (pop. 1,073,000)	Addis Ababa (pop. 6,287,000)
Government	Unitary one-party presidential republic	Ethnofederalist (federal) parliamentary constitutional republic
Official language	Tigrinya (de facto), Tigre, Saho, Afar, Bilen, Beja, Kunama, Nara, Arabic	Amharic (de facto), Oromo, Tigrinya, Somali, Afar
Main religions	50-63% Christianity, 36-48% Islam, 1-2% other religions (2011)	43.8% Ethiopian Orthodox, 31.3% Islam, 22.8% P'ent'ay, 0.7% Catholic, 0.6% traditional faiths, 0.8% other religions (2010)
Ethnic groups	50% Tigrinya, 30% Tigre, 4% Saho, 4% Afar, 4% Kunama, 3% Bilen, 5% other (Nara, Beja, Rashaida) (2021 estimate)	34.5% Oromo, 26.9% Amhara, 6.2% Somali, 6.1% Tigrinya (Tigrayan), 4.0% Sidama, 2.5% Gurage, 17.5% other (2007 census)
