= United Nations Security Council Resolution 1434 =

UN Security Council Resolution 1434
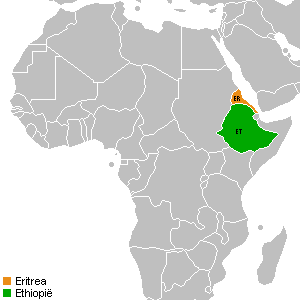
- Eritrea (orange) and Ethiopia (green)
- Date: 6 September 2002
- Meeting no.: 4,606
- Code: S/RES/1434 (Document)
- Subject: The situation between Eritrea and Ethiopia
- Voting summary: 15 voted for; None voted against; None abstained
- Result: Adopted

Security Council composition
- Permanent members: China; France; Russia; United Kingdom; United States
- Non-permanent members: Bulgaria; Cameroon; Colombia; Guinea; Ireland; Mauritius; Mexico; Norway; Singapore; Syria

United Nations Security Council resolution 1434, adopted unanimously on 6 September 2002, after reaffirming all resolutions on the situation between Eritrea and Ethiopia, particularly Resolution 1430 (2002), the council extended the mandate of the United Nations Mission in Ethiopia and Eritrea (UNMEE) until 15 March 2003.

The security council reaffirmed its support for the peace process between the two countries and of the role played by UNMEE in facilitating the implementation of the Algiers Agreement and decision by the Boundary Commission on the mutual border. It welcomed the declarations by both Ethiopia and Eritrea to fully implement their commitments, including the release of prisoners of war, but expressed concern cross-border harassment and abduction of civilians.

The resolution extended UNMEE's mandate at the current troop level of 4,200 in accordance with Resolution 1320 (2000). Progress made by the parties in the implementation of their agreements would be monitored and the implications of territorial transfers during the boundary demarcation for UNMEE would be reviewed by the council.

== See also ==
- Badme
- Eritrean–Ethiopian War
- List of United Nations Security Council Resolutions 1401 to 1500 (2002–2003)
