= United Nations Security Council Resolution 1344 =

UN Security Council Resolution 1344
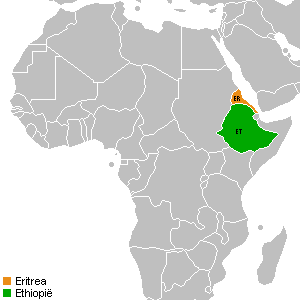
- Location of Eritrea (orange) and Ethiopia (green) in Africa
- Date: 15 March 2001
- Meeting no.: 4,294
- Code: S/RES/1344 (Document)
- Subject: The situation between Eritrea and Ethiopia
- Voting summary: 15 voted for; None voted against; None abstained
- Result: Adopted

Security Council composition
- Permanent members: China; France; Russia; United Kingdom; United States
- Non-permanent members: Bangladesh; Colombia; Ireland; Jamaica; Mali; Mauritius; Norway; Singapore; Tunisia; Ukraine

United Nations Security Council resolution 1344, adopted unanimously on 15 March 2001, after reaffirming resolutions 1298 (1999), 1308 (2000), 1312 (2000) and 1320 (2000) on the situation between Eritrea and Ethiopia, and 1308 (2000), the Council extended the mandate of the United Nations Mission in Ethiopia and Eritrea (UNMEE) until 15 September 2001.

The Security Council stressed the need for both Ethiopia and Eritrea to fulfill their obligations under international humanitarian, human rights and refugee law, and reaffirmed its support of the 2000 Agreement of Cessation of Hostilities signed by both countries.

The mandate of UNMEE, at its present troop and observer levels, was extended for one year. The parties were urged to complete the implementation of their agreements, including the following actions:

(a) ensure freedom of movement for UNMEE;
(b) establish an air corridor between the capitals of Addis Ababa and Asmara;
(c) conclude a Status of Forces Agreement with the Secretary-General Kofi Annan;
(d) facilitate demining efforts.

The Council stressed that the termination of the peacekeeping mission was linked to the demarcation of the Ethiopian-Eritrean border and both parties had to fund the Boundary Commission in this respect. Finally, all countries and international organisations were urged to provide contributions to the voluntary trust fund to facilitate the demarcation of the border and finance reconstruction efforts.

== See also ==
- Algiers Agreement (2000)
- Eritrean–Ethiopian War
- List of United Nations Security Council Resolutions 1301 to 1400 (2000–2002)
