= February 1999 Eritrean–Ethiopian aerial clashes =

- Part of Eritrean–Ethiopian War
Date	February 1999
Location	Eritrea-Ethiopian border
Result	Ethiopian victory

Belligerents
Ethiopia	Eritrea

Commanders and leaders
Abebe Tekle Haimanota (Chief of the Air Force and Air Defense); Yakim Yanakov (Adviser to the Chief of the Air Force and Air Defense)	unknown

Units involved
Ethiopian Air Force: Russian military specialists (disputed level of involvement)	Eritrean Air Force: Ukrainian military specialists (disputed level of involvement)

Strength
8 Su-27s	10 MiG-29s; 4 pilots (2 Eritrean, 2 foreign)

Casualties and losses
None	2 pilots were killed, 2 planes were shot down, 1 plane was shot down or damaged

In February 1999, three clashes occurred between the aviation of Ethiopia and Eritrea. The events were part of the Badme War. During the clashes, Ethiopian Su-27s fought against Eritrean MiG-29s. There is a possibility that pilots from the former USSR participated in the battles, though this has been strongly disputed by local sources. In all skirmishes, the Ethiopians won, gaining complete air supremacy for the rest of the war.

== Background ==
In 1998, Eritrea invaded Ethiopia, starting an open war. Both sides fielded substantial air forces, yet were also in dire need of additional trained pilots. To bolster their forces, both sides thus enlisted foreigners, mostly from the former Eastern bloc to train combat pilots in Eritrea and Ethiopia respectively. The Ethiopian Air Force (ETAF) mostly enlisted Bulgarian and Russian experts. The Russians informed the Ethiopians that the Eritrean Air Force (ERAF) was buying a small number of new MiG-29s for the upcoming air campaign, and recommended that the Ethiopians in turn acquire Su-27s in response. The ETAF consequently began receiving six Su-27SKs and two Su-27UBs from December 1998, accompanied by 300 Russian experts. On the other side, the Eritreans had bought eight MiG-29A and two MiG-29UB, and employed Ukrainian experts to train their MiG-29 pilots.

In February 1999, the Ethiopian high command launched Operation Sunset, using a strong force of 13 divisions to break through the Eritrean frontline and retaking much of the territory lost to the Eritrean invasion. The ETAF supported the offensive, first by launching misleading air strikes to distract the Eritreans from Operation Sunset's preparations, and then with extensive bombing attacks as the Ethiopian ground forces pushed forward.

== Combat ==
=== 21 February ===
The first encounter between an Ethiopian Su-27 and Eritrean MiG-29s reportedly took place on 21 February, when two of the latter attempted to ambush the Su-27. However, the Su-27 escaped and damaged one of the attackers.

=== 25 February ===
With the Eritrean defenses in crisis, Eritrean President Isaias Afwerki fired his chief of staff and ordered the ERAF into the air to intercept the Ethiopian air raids at all costs. On 25 February, an Eritrean MiG-29 piloted by Yonas Misghinna scrambled from Asmara to intercept an ETAF Su-27SK piloted by Lt-Col. Gebre-Salassie north of Mekelle. In the following air battle, the MiG-29 was shot down and Misghinna killed. This clash already showcased that the Eritrean planes were inferior to the Ethiopians. Usually, the ERAF would organize an investigation into such air battles and take steps to avoid further losses; however, as the Eritrean government had ordered its air force to defend the air space regardless of the circumstances, its MiG-29 were simply ordered into the air again. One surviving Eritrean pilot later commented that this caused great consternation in the ERAF, as its members felt that their lives were thrown away for little gain. It is noteworthy that MiG and Sukhoi aircraft had not met in battles as opponents before this point. This was the first such case.

Later, it was claimed that the Su-27 involved in the clash of 25 February had actually been piloted by a foreign expert. According to this version of the events, four Eritrean MiG-29 had attempted to intercept two ETAF Su-27s piloted by Russians in a surprise attack. After surviving the initial salvo by the ERAF planes, the SU-27s had counter-attacked and destroyed one Eritrean MiG-29. However, Ethiopian sources, including veteran pilots of the war, strongly disputed that the Russian experts had flown combat missions on their behalf in 1999.

=== 26 February ===
On 26 February, another Eritrean MiG-29 piloted by Samuel Girmay was ordered to fly south from Asmara, again to intercept a Su-27SK piloted by Lt-Col. Gebre-Salassie. A number of different accounts exist of the resulting air battle, though all agree that the Ethiopian was victorious and Girmay killed.

Furthermore, there was allegedly another encounter between an Ethiopian Su-27S and an Eritrean MiG-29 on 26 February. The Su-27S pilot, Capt. Tolossa, (Note: Tolossa was a female pilot in the ETAF. The spelling of her first name varies, with "Aster", "Asther", and "Esteher" being used.) was escorting several MiG-21s as she spotted an unarmed Eritrean MiG-29UB. Tolossa signalled to the Eritrean pilot, and realized that he was her former instructor; she warned him to land at Debre Zeit, but he refused, whereupon she opened fire. Tolossa claimed that she had shot down the MiG-29UB. However, the allegedly destroyed MiG-29UB, "ERAF 502", did in fact survive the war undamaged. Another Eritrean MiG-29UB, "ERAF 501", was damaged.

== Aftermath ==
The air battles left the Eritreans with just two operational, combat-capable MiG-29 and two pilots qualified to fly them, severely limiting their aerial capabilities. One of the surviving pilots, Dejen Ande Hishel, complained about the situation and was subsequently imprisoned by the government, leaving the ERAF with just one MiG-29 pilot. Thus, the Ethiopian aviation gained complete air supremacy. After February 1999, Eritrea avoided direct combat with enemy aircraft and did not commit air attacks.
