= United Nations Security Council Resolution 1466 =

UN Security Council Resolution 1466
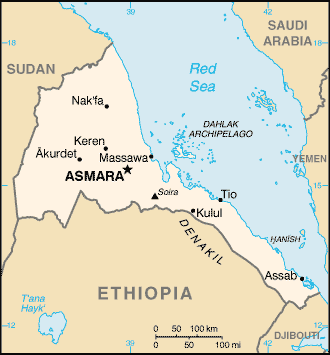
- Eritrea and northern Ethiopia
- Date: 14 March 2003
- Meeting no.: 4,719
- Code: S/RES/1466 (Document)
- Subject: The situation between Eritrea and Ethiopia
- Voting summary: 15 voted for; None voted against; None abstained
- Result: Adopted

Security Council composition
- Permanent members: China; France; Russia; United Kingdom; United States
- Non-permanent members: Angola; Bulgaria; Chile; Cameroon; Germany; Guinea; Mexico; Pakistan; Spain; Syria

United Nations Security Council resolution 1466 is a United Nation Security Council resolution that was adopted unanimously on 14 March 2003. After reaffirming all resolutions on the situation between Eritrea and Ethiopia, particularly Resolution 1434 (2002), the council extended the mandate of the United Nations Mission in Ethiopia and Eritrea (UNMEE) until 15 September 2003.

== Resolution ==
=== Observations ===
The Security Council reaffirmed its support for the peace process between the two countries and of the role played by UNMEE in facilitating the implementation of the Algiers Agreement and decision by the Boundary Commission on the mutual border. It welcomed progress made by both Ethiopia and Eritrea in the peace process and urged both countries to fulfil their obligations under international law, including international humanitarian, refugee and human rights law. The peace process was entering a crucial stage and the Council expressed concern at violations of the model Status of Forces Agreement signed by Ethiopia and agreed by Eritrea; it stressed that peace would be achieved through the implementation of the Algiers Agreement and decisions of the Boundary Commission.

=== Acts ===
The resolution extended UNMEE's mandate at the prevailing troop level of 4,200 in accordance with Resolution 1320 (2000). Both parties were urged to fulfil their commitments under the Algiers Agreement and fully implement Boundary Commission decisions, as concern was expressed at incursions into the southern boundary of the Temporary Security Zone. The parties were further called upon to co-operate with UNMEE, protect United Nations personnel and their freedom of movement, and establish an air corridor between the capitals of Addis Ababa and Asmara to reduce the costs of the mission.

The Council affirmed the capability of UNMEE to monitor compliance by Ethiopia and Eritrea with their responsibilities, and noted its education and demining efforts. The two parties were urged to continue discussions on territorial transfers, inform their populations about the demarcation process and its consequences, and refrain from unilateral troop and population movements or establishment of settlements near the Ethiopia-Eritrea border. The council would review progress in the implementation of the aforementioned commitments and responsibilities and determine any implications for UNMEE.

The resolution expressed concern at the continuing drought and humanitarian situation in both countries and called upon both countries to adopt confidence-building measures and measures to normalise their diplomatic relations.

== See also ==
- Badme
- Eritrean–Ethiopian War
- List of United Nations Security Council Resolutions 1401 to 1500 (2002–2003)
