= Zalambessa (district) =

Small area on the border between Eritrea and Ethiopia

- Subregion or part
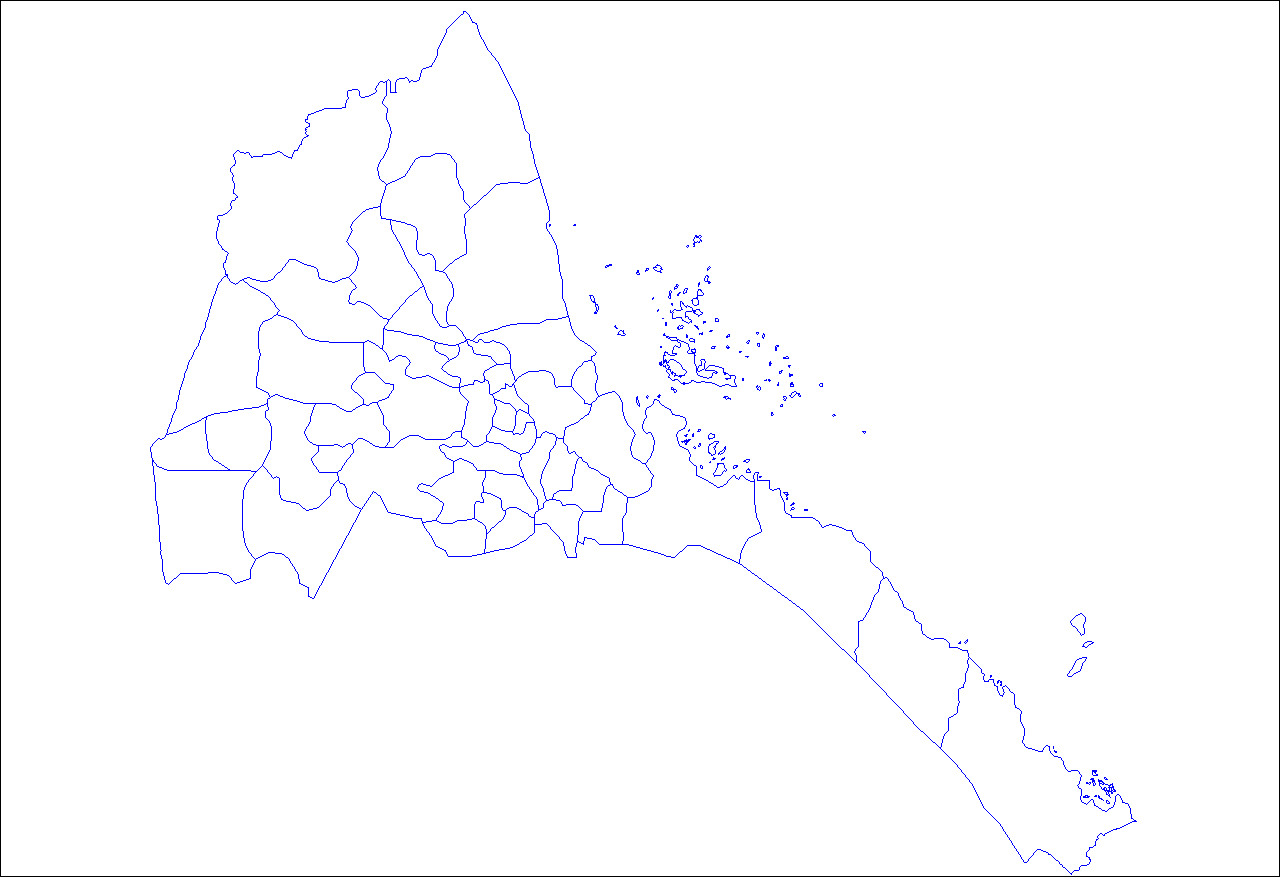
- Country: Eritrea or Ethiopia

Zalambessa is a small area on the border between Eritrea and Ethiopia claimed by the two countries that clashed especially on this issue in a war between 1998 and 2000 . Eritrea believes that it belongs to its Debub Zone, while Ethiopia believes that it belongs to the Misraqawi Zone of Tigray.

Other controversial areas along the border between Eritrea and Ethiopia are Bure and Badme .

Based on figures from the Central Statistical Agency of Ethiopia released in 2005, Zalambessa has an estimated total population of 10,551, of whom 5,176 were males and 5,375 were females. The 1994 census reported it had a total population of 6,059 of whom 2,756 were males and 3,303 were females. It is not clear whether these census figures cover the entire area.

Zalambessa was a village that was fortified by Italian colonial forces. The fortifications were taken over by the Ethiopian military in 1952 when Eritrea was federated with Ethiopia. The older village remained under Eritrean Administration and the exact border became an issue in the modern border dispute.

During the 2020-2021 Tigray War, attacks were carried out on Zalambessa by the joint Ethiopian and Eritrean armies. On 18 December 2020, an EEPA report stated that four named priests and three civilians were killed by troops (reportedly ENDF and Eritrean allied troops) in Zalambessa town. On 19 December 2020, a foreign diplomat mentioned that "thousands" of Eritrean soldiers are engaged in Tigray. Two diplomats stated that Eritrean troops entered Ethiopia through three northern border towns: Zalambessa, Rama and Badme.

== See also ==
- Subregions of Eritrea
- List of districts in the Tigray Region
