= 2018 Eritrea–Ethiopia summit =

Bilateral summit

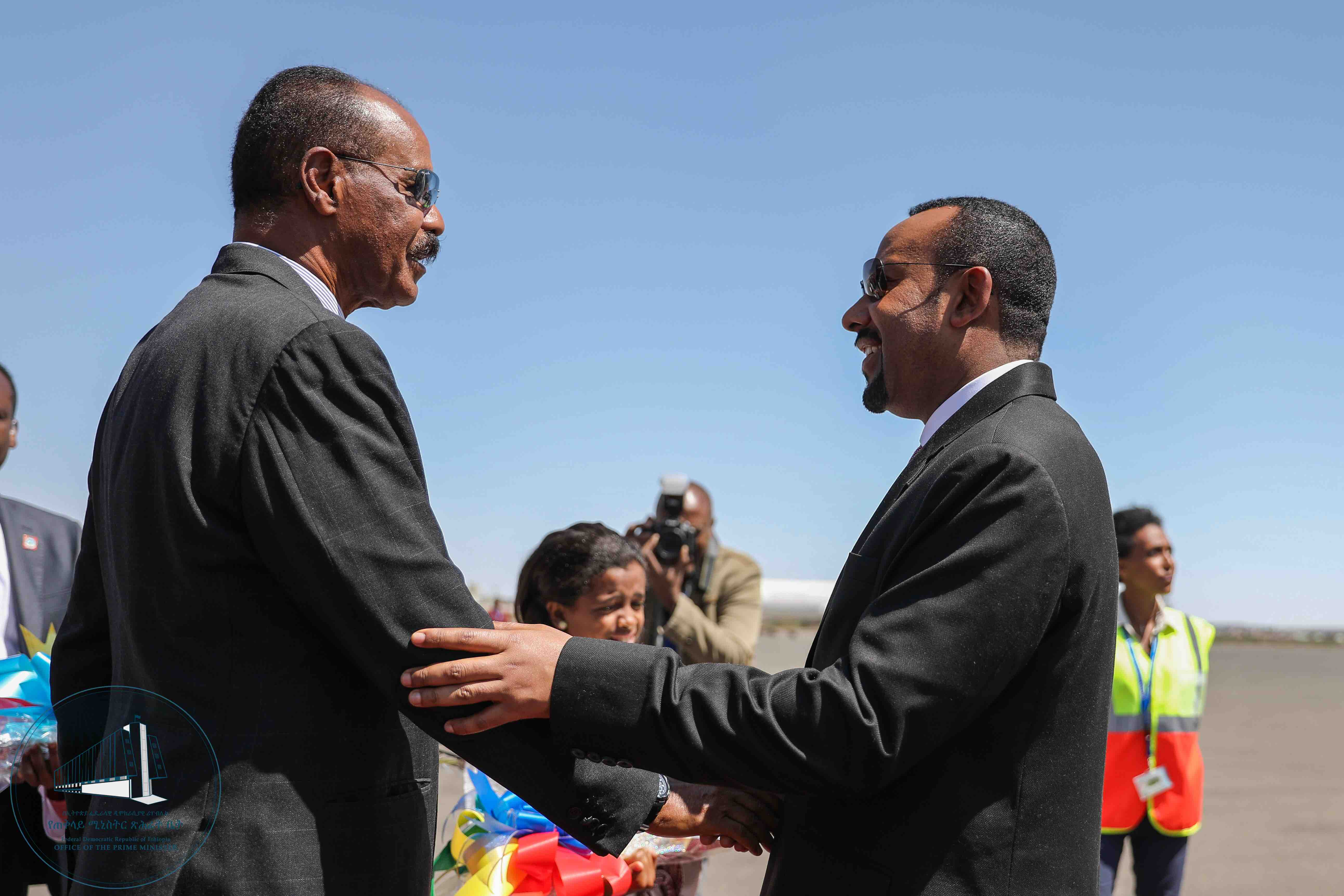
- Abiy and Isaias in 2019.
- Host country: Eritrea
- Date: 8–9 July 2018
- Venues: President's Office, Asmara
- Participants: (Eritrea) Isaias Afwerki (Ethiopia) Abiy Ahmed

Key points
- 1. The state of war between Ethiopia and Eritrea has come to an end 2. To forge intimate political, economic, social, cultural and security cooperation 3. Diplomatic ties, transport, trade & communication links resume 4. The decision on the boundary will be implemented 5. Jointly ensuring regional peace, cooperation and development

The 2018 Eritrea–Ethiopia summit (also 2018 Eritrea–Ethiopia peace summit) was a bilateral summit that took place on 8–9 July 2018 in Asmara, Eritrea, between Eritrean President Isaias Afwerki and Ethiopian Prime Minister Abiy Ahmed and officials from the two countries.

The two leaders signed a joint declaration on 9 July, formally ending the border conflict between both countries, restoring full diplomatic relations, and agreeing to open their borders to each other for persons, goods and services. The joint statement was also considered to close all chapters regarding the Eritrean–Ethiopian War (1998–2000) and of the following Eritrean–Ethiopian border conflict (2000–2018) with sporadic clashes.

== Background ==
Eritrea gained independence from Ethiopia in 1993 following the 30-year Eritrean War of Independence, and subsequent border disputes caused continuing tension between the two nations. The tensions came to a crisis point in May 1998, and Eritrea invaded Ethiopia, leading to the Eritrean–Ethiopian War; this killed between 70,000–100,000 on both sides and left Eritrea with over a third of its territory occupied and more than 650,000 people displaced.

In 2000, the two countries signed the Algiers Agreement agreeing to submit to binding arbitration to resolve boundary and restitution questions. Eritrea was awarded most of the disputed territory by the Permanent Court of Arbitration, but Ethiopia still occupied most of the disputed land as of 2017. The result was a frozen conflict state of "no war, no peace" and prolonged tensions between the two countries. Each country accused the other of hosting terrorist movements aimed at fomenting regime change, and both remained closed societies; Ethiopia was an authoritarian dominant-party state ruled by the Ethiopian People's Revolutionary Democratic Front (EPRDF), and Eritrea is a totalitarian one-party state ruled by the People's Front for Democracy and Justice (PFDJ). Presidential and parliamentary elections in Eritrea have been indefinitely postponed and have never been held since independence.

Hailemariam Desalegn, Prime Minister of Ethiopia from 2012 to 2018, was unable to make progress toward resolving tensions with Eritrea, and his tenure saw repeated waves of protest against the repressive political atmosphere. After he resigned in 2018, he was replaced by Abiy Ahmed, who promised in his inaugural address to negotiate an end to the Ethio-Eritrean conflict.

== Announcement and preparations ==
On 5 June 2018, the Executive Committee of the ruling Ethiopian People's Revolutionary Democratic Front announced its intention to accept and fully implement the 2002 ruling of the Eritrea-Ethiopia Boundary Commission (EEBC) established under the auspices of the Permanent Court of Arbitration pursuant to the 2000 Algiers Agreement. In a statement, the EPRDF called for Eritrea to reciprocate and implement the peace deal without preconditions.

The decision came as a surprise, representing a reversal of sixteen years of Ethiopian policy. While cause for optimism across much of Ethiopia, in the Tigray Region, under whose jurisdiction most of the disputed territories fall, the announcement sparked protest, including in the disputed town of Badme itself and amongst war veterans. On 13 June 2018 the executive committee of the Tigrayan People's Liberation Front denounced, among other things, the decision to hand over Badme as "fundamentally flawed", saying that the ruling coalition suffered from a "fundamental leadership deficit". Ethnic Irobs living in the border areas currently under Ethiopian administration organised a protest to condemn the decision to accept the boundary commission's ruling, fearing the division of their community. In a question-and-answer session in Parliament on 11 June, Abiy defended his peace initiative, saying: "I was standing in [Badme] when we put up our flag, and I cried. Many of my friends who fought in that war, we had to bury", alluding to his own service during the conflict.

The Eritrean government, seeming to have been caught by surprise by the move, refrained from commenting on the Ethiopian offer for two weeks until 20 June, in President Isaias's speech on the occasion of Martyrs' Day. Bemoaning "two lost generations" of opportunity, the Eritrean president announced that his government would send a delegation to Addis Ababa "to gauge current developments directly and in depth as well as to chart out a plan for continuous future action". Less than a week later, on 26 June 2018, Eritrean Foreign Minister Osman Saleh visited Addis Ababa for three days, taking part in the first bilateral meeting between the two countries in over two decades. The two countries agreed to re-establish diplomatic relations and exchange ambassadors, and Abiy agreed to meet with his Eritrean counterpart "in the near future", although Ethiopian foreign minister Workneh Gebeyehu added that a time and location had not been determined.

== Summit meeting ==
=== 8 July ===
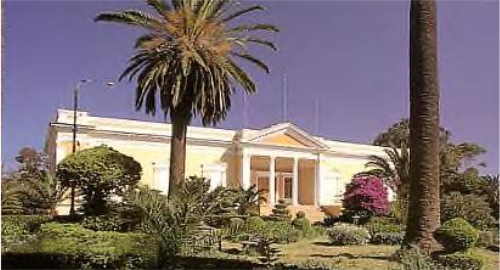
Eritrean presidential office in Asmara

Abiy arrived in Asmara, Eritrea on 8 July, where he was greeted by President Isaias at Asmara International Airport. Hundreds of thousands of people lined Asmara's main thoroughfare, Harnet Avenue, to welcome the Ethiopian leader's motorcade. The two leaders and their delegations held an expanded bilateral meeting at the Presidential Palace, announcing that telephone lines between the two countries would be re-connected with immediate effect. Also announced were the re-establishment of embassies, the opening of ports, air routes, and "free travel" between the two countries, although what the latter would entail was unclear.

That evening, the Eritrean leader held an official dinner for his Ethiopian guest at the Asmara Municipality Building, attended by government and party officials and the diplomatic corps, in which the two toasted the end of tensions and heralded a new era of Eritrea–Ethiopia relations.

We have agreed to bring down the wall between us. Now there is no border between Ethiopia and Eritrea. That border line has gone today with the display of a true love ... love is greater than modern weapons like tanks and missiles. Love can win hearts, and we have seen a great deal of it today here in Asmara. From this time on, war is not an option for the people of Eritrea and Ethiopia. What we need now is love.

— Abiy Ahmed

The Eritrean people have today had the chance to express their true love and emotion for Ethiopians. We can imagine that the decisions the prime minister of Ethiopia took were not easy ones. But we can assure you we will face the future together. We will work as one.

— Isaias Afewerki

=== 9 July ===
Joint Declaration of Peace and Friendship
Joint Declaration of Peace and Friendship between Eritrea and Ethiopia
- Type: Peace treaty
- Context: Eritrean–Ethiopian border conflict and Eritrea–Ethiopia relations
- Signed: July 9, 2018
- Location: President's Office, Asmara, Eritrea
- Signatories: Eritrea; Ethiopia
- Depositary: United Nations

Full text
- Joint Declaration of Peace and Friendship between Eritrea and Ethiopia at Wikisource

Following a coffee ceremony at Isaias's private residence, the two leaders signed a five-point "Joint Declaration of Peace and Friendship" declaring that "the state of war between Ethiopia and Eritrea has come to an end; a new era of peace and friendship has been opened." In the joint declaration, the two countries agreed to resume diplomatic relations and transport, trade and communications links, implement the EEBC's border ruling, and ensure regional peace and cooperation.

Abiy then departed Asmara—again with President Isaias bidding him farewell at the airport—and returned to Addis Ababa.

=== Delegations ===
Abiy was accompanied by Workneh Gebeyehu, Minister of Foreign Affairs, Muferiat Kamil, the Speaker of the House of Peoples' Representatives, Keria Ibrahim, the Speaker of the House of Federation, and Seyoum Awol, President of the Afar Region. Notably absent was Debretsion Gebremichael, President of the Tigray Region and leader of the TPLF, which has been critical of the peace process.

== Reactions ==
Leaders and organizations across Africa and the world welcomed the summit's success, expressing their support for the peace process between the two countries.

Countries and territories

- China: Foreign Ministry Spokeswoman Hua Chunying said that the Chinese side always hopes that the two countries can properly resolve the relevant dispute through dialogue and negotiation and normalize their relations. China commends and welcomes the latest progress in Ethiopia-Eritrea relations and is willing to join hands with the international community to continue to play a constructive role in promoting the peace, stability and development of the Horn of Africa.
- Egypt: In a statement, the Egyptian Foreign Ministry praised the "historic visit" of the Ethiopian Prime Minister Abiy Ahmed to Asmara, affirming its belief that the visit would herald a "new era", and that their rapprochement could serve as model for other African countries.
- France: The French Foreign Ministry, in an effusive statement, welcomed the "historic", "courageous", and "important" move, praising Abiy's extension of his policies of reconciliation to the field of regional diplomacy, "lending its full support for Prime Minister Abiy Ahmed's vision of the future for his country as well as the rest of the continent", as well Isaias's positive response.
- Germany: A Federal Foreign Office spokesperson issued a statement saying that Prime Minister Abiy and President Isaias "have shown that it is possible to move beyond long years of animosity and to open a new chapter in their relations" and that the declaration of peace and friendship signed by the two leaders "provides grounds for hope that the conflict, which has claimed tens of thousands of lives and displaced hundreds of thousands of people, can be permanently resolved."
- Holy See: Speaking to the faithful at Saint Peter's Square the Sunday preceding the summit, Pope Francis singled out the talks between Ethiopia and Eritrea as cause for optimism, saying that "in the midst of so many conflicts, it's dutiful to point out an initiative that can be called historic", expressing hope that talks between the two nations would "turn on a light of hope for these two countries in the Horn of Africa and for the entire African continent".
- Japan: Foreign Minister Tarō Kōno welcomed the signing of the Joint Statement and expressed its expectation that "the relationship between the two countries will progress further and that the two countries will contribute to the greater stability and prosperity of the Horn of Africa region".
- Kenya: In a statement on Twitter, President Uhuru Kenyatta congratulated Isaias and Abiy "for choosing the path of talking to each other and beginning the journey of friendship," saying that Kenya was a "proud neighbor".
- Russia: A Foreign Ministry spokesperson said that Moscow welcomed the renewal of direct Ethiopian-Eritrean contacts and was "confident that the rapid normalisation of Ethiopian-Eritrean relations," inter alia, "meets the vital interests of the two peoples and will help to create an atmosphere of neighbourliness between them."
- Rwanda: President Paul Kagame, incumbent Chairperson of the African Union, on Twitter praised the two leaders for meeting, saluting them "for their courage and doing the right thing for their people of the two countries", adding "we congratulate you and are with you!"
- Spain: The Spanish Government expressed its "great satisfaction" with the summit, calling the meeting "a key achievement in a region as particularly unstable as the Horn of Africa".
- Turkey: In a written statement, the Turkish Foreign Ministry said: "As a country attaching importance to stability in Africa, Turkey welcomes the steps taken towards the normalization of relations between Ethiopia and Eritrea and the Joint Declaration signed between Eritrea and Ethiopia on 9 July in Asmara, during the visit of H.E. Dr. Abiy Ahmed, Prime Minister of Ethiopia, to Eritrea."
- United Arab Emirates: Sheikh Abdullah bin Zayed Al Nahyan, Minister of Foreign Affairs and International Cooperation, has welcomed the re-establishment of diplomatic ties between Ethiopia and Eritrea. In a statement, he said, "The re-establishment of diplomatic ties will have a positive impact on the security and stability of the two countries in particular, and the Horn of Africa in general."
- United Kingdom: Minister of State for Africa Harriett Baldwin called the joint declaration "a momentous step towards building a lasting peace between Ethiopia and Eritrea" that would "greatly strengthen the political and economic ties that will benefit not just the populations of both countries but also enhance security and prosperity across the Horn of Africa."
- United States: Mike Pompeo, United States Secretary of State, issued a statement "welcoming the July 9 commitment to peace and security", and commending "Prime Minister Abiy of Ethiopia and President Isaias of Eritrea for courageously leading their citizens towards peace, prosperity, and political reform".

Organizations

- European Union: High Representative for Foreign Affairs Federica Mogherini said that the "historic and courageous move" raised "unprecedented prospects for reconciliation and paves the way for enhanced regional cooperation and stability in the Horn of Africa."
- African Union: Moussa Faki, Chairperson of the African Union Commission, praised Isaias and Abiy "for choosing the courageous path of reconciliation, in the interest of their people, the region and Africa as a whole," adding that it provided an example "worthy of emulation by all parties to conflicts and crises in other parts of the continent."
- United Nations: Secretary-General António Guterres hailed the meeting as an "amazing success" while in Addis Ababa shortly before he was due to meet with Prime Minister Abiy, describing it as "illustrative of a new wind of hope blowing across Africa", and that events would render U.N. sanctions against Eritrea obsolete, following its peace deal with Ethiopia.

== Aftermath ==
The evening of his return to Ethiopia, Prime Minister Abiy met with United Nations Secretary-General António Guterres and briefed him on the summit proceedings. As a result of its successful outcome, Abiy requested that the United Nations lift its sanctions—imposed largely due to the efforts of Ethiopian diplomacy—on Eritrea.

Immediately following the summit it was announced that Ethiopian Airlines would resume flights to Asmara the following Monday, 16 July. The state-run Ethiopian Press Agency reported that Ethiopian Airlines would additionally take a 20% stake in Eritrean Airlines, although as of 9 July 2018 this has not yet been confirmed by the management of either airline.

President Isaias made a reciprocal visit to Ethiopia the week immediately following the summit, from 14–16 July. Speaking at a state luncheon hosted by President Mulatu Teshome, Isaias affirmed the unity of Eritrea and Ethiopia, saying "henceforth, anyone who says Eritreans and Ethiopians are two different peoples is one that doesn't know the truth." He visited an industrial park in Awassa and presided over the re-opening of the Eritrean Embassy.

On 11 September 2018, Eritrea–Ethiopia border crossings reopened for the first time since 1998, at Serha–Zalambesa and Debaysima–Burre. In October 2019, Abiy was awarded the Nobel Peace Prize for his work brokering peace.

=== Tigray war ===
The 2018 peace summit had significant repercussions in Tigray. Foreign Policy writer Bronwyn Bruton, peace researcher Kjetil Tronvoll, and journalist Michela Wrong suggested that the surprise warming of relations had derived from a shared animosity towards the TPLF held by both Eritrea, as well as non-Tigrayan Ethiopian officials that have resented the TPLF's dominance in Ethiopian politics since 1991. While relations with Ethiopia were in the process of being normalized, Isaias was heavily critical of the TPLF, describing them as "vultures."

Eritrea was firmly on the side of the Ethiopian government throughout the Tigray war, and was attributed responsibility for high-profile atrocities such as the 2020 Axum massacre. Their outsized role led to them being described by Le Monde contributor Noé Hochet-Bodin as a "shadow [that] looms over the conflict." Former Eritrean Minister of Defence Mesfin Hagos alleged that, before the outbreak of the war, Ethiopia and Eritrea had a secret pact wherein elite units of the Ethiopian military were transported to Eritrean military bases, preparing to "strike out of existence the TPLF".

Although the Pretoria Agreement was signed in November 2022 (formally ending the Tigray war), Eritrea was not a party to it, and continued to occupy parts of Tigray as of late 2024.

=== 2024–present diplomatic crisis ===
Following the initial improvement in relations after 2018, tensions between Eritrea and Ethiopia increased from 2024 onward over regional security concerns, Ethiopia's pursuit of Red Sea access, and wider instability in the Horn of Africa. Ethiopian interest in access to Eritrean ports, including Assab, contributed to renewed diplomatic tensions between the two countries.

As of 7 May 2026, the United States was reported to be planning to lift sanctions against Eritrea, reflecting a strategic shift linked to the increasing geopolitical importance of the Red Sea amid regional tensions and the Iran war. The move was intended to improve U.S.–Eritrea relations and was viewed as part of broader American efforts to strengthen engagement in the Red Sea region. The Wall Street Journal reported that the Trump administration was exploring a reset in ties with Eritrea due to its strategic location along the Red Sea as Iran threatened another major maritime corridor amid conflict with the United States.

The renewed diplomatic focus on Eritrea occurred amid wider regional instability involving Sudan, Somalia, and Ethiopia, as competition over Red Sea routes and regional influence increased. According to an article published by the International Crisis Group on 15 May 2026, U.S. officials believed that a major new conflict between Ethiopia and Eritrea could threaten Ethiopia's growing relationship with Washington.

In a May 2026 article for Foreign Affairs titled The War in Ethiopia Isn’t Over, Hilary Matfess argued that Ethiopia should pursue a diplomatic reset with Eritrea to reduce the risk of renewed conflict and proxy warfare. The article stated that tensions between Ethiopian Prime Minister Abiy Ahmed and the Eritrean government had escalated over security disputes, including Ethiopia's calls for Red Sea access through Eritrean ports. Matfess argued that Ethiopia should seek to reduce tensions with Eritrea and Egypt, and suggested that negotiations involving the United States could contribute to regional stabilization.

== See also ==
- Algiers Agreement (2000)
- Ethiopia–Tigray peace agreement
