= 2010s in Eritrea =

On January 1, 2010, 3 people were killed in an Eritrea–Ethiopia border skirmish.

In an interview on February 22, 2010, President Isaias Afewerki denied to Al Jazeera any siding of the Eritrean government with factions fighting in the Somali Civil War.

In June 2016, Eritrea claimed 200 Ethiopian soldiers were killed and 300 wounded in a battle at Tsorona.
