= Zalambessa massacre =

2020 massacre in eastern Tigray, Ethiopia

Coordinates: 14.52146°N 39.38360°E

- Part of Tigray War
- Location of Zalambessa in Ethiopia
- Location: Zalambessa, Tigray Region, Ethiopia
- Date: 13 November 2020
- Target: Tigrayans
- Attack type: Mass killing; Shelling; Ethnic cleansing
- Deaths: 56 civilians, up to 72 civilians
- Perpetrators: (Ethiopia) Ethiopian National Defence Force (Eritrea) Eritrean Defence Forces

The Zalambessa massacre was a mass extrajudicial killing that took place in Zalambessa in the Tigray Region of Ethiopia during the Tigray War, on 13 November 2020, with some aftermath killings up to 19 November. Zalambessa is a town at the Eritrean border, woreda Gulomahda, Eastern zone of Tigray.

== Massacre ==
The Ethiopian National Defense Force and Eritrean Defence Forces killed dozens of civilians in Zalambessa (Eastern Tigray) on 13 November 2020. It started as indiscriminate shelling on the town, coming from the northern (Eritrean) side during 13 consecutive hours. Then soldiers of both armies went house to house arbitrarily killing civilians. Burials were prohibited and corpses eaten in the streets by hyenas and dogs. Every killing has been carefully documented by some survivors. In one case, which is not at all most extreme, the soldiers entered the house of Haleqa Tewolde Adhanom and his wife Minia Embafrash. They killed both spouses, then occupied the house, and settled there while feasting on the slaughtered goats of the family. They stayed 12 days in the house, eating the 30 goats, and only after that the bodies of the spouses could be buried.

== Perpetrators ==
The inhabitants of Zalambessa interpreted the identity of the perpetrators as Ethiopian and Eritrean soldiers.
