= 2010 Eritrean–Ethiopian border skirmish =

Coordinates: 15°N 39°E

- Part of the Second Afar insurgency and the Eritrean–Ethiopian border conflict
- Eritrea (green) and Ethiopia (orange)
| Date | January 1, 2010 |
| Location | Tsorona-Zalambessa, Eritrea-Ethiopian border |

Belligerents
| Eritrea | Ethiopia |

Commanders and leaders
| (Eritrea) Isaias Afewerki (Eritrea) Sebhat Ephrem | (Ethiopia) Meles Zenawi (Ethiopia) Girma Wolde-Giorgis (Ethiopia) Siraj Fergessa (Ethiopia) Samora Yunis |

Casualties and losses
| 25 killed (Ethiopian Claim) | 10 killed (Eritrean Claim); 2 captured |

The 2010 Eritrean–Ethiopian border skirmish was an armed skirmish between soldiers of the Eritrean and the Ethiopian armies fought at the border town of Zalambesa after Eritrea claimed that Ethiopian forces crossed the border. The Ethiopian Government claimed Eritrea was trying to cover up an internal crisis by implicating Ethiopia.

== Background ==
Relations between Eritrea and Ethiopia have been brittle and bilateral tensions have remained high after both fought each other in the Eritrean–Ethiopian War from 1998 to 2000. Since the end of the war, the two countries have engaged in a number of small-scale border skirmishes.

Eritrea had also recently been slapped with sanctions by the United Nations, after it was accused of supplying arms and weapons to militants and the opposition to the Somalia Government. The sanctions also came after Eritrea refused to deal with a border dispute with neighbouring Djibouti.

== Battle ==
=== Eritrean claims ===
According to the Eritrean Information Ministry, Ethiopian forces crossed the border early on New Year's Day and engaged in a fierce battle with Eritrean troops using small arms, assault rifles, and rocket-propelled grenades. Ethiopian forces quickly withdrew back over the border, with Ethiopia having 10 killed, with 2 Ethiopian soldiers being taken prisoner. Several AK-47 assault rifles, a machine gun, and some radio equipment were left behind by the Ethiopian forces.

=== Ethiopian claims ===
Ethiopian government spokesman Bereket Simon denied that any armed incursion had taken place, and claimed that the Eritreans were trying to cover up an attack by Eritrean rebels in which 25 Eritrean government soldiers were killed.

== See also ==
- Djiboutian–Eritrean border conflict
- Eritrean Army
