= United Nations Security Council Resolution 1430 =

UN Security Council Resolution 1430
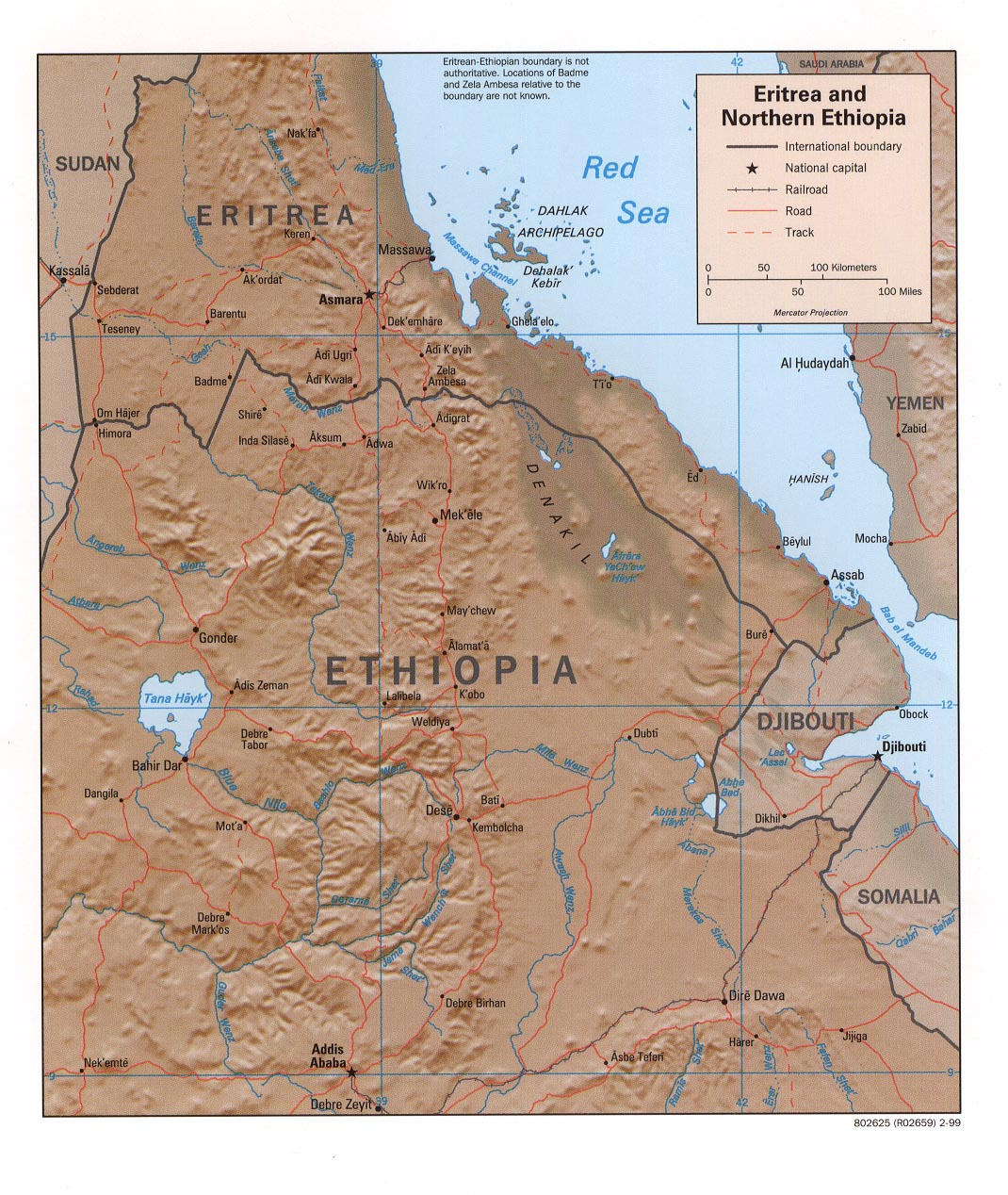
- Eritrea and northern Ethiopia
- Date: 14 August 2002
- Meeting no.: 4,600
- Code: S/RES/1430 (Document)
- Subject: The situation between Eritrea and Ethiopia
- Voting summary: 15 voted for; None voted against; None abstained
- Result: Adopted

Security Council composition
- Permanent members: China; France; Russia; United Kingdom; United States
- Non-permanent members: Bulgaria; Cameroon; Colombia; Guinea; Ireland; Mauritius; Mexico; Norway; Singapore; Syria

United Nations Security Council resolution 1430, adopted unanimously on 14 August 2002, after reaffirming Resolution 1398 (2002) on the situation between Eritrea and Ethiopia, the Council adjusted the mandate of the United Nations Mission in Ethiopia and Eritrea (UNMEE) to assist in the implementation of the decision of the Eritrea-Ethiopia Boundary Commission.

The Security Council recalled the decision on delimitation of the Ethiopia-Eritrea border by the Boundary Commission on 13 April 2002 in accordance with the Algiers Agreement. It reaffirmed the need for both parties to fulfil obligations under international law and to ensure the safety of United Nations and humanitarian personnel.

The mandate of UNMEE was adjusted to assist in the implementation of the decision of the Boundary Commission concerning the Ethiopia-Eritrea border, to include demining in key areas and administrative and logistical support. Both parties Ethiopia and Eritrea were called upon to co-operate with UNMEE during the course of its mandate and with the Boundary Commission particularly with its border demarcation decision.

The Council decided that security arrangements were to remain in effect and for both countries to refrain from unilateral troop or population movements including new settlements near the border. It demanded that UNMEE be allowed full freedom of movement and expressed disappointment that an air corridor had not been established between the capitals of Asmara and Addis Ababa. Furthermore, both Eritrea and Ethiopia were requested to release prisoners of war and adopt confidence-building measures to promote reconciliation.

Finally, further diplomatic efforts were urged and the Council stressed the importance of the demarcation process to allow displaced persons to return home and the normalisation of relations between Eritrea and Ethiopia. Both countries initially accepted Resolution 1430 though Ethiopia later questioned the Border Commission's neutrality and prevented UNMEE from crossing the border into Eritrea.

== See also ==
- Badme
- Eritrean–Ethiopian War
- List of United Nations Security Council Resolutions 1401 to 1500 (2002–2003)
