= Ukrainian involvement in the Eritrean–Ethiopian War =

- Active: Summer 1998 — ?
- Country: Ukraine
- Type: Military advisor
- Size: 300
- Garrison/HQ: Eritrea
- Engagements: Ethiopian-Eritrean War

Group of Ukrainian military specialists in Eritrea is a contingent of military advisers to the Armed Forces of Ukraine and mercenaries to the Eritrean Defence Forces. Ukrainian servicemen provided significant assistance to the country during the Ethiopian-Eritrean War. It is noteworthy that the opposing side used the services of military specialists from Russia.

== Literature ==
- Алексей Андреев. АФРИКАНСКИЙ РОГ: ЗАТИШЬЕ ПЕРЕД БУРЕЙ // Независимая газета : газета. — 29 марта 2000.
- Александр Пинчук. Командировка в Африку // Красная звезда : газета. — 11 апреля 2009.
- Михаил Жирохов. Война в воздухе на Африканском Роге // Уголок неба : авиационная энциклопедия. — 2004.
