= Russian involvement in the Eritrean–Ethiopian War =

- Active: Summer 1998 — December 2000
- Country: Russia
- Type: Military advisor
- Size: 500
- Garrison/HQ: Ethiopia
- Engagements: Eritrean–Ethiopian War

Commanders
- Current commander: Yakim Yanakov

The Group of Russian military specialists in Ethiopia is a contingent of military advisers to the Armed Forces of the Russian Federation and mercenaries to the Ethiopian National Defense Force. Russian servicemen provided significant assistance to the country during the Eritrean–Ethiopian War. It is noteworthy that the opposing side used the services of military specialists from Ukraine.

== Literature ==
- Алексей Андреев. АФРИКАНСКИЙ РОГ: ЗАТИШЬЕ ПЕРЕД БУРЕЙ // Независимая газета : газета. — 29 марта 2000.
- Александр Пинчук. Командировка в Африку // Красная звезда : газета. — 11 апреля 2009.
- Михаил Жирохов. Война в воздухе на Африканском Роге // Уголок неба : авиационная энциклопедия. — 2004.
