= List of districts in the Tigray Region =

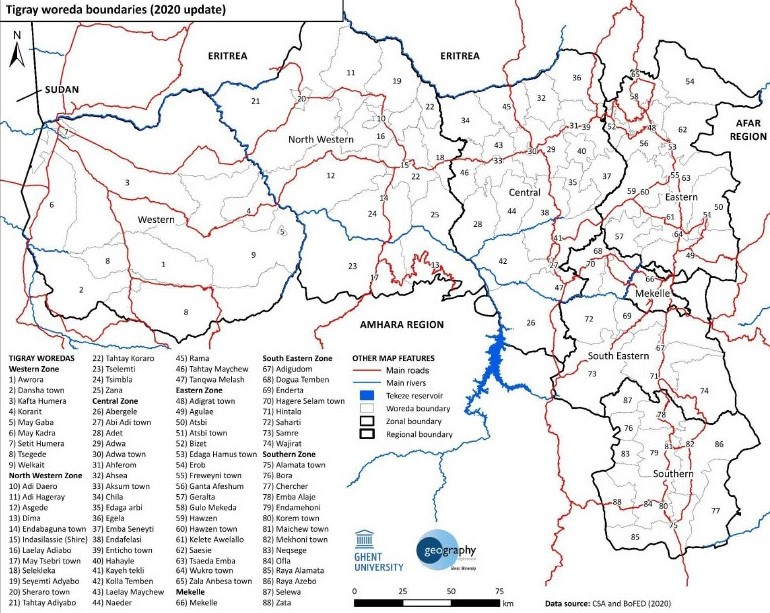
Map of the 88 districts of Tigray as of January 2020

This is a list of the 35 rural woredas, or districts, in the Tigray Region of Ethiopia, as they existed until 2020. The list is compiled from material of the Central Statistical Agency website. There are also urban woredas, which are not included.

Between 2018 and 2020, as part of a reform aimed to deepen and strengthen decentralisation, woredas were reorganised, and new boundaries established. As smaller towns had been growing, they had started providing a larger range of services, such as markets and even banks, that encouraged locals to travel there rather than to their formal woreda centre. However, these locals still had to travel to their local woreda centre for most local government services - often in a different direction. In 2018 and 2019, after multiple village discussions that were often vigorous in the more remote areas, 21 independent urban administrations were added and other boundaries re-drawn, resulting in an increase from 35 to 88 woredas in January 2020.
