= Zalambessa =

Town in Tigray, Ethiopia

Zalambessa ዛላምበሳ
- Location within Ethiopia Location within the Horn of Africa Location within Africa
- Coordinates: 14°31′33″N 39°23′9″E
- Country: Ethiopia
- Region: Tigray
- Zone: Eastern Zone
- Woreda: Gulomkada

Population (2005)
  - Total: 10,551
- Time zone: UTC+03:00

Zalambessa (Tigrigna: ዛላምበሳ) is a town located in the Eastern Zone of Tigray Region, Ethiopia, about 42 kilometers north of Adigrat. It sits on the border with Eritrea.

== History ==
=== 20th century ===
The original village of Zalambessa was fortified by Italian colonial forces during the period of 1936 and 1941. The fortifications were taken over by the Ethiopian military in 1952, when Eritrea was federated with Ethiopia. A portion of the village, named Tserona, remained under Eritrean administration.

During the Ethiopian Civil War, on 15 November 1989, Zalambessa was bombed by the Ethiopian Air Force; no fatalities were reported.

The town's precise border became an issue before and during the Eritrean-Ethiopian War (1998–2000). After the war, the town was left in ruins.

=== 21st century ===
In 2000, Eritrea and Ethiopia signed the Algiers Agreement, which forwarded the border dispute to a boundary commission at the Hague. In the agreement, both parties agreed in advance to comply with the commission's decision. In 2002, a ruling was issued, placing Tserona inside Eritrean territory and Zalambessa within Ethiopia.

According to the Eritrean ministry of information, Ethiopian armed forces crossed the border early on New Year's Day of 2010 and engaged in a fierce battle with Eritrean troops, before quickly withdrawing back over the border, after losing ten soldiers and two more being taken prisoner. Ethiopian government spokesman Bereket Simon denied that any armed incursion had taken place.

== Economy ==
Then-Kuwaiti prime minister Nasser Mohammed Al-Ahmed Al-Sabah announced in July 2009, during a three-day visit to Ethiopia, that his country would provide a $63 million loan to the nation, part of which would be used to build a road between Wukro and Zalambessa.

On 11 September 2018, the Serha-Zalambesa border crossing between Eritrea and Ethiopia reopened for the first time since 1998.

== Demographics ==
Based on figures the Central Statistical Agency of Ethiopia released in 2005, Zalambessa had an estimated total population of 10,551, of whom 5,176 were men and 5,375 were women.

== See also ==
- Zalambessa (district)
- Zalambessa massacre
