= United Nations Security Council Resolution 1312 =

UN Security Council Resolution 1312
- UNMEE medal bar
- Date: 31 July 2000
- Meeting no.: 4,181
- Code: S/RES/1312 (Document)
- Subject: The situation between Eritrea and Ethiopia
- Voting summary: 15 voted for; None voted against; None abstained
- Result: Adopted

Security Council composition
- Permanent members: China; France; Russia; United Kingdom; United States
- Non-permanent members: Argentina; Bangladesh; Canada; Jamaica; Malaysia; Mali; Namibia; Netherlands; Tunisia; Ukraine

United Nations Security Council resolution 1312 is a United Nation Security Council resolution adopted unanimously on 31 July 2000. After reaffirming resolutions 1298 (1999) on the situation between Eritrea and Ethiopia, and 1308 (2000), the council established the United Nations Mission in Ethiopia and Eritrea (UNMEE) in anticipation of a peacekeeping operation subject to future authorisation.

The Security Council praised the Organisation of African Unity (OAU) for facilitating a successful agreement on the cessation of hostilities between Ethiopia and Eritrea. Both countries had asked for United Nations assistance to implement the Cessation of Hostilities Agreement and the Secretary-General was to dispatch a reconnaissance and liaison team to the region.

The resolution then established UNMEE consisting of up to 100 military observers and support staff for an initial period until 31 January 2001 in anticipation of a future peacekeeping mission under the following mandate:

(a) establish and maintain contact with the parties;
(b) visit the military headquarters and units of the parties;
(c) monitor the cessation of hostilities;
(d) prepare for the establishment of the Military Coordination Commission;
(e) assist in plans for a future peacekeeping operation.

The parties were called upon to provide UNMEE with access, assistance and protection, and to facilitate the deployment of mine action experts. An arms embargo imposed in Resolution 1298 would not apply to weapons and materiel for use by the mine service. The resolution also stressed the importance of the demarcation of the border between Eritrea and Ethiopia in accordance with the Cessation of Hostilities Agreement and the Framework Agreement of the Organisation of African Unity. It also commended the Secretariats of the United Nations and OAU for discussing the implementation of the agreements.

Finally, the Secretary-General Kofi Annan was requested to continue preparations for a future peacekeeping mission and provide periodic reports to the council.

== See also ==
- Eritrean–Ethiopian War
- List of United Nations Security Council Resolutions 1301 to 1400 (2000–2002)
