= United Nations Security Council Resolution 1308 =

UN Security Council Resolution 1308
- Prevalence of HIV/AIDS in Africa: darker colours indicate a higher rate of infection
- Date: 17 July 2000
- Meeting no.: 4,172
- Code: S/RES/1308 (Document)
- Subject: The responsibility of the Security Council in the maintenance of international peace and security: HIV/AIDS and international peacekeeping operations
- Voting summary: 15 voted for; None voted against; None abstained
- Result: Adopted

Security Council composition
- Permanent members: China; France; Russia; United Kingdom; United States
- Non-permanent members: Argentina; Bangladesh; Canada; Jamaica; Malaysia; Mali; Namibia; Netherlands; Tunisia; Ukraine

United Nations Security Council resolution 1308 is a United Nation Security Council resolution that was adopted unanimously on 17 July 2000. It was the first resolution of the Security Council to address the impact of HIV/AIDS worldwide. The Security Council asked countries to consider voluntary HIV/AIDS testing and counselling for troops deployed in peacekeeping operations.

Speaking after the unanimous adoption of the United States-sponsored resolution, the American ambassador Richard Holbrooke thanked Security Council members for the "unprecedented resolution on a health issue–the first in the history of the Security Council."

== Resolution ==
=== Observations ===
The security council was concerned about the HIV/AIDS pandemic worldwide, and especially the severity of the crisis in Africa. The UN General Assembly and the UN Economic and Social Council had an important role and there was a need for a co-ordinated effort to address the diseases. The spread of HIV/AIDS had a heavy impact on society, was exacerbated by violence, and could lead to instability and emergency situations if left unchecked. Therefore, a co-ordinated international response was important.

The council also recognised the need to include HIV/AIDS prevention and advice in United Nations peacekeeping missions. It welcomed the 13th International AIDS Conference held in South Africa, the first event of its type to be held in a developing country. Furthermore, it also took note of the Secretary-General Kofi Annan's call to reduce HIV/AIDS infection rates in 15- to 24-year-olds by 25% by 2010.

=== Acts ===
The resolution expressed concern at the impact of HIV/AIDS on international peacekeeping and support personnel. It acknowledged efforts by certain countries to address the issue through national programmes and encouraged those that had not yet done so to co-operate with the international community and the Joint United Nations Programme on HIV/AIDS (UNAIDS) to develop long-term strategies to address the spread of the diseases. The Secretary-General was asked to take further steps in the training of peacekeepers to prevent the diseases.

UNAIDS was encouraged to strengthen cooperation with Member States. The council concluded by expressing an interest in making progress on the issue of access to treatment and care and prevention through discussions with countries, United Nations bodies, international organisations, and industry.

== Individuals ==
Richard Holbrooke's Chief of Staff R.P. Eddy was the principal drafter and U.S. negotiator of the resolution.

== See also ==
- List of countries by HIV/AIDS adult prevalence rate
- List of United Nations Security Council Resolutions 1301 to 1400 (2000–2002)
- United Nations Special Envoy for HIV/AIDS in Africa
