= United Nations Security Council Resolution 1320 =

UN Security Council Resolution 1320
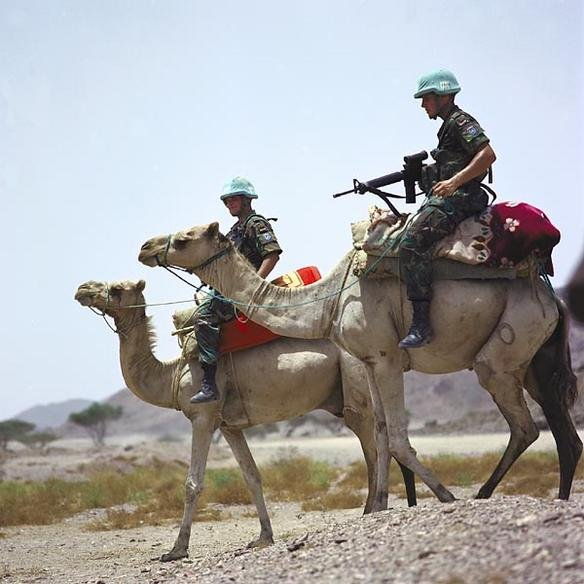
- UNMEE soldiers in Eritrea
- Date: 15 September 2000
- Meeting no.: 4,197
- Code: S/RES/1320 (Document)
- Subject: The situation between Eritrea and Ethiopia
- Voting summary: 15 voted for; None voted against; None abstained
- Result: Adopted

Security Council composition
- Permanent members: China; France; Russia; United Kingdom; United States
- Non-permanent members: Argentina; Bangladesh; Canada; Jamaica; Malaysia; Mali; Namibia; Netherlands; Tunisia; Ukraine

United Nations Security Council resolution 1320 is a United Nation Security Council resolution that was adopted unanimously on 15 September 2000. After reaffirming resolutions 1298 (1999), 1308 (2000) and 1312 (2000) on the situation between Eritrea and Ethiopia, and 1308 (2000), the Council deployed a military component as part of the United Nations Mission in Ethiopia and Eritrea (UNMEE) and extended its mandate until 15 March 2001.

The Security Council affirmed the need for both countries to comply with international humanitarian, human rights and refugee law. It supported the Agreement on Cessation of Hostilities between the governments of Ethiopia and Eritrea and pledged to work with both parties and the Organisation of African Unity (OAU) to implement the agreement.

The resolution authorised the deployment of 4,200 military personnel including 220 observers with the following mandate:

(a) monitor the cessation of hostilities and observance of security commitments by both parties;
(b) monitor the redeployment of Ethiopian troops in areas which were previously not under Ethiopian administration;
(c) monitor the positions of Eritrean forces that were to redeploy 25km away from Ethiopian troops;
(d) monitor the temporary security zone and chair the Military Coordination Commission;
(e) provide assistance for mine action activities;
(f) co-ordinate UNMEE's activities in the security zone and areas adjacent to it.

The two countries were requested to conclude a Status of Forces Agreement within 30 days with the Secretary-General, Kofi Annan and urged to proceed with demining activities. The parties were also asked to co-operate with the International Committee of the Red Cross and ensure safe access for humanitarian personnel.

Acting under Chapter VII of the United Nations Charter, the Council decided that the arms embargo did not apply to United Nations personnel. Finally, both Ethiopia and Eritrea were called upon to continue negotiations without delay to a peace settlement. The termination of the peacekeeping mission was linked to the demarcation of the Ethiopian-Eritrean border.

== See also ==
- Eritrean–Ethiopian War
- List of United Nations Security Council Resolutions 1301 to 1400 (2000–2002)
