= Badme =

Town in Gash-Barka, Eritrea

Badme ባድመ بادم
- Location in Eritrea
- Coordinates: 14°43′34″N 37°48′12″E
- Country: Eritrea
- Region: Gash-Barka

Population (2005)
  - Total: 1,563
- Climate: BSh

Badme (Tigrinya: ባድመ, Arabic: بادم) is a town in the Gash-Barka region of Eritrea, on the border with Ethiopia. Control of the town was at the centre of the Eritrean–Ethiopian border conflict, which lasted from the beginning of the Eritrean–Ethiopian War, in 1998, to the signing of a joint statement at the 2018 Eritrea–Ethiopia summit, twenty years later.

== Territorial dispute ==
The boundaries of Ethiopia and Eritrea follow a frontier defined by the Treaty of Addis Ababa between Ethiopia and Italy, which ruled Eritrea as a colony at the time. However, the frontier near Badme was poorly defined in the treaty, and since Eritrea became a separate nation in 1993, each nation has disputed where the boundary actually runs. The town of Badme was ceded by the TPLF (the predecessor of the EPRDF, Ethiopia's former ruling party) to the EPLF (the predecessor of the PFDJ, Eritrea's ruling organization) in November 1977.

The Ethiopian government considered Badme as one of four towns in Tahtay Adiyabo woreda. In addition to Badme, other disputed areas along the Eritrean–Ethiopian border include Tsorona-Zalambessa and Bure.

In 2000, Eritrea and Ethiopia signed the Algiers Agreement, which forwarded the border dispute to a Hague boundary commission. In the agreement, both parties agreed in advance to comply with the ruling of the border commission. In 2002, the commission ruled on where the boundary ran, placing Badme inside Eritrean territory.

Despite initially agreeing to abide by the terms of the Algiers Agreement, Ethiopia rejected its ruling and refused to withdraw to the border established by the Eritrea–Ethiopia Boundary Commission. As a result, thousands of internally displaced people were in refugee camps, and there was a threat of renewed war.

In 2002, authorities in Ethiopia's Tigray Region resettled some 210 people from central Tigray to Badme.

In 2005, Badme residents voted in Ethiopian elections for the first time since Eritrean independence in 1991.

In June 2018, following a meeting of the executive council of the Ethiopian People's Revolutionary Democratic Front (EPRDF), the ruling party in Ethiopia, the government of Ethiopia announced plans to withdraw from Badme and cede it to Eritrea. A bilateral summit the following month ended the border conflict.

== Tigray War ==
During the Tigray War, attacks were carried out on Badme by the joint Ethiopian and Eritrean armies. On 19 December 2020, a foreign diplomat stated that "thousands" of Eritrean soldiers are engaged in Tigray. Two diplomats claimed that Eritrean troops entered Ethiopia through three northern border towns: Zalambessa, Rama, and Badme.

== Demographics ==
The Central Statistical Agency of Ethiopia in 2005 reported that this town has an estimated total population of 1,563, of whom 834 are men and 729 are women.

== Bibliography ==
- Abbink, Jan (2003). "Badme and the Ethio-Eritrean border: the challenge of demarcation in the post-war period". Africa: Rivista trimestrale di studi e documentazione dell'Istituto italiano per l'Africa e l'Oriente. 58 (2): 219–231. JSTOR 40761693. Archived from the original on 24 January 2018.
- Jonathan Wilkenfeld; Kathleen Young; David Quinn (7 May 2007). Mediating International Crises. Routledge. ISBN 978-1-135-99479-2.
