= Algiers Agreement (2000) =

Peace treaty that ended the Eritrean–Ethiopian War (1998–2000)

Agreement between the Government of the State of Eritrea and the Government of the Federal Democratic Republic of Ethiopia
- Type: Peace treaty
- Context: Eritrean–Ethiopian War
- Signed: 12 December 2000
- Location: Algiers, Algeria
- Mediators: United Nations; Organisation of African Unity; Algeria; European Union
- Signatories: Eritrea; Ethiopia
- Languages: English; French; Chinese; Arabic; Russian; Spanish

Full text
- Algiers Agreement (2000) at Wikisource

The Algiers Agreement was a peace agreement between the governments of Eritrea and Ethiopia that was signed on 12 December 2000, at Algiers, Algeria, to formally end the Eritrean–Ethiopian War, a border war fought by the two countries from 1998 to 2000. In the agreement, the two parties reaffirmed the Agreement on Cessation of Hostilities, which had been signed on 18 June 2000.

The Algiers Agreement provided for the exchange of prisoners and the return of displaced persons and established a Boundary Commission to demarcate the border and a Claims Commission to assess damages caused by the conflict.

== Conditions and structure of the agreement ==
The purpose of the agreement was to:

- End/terminate hostilities permanently and agree to refrain from the threat or use of force.
- Respect and implement fully the provisions of an agreement on cessation of hostilities signed on 18 June 2000.
- Release and repatriate all prisoners of war and all other persons detained.
- Provide humane treatment to each other's nationals and persons of each other's national origin within their respective territories.

The agreement outlined the establishment of three commissions: the Eritrea–Ethiopia Boundary Commission (to delimit and demarcate the border between the two states), the Eritrea–Ethiopia Claims Commission (to assess claims for damages stemming from the war), and an independent and impartial body appointed by the UN Secretary General to investigate the beginnings of the war. But while the commissions were both established, the body to investigate the causes of the war was not.

== Commission structure ==
Both commissions were composed of five members and located in The Hague, Netherlands. Each country was to appoint two commissioners who were not nationals of the country. The president of each commission was selected by the other commissioners. Provision was made that if they failed to agree on a president within 30 days, the Secretary-General of the United Nations would appoint a president after consultation with the parties. The Boundaries Commission and the Claims Commission would work with the Permanent Court of Arbitration to judge each party’s claims.

== Boundary commission ==
On 13 April 2002, the Eritrea–Ethiopia Boundary Commission, in collaboration with Permanent Court of Arbitration in The Hague, agreed upon a "final and binding" verdict. The ruling awarded some territory to each side, but Badme (the flash point of the conflict) was awarded to Eritrea. Both countries initially vowed to accept the decision wholeheartedly the day after the ruling was made official. A few months later, however, Ethiopia requested clarifications, then stated it was deeply dissatisfied with the ruling. In September 2003, Eritrea refused to agree to a new commission, which they would have had to agree to if the old binding agreement was to be set aside, and asked the international community to put pressure on Ethiopia to accept the ruling. In November 2004, Ethiopia accepted the ruling "in principle".

Still, the border question remained in dispute. In September 2007, Ethiopia alleged that Eritrea was violating the agreement, and warned that it could use this as grounds to terminate or suspend the agreement. In November 2007, the EEBC concluded the demarcation phase of the Algiers Agreement; by the end of 2007, however, an estimated 4000 Eritrean troops remained in the 'demilitarized zone' with a further 120,000 along its side of the border. Ethiopia maintained 100,000 troops along its side, and low-scale conflict had continued in the meantime.

== Claims Commission ==
The Claims Commission met and issued awards between 2001-2009. In July 2001, its members convened to decide its jurisdiction, procedures and possible remedies. The result of this sitting was issued in August 2001. In October 2001, following consultations with the Parties, the Commission adopted its Rules of Procedure. In December 2001, the Parties filed their claims with the commission. The claims filed by the Parties relate to such matters as the conduct of military operations in the front zones, the treatment of POWs and of civilians and their property, diplomatic immunities and the economic impact of certain government actions during the conflict. At the end of 2005, awards had been issued on claims on Pensions, and Ports. Partial awards have been issued for claims about: Prisoners of War, the Central Front, Civilians Claims, the Western and Eastern Fronts, Diplomatic, Economic and property losses, and Jus ad bellum.

In a key ruling, on 21 december 2005, they ruled that Eritrea broke international law when it attacked Ethiopia in 1998, triggering the broader conflict.

The Ethiopia–Eritrean Claims Commission ruled that:

15. The areas initially invaded by Eritrean forces on that day [12 May 1998] were all either within undisputed Ethiopian territory or within territory that was peacefully administered by Ethiopia and that later would be on the Ethiopian side of the line to which Ethiopian armed forces were obligated to withdraw in 2000 under the Cease-Fire Agreement of 18 June 2000. In its Partial Award in Ethiopia’s Central Front Claims, the Commission held that the best available evidence of the areas effectively administered by Ethiopia in early May 1998 is that line to which they were obligated to withdraw in 2000. ...

16. Consequently, the Commission holds that Eritrea violated Article 2, paragraph 4, of the Charter of the United Nations by resorting to armed force to attack and occupy Badme,

then under peaceful administration by Ethiopia, as well as other territory in the Tahtay Adiabo and Laelay Adiabo Weredas of Ethiopia, in an attack that began on 12 May 1998, and is liable to compensate Ethiopia, for the damages caused by that violation of international law.

— Eritrea Ethiopia Claims Commission

Christine Gray, in an article in the European Journal of International Law (2006), questioned the jurisdiction of the Claims Commission to decide whether Eritrea had violated international law, saying that "there were many factors which suggested that the Commission should have abstained from giving judgment," and that making this ruling through an arbitration court was inappropriate. Additionally, she stated that the hearing for this claim – according to the Algiers Agreement – was to be heard by a separate commission, and to be an investigation of exclusively factual concern, not compensation.

== Aftermath ==
Overall, while the treaty succeeded in stopping the full-scale war, it failed to fully resolve the border dispute, as the fighting over this would continue until 2018.

=== 2018 peace agreement ===
The Ethiopian government under the leadership of new prime minister Abiy Ahmed unexpectedly announced on 5 June 2018 that it fully accepted the terms of the Algiers Agreement. Ethiopia also announced that it would accept the outcome of the 2002 UN-backed Eritrea-Ethiopia Boundary Commission (EEBC) ruling which awarded disputed territories including the town of Badme to Eritrea.

== See also ==
- 2018 Eritrea–Ethiopia summit
- Ethiopia–Tigray peace agreement
