= Eritrean–Ethiopian border conflict =

Territorial conflict (1998–2018)

- Part of the aftermath of the Eritrean–Ethiopian War
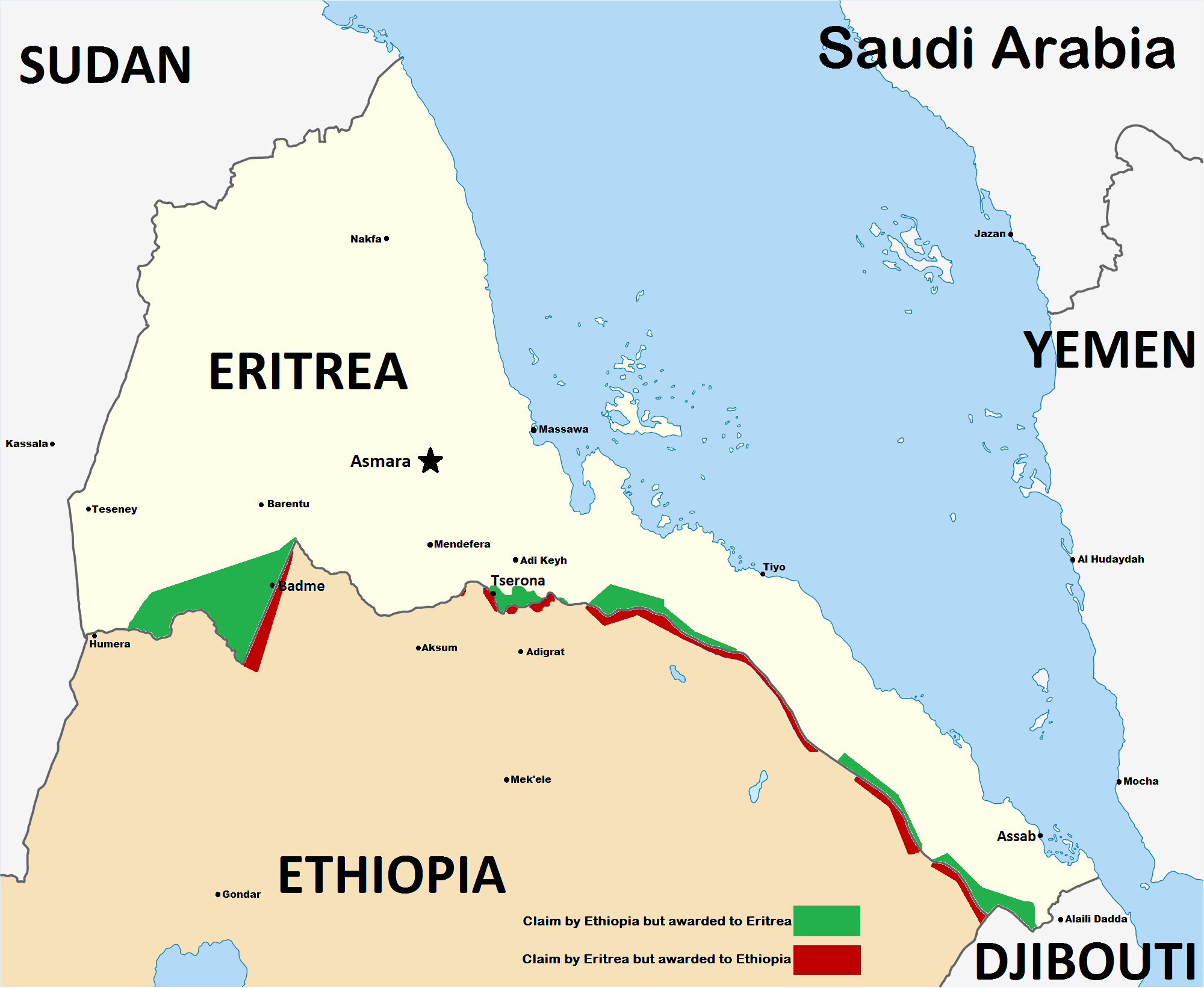
- Territory claimed by both sides of the conflict
Date	6 May 1998 – 9 July 2018 (20 years, 2 months and 3 days)
Location	Eritrean–Ethiopian border
Result	Peace treaty was signed. Full restoration of Badme to Eritrea without preconditions.: Eritrea gave up all of its claims in Ethiopia.; Ethiopia gave up all of its claims in Eritrea.; Diplomatic relations were re-established.
Territorial changes	Badme ceded to Eritrea but occupied until the Tigray War

Belligerents
Eritrea; Rebel allies ARDUF; TPDM; EPPF	Ethiopia; Rebel allies DMLEK; RSADO; SPDM; DFEU; ENSF; Supported by Sudan (Eritrean claim)

Commanders and leaders
(Eritrea) Isaias Afwerki (Eritrea) Sebhat Ephrem; Mohamuda Ahmed Gass	(Ethiopia) Negasso Gidada (Ethiopia) Girma Wolde-Giorgis (Ethiopia) Mulatu Teshome (Ethiopia) Meles Zenawi (Ethiopia) Hailemariam Desalegn (Ethiopia) Abiy Ahmed (Ethiopia) Samora Yunis; Cornelius Osman; Ibrahim Harun

Strength
(Eritrea) 320,000 soldiers (2008); Unknown rebels	(Ethiopia) 252,500 soldiers (2002); Unknown rebels

Casualties and losses
- 650,000 civilians displaced Unknown civilians killed Total; ~100,000 killed

The Eritrean–Ethiopian border conflict was a violent standoff and a proxy conflict between Eritrea and Ethiopia lasting from 1998 to 2018. It consisted of a series of incidents along the then-disputed border; including the Eritrean–Ethiopian War of 1998–2000 and the subsequent Second Afar insurgency.

It included multiple clashes with numerous casualties, including the Battle of Tsorona in 2016. Ethiopia stated in 2018 that it would cede Badme to Eritrea. This led to the Eritrea–Ethiopia summit on 9 July 2018, where an agreement was signed which demarcated the border and agreed a resumption of diplomatic relations.

== Background ==
=== Colonisation and border conflict ===
In March 1870, an Italian shipping company became a claimant to the territory at the northern end of Assab Bay, a deserted but spacious bay about half-way between Annesley Bay to the north and Obock to the south. The area —which had long been dominated by the Ottoman Empire and Egypt was not settled by the Italians until 1880. In 1884, the Hewett Treaty was signed between the British Empire and Ethiopia, ruled by Emperor Yohannes IV (r. 1871–1889). The British Empire promised the highlands of modern Eritrea—and free access to the Massawan coast to Ethiopia in exchange for its help evacuating garrisons from the Sudan, in the then-ongoing Mahdist War. In 1889, amid the disorder that followed the death of Yohannes IV, Italian General Oreste Baratieri occupied the highlands along the Eritrean coast and Italy proclaimed the establishment of a new colony of "Eritrea", (from the Latin name for the Red Sea), with its capital at Asmara in substitution for Massawa. On 2 May 1889, the peace and friendship Treaty of Wuchale was signed between Italy and Ethiopia, under which Italian Eritrea was officially recognised by Ethiopia as part of Italy.

However, Article 17 of the treaty was disputed, as the Italian version stated that Ethiopia was obliged to conduct all foreign affairs through Italian authorities (in effect making Ethiopia an Italian protectorate), while the Amharic version gave Ethiopia considerable autonomy, with the "option" of communicating with third powers through the Italians. This resulted in the First Italo-Ethiopian War, which the Ethiopians won, resulting in the Treaty of Addis Ababa in October 1896. Italy paid reparations of ten million Italian lira. Unusually, the Italians retained most, if not all, of the territories beyond the Mareb-Belessa and May/Muni rivers that they had taken, with Emperor Menelik II (r. 1889–1913) giving away part of Tigray. On 2 August 1928, Ethiopia and Italy signed a new friendship treaty.

=== Ethiopia under Italian rule ===
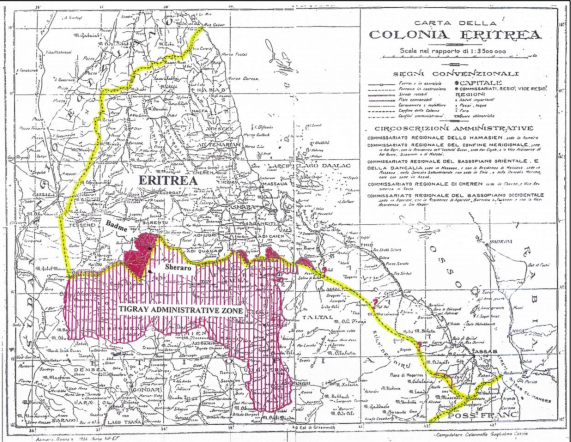
Map of Eritrea 1930 Pre-Annexation

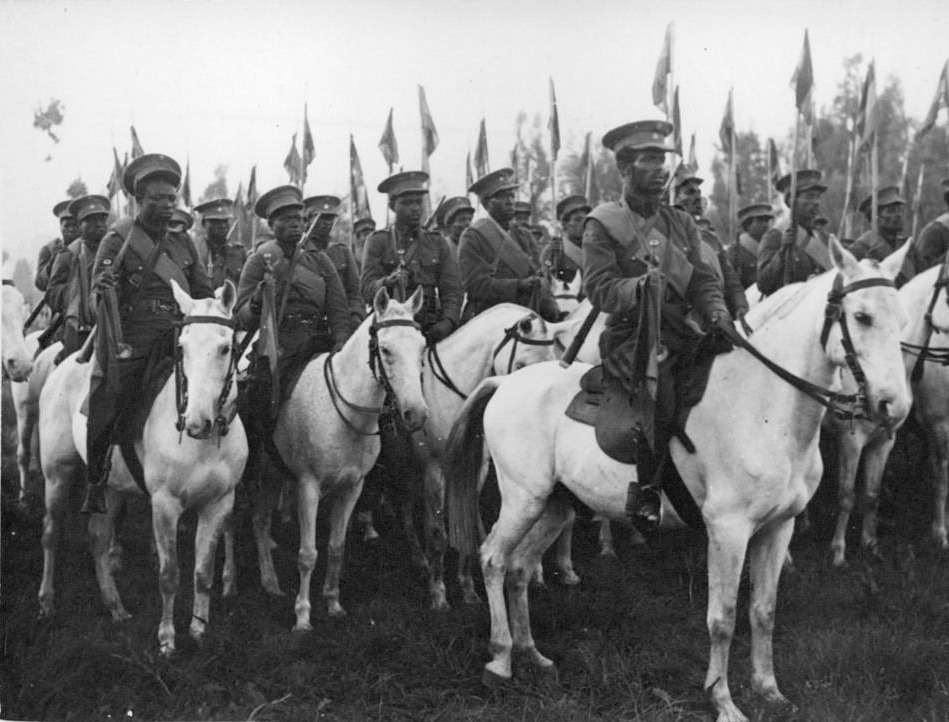
Abyssinian soldiers in 1936 during the Second Italo-Ethiopian War.

On 22 November 1934, Italy claimed that three senior Ethiopian military-political commanders with a force of 1,000 Ethiopian militia arrived near Walwal and formally requested the garrison stationed there, comprising about 60 Somali soldiers, known as dubats, to withdraw. The Somali NCO leading the garrison refused and alerted Captain Cimmaruta, commander of the garrison of Uarder, 20 kilometres (12 mi) away, what had happened. Between 5 and 7 December 1934, for reasons which have never been clearly determined, a skirmish broke out between the garrison and the Ethiopian militia. According to the Italians, the Ethiopians attacked the Somalis with rifle and machine-gun fire. According to the Ethiopians, the Italians attacked them, supported by two tanks and three aircraft. According to historian Anthony Mockler 107 Ethiopians were killed. By 3 October 1935, the Italian Army led by General Emilio De Bono launched an invasion of Ethiopia, without a declaration of war. This was the start of a new war called the Second Italo-Ethiopian War. In May 1936, the Italian Army occupied the Ethiopian capital Addis Ababa. The occupied country was annexed into the Italian East African colony together with the other Italian east African colonies.

On 10 June 1940, Italy declared war on Britain and France; in March 1941, Britain began a campaign to capture the Italian-held territory in the region. By November, the British had occupied the whole Italian East African colony. However thousands of Italian soldiers began conducting a guerrilla war within their former colony which lasted until October 1943. After the end of WWII, Ethiopia regained her independence, and Eritrea was placed under Britain military administration.

== Prelude ==
=== Eritrea as part of Ethiopia ===
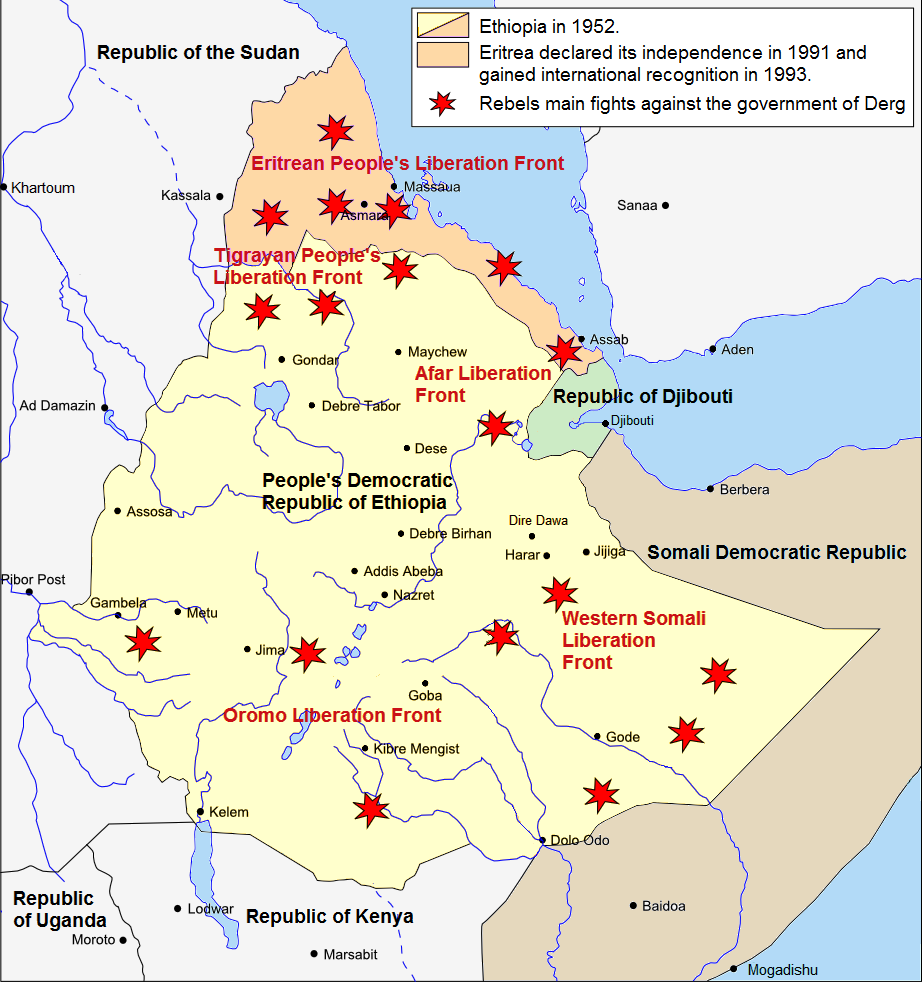
The situation during the Ethiopian Civil War.

After the war there was a debate as to what would happen to Eritrea. After the Italian communists' victory in the 1946 Italian general election they supported returning Eritrea to Italy under a trusteeship or as a colony. The Soviet Union similarly wished to make it their trustee; and tried, unsuccessfully, to achieve this by diplomatic means.

Ethiopian Emperor Haile Selassie I (r. 1930–1974) also claimed Eritrea. In 1952 the United Nations decided that Eritrea would become part of the Ethiopian Empire. Eritrea became a special autonomous region within a federated Ethiopia.

In 1958, a group of Eritreans founded the Eritrean Liberation Front (ELF). The organisation mainly consisted of Eritrean students, professionals and intellectuals. It engaged in clandestine political activities intended to cultivate resistance to the centralising policies of the imperial Ethiopian state. During the following decade the Emperor decided to dissolve the federation between Ethiopia and Eritrea, annexing the special region and bringing it under direct rule.

This resulted in an almost thirty-year long armed struggle known as the Eritrean War of Independence. The ELF engaged in armed conflict against the Ethiopian Government from 1 September 1961. In 1970 a group called the Eritrean People's Liberation Front (EPLF) broke off from the ELF. They were fierce rivals and in February 1972, the First Eritrean Civil War broke out between them. Their rivalry paused in 1974, and calls for the conflict to stop were finally heeded. These calls for peace came from local villagers at a time when the independence movement was close to victory over Ethiopia. On 12 September 1974, a successful coup d'état was carried out against the Emperor led by Lieutenant General Aman Andom. The government was led by members of the pro-Soviet Ethiopian military, which established an almost seven-year long military junta.

The ELF-EPLF's peace lasted only six years; in February 1980 the EPLF declared war on the ELF, after which the ELF and the Soviet Union started secret negotiations. The Second Eritrean Civil War lasted until 1981, and the EPLF emerged victorious. The ELF was driven out of Eritrea into Sudan. On 27 May 1991 the new Ethiopian Transitional Government was formed after the fall of the pro-Soviet government. The Ethiopian Transitional Government promised to hold a referendum, within two years in the region. The referendum was held between 23 and 25 April 1993 with 99.81% voting in favour of independence. On 4 May 1993 the official independence of Eritrea was established. However, the border between Ethiopia and newly independent Eritrea was not clearly defined. After border skirmishes in late 1997, the two countries attempted to negotiate their boundary. In October 1997, Ethiopia presented the Eritrean Government a map showing Eritrean-claimed areas as part of Ethiopia.

== History ==
=== Major combat phase (1998–2000) ===
On 6 May 1998, border clashes erupted between Ethiopia and Eritrea, killing several Eritrean civilians in the Eritrea town of Badme. Ethiopian soldiers attacked Eritrean civilians and Eritreans soldiers retaliated. (Note: The Eritreans describe the start of the war thus: "after a series of armed incidents during which several Eritrean officials were murdered near the disputed village of Badme, Ethiopia declared total war as on 13 May and mobilised its armed forces for a full-scale assault on Eritrea.") According to a 2005 ruling by the Permanent Court of Arbitration, Eritrea triggered the war by invading Ethiopia.

On 13 May 1998, Eritrean radio described the incidents as a "total war" policy from Ethiopia, and claimed that the Ethiopian Army was mobilising for a full assault against Eritrea. The Claims Commission (established by the Algiers peace agreement) found that this was, in essence, an affirmation of the existence of a state of war between belligerents, not a declaration of war, and that Ethiopia also notified the United Nations Security Council, as required under Article 51 of the UN Charter. On 1 March 1999 Ethiopia declares victory over Eritrea by recapturing the Badme region on the Eritrea side it denies its defeat. By the time Ethiopian forces had broken through Eritrea's fortified front and was 10 kilometres (6.2 mi) deep into Eritrean territory, Eritrea accepted the Organisation of African Unity (OAU) peace plan on 27 February 1999. The "proximity talks" broke down in early May 2000 "with Ethiopia accusing Eritrea of imposing unacceptable conditions". On 12 May the Ethiopians launched an offensive that broke through the Eritrean lines between Shambuko and Mendefera, crossed the Mareb River, and cut the road between Barentu and Mendefera, the main supply line for Eritrean troops on the western front of the fighting. Ethiopia declared the war was over at 25 May 2000. At the end of May 2000, Ethiopia occupied about a quarter of Eritrea's territory.

=== Post-war conflict on the border (2000–2018) ===
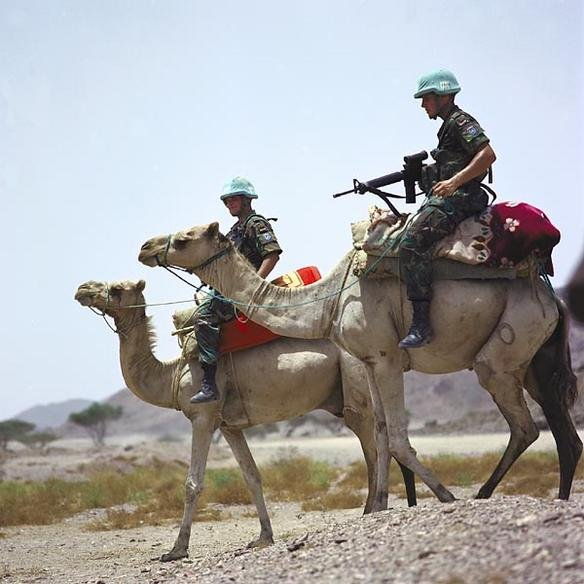
United Nations soldiers, part of the United Nations Mission in Ethiopia and Eritrea, monitoring Eritrea–Ethiopia boundary (2005).

After a cease-fire was established on 18 June 2000, both parties agreed to have a 25-kilometre-wide (16 mi) demilitarised zone called the Temporary Security Zone (TSZ). It was patrolled by the United Nations Mission in Ethiopia and Eritrea (UNMEE) an organisation for the border stabilisation and the prevention of future conflicts between the countries. On 31 July 2000, the UNMEE was officially launched and started patrolling the border. On 12 December 2000, a peace agreement was signed in Algiers. In August 2002 Eritrea released all the Ethiopian POWs.

Both countries vowed to accept the decision wholeheartedly the day after the ruling was made official. A few months later Ethiopia requested clarifications, then stated it was deeply dissatisfied with the ruling. In September 2003 Eritrea refused to agree to a new commission, which they would have had to agree to if the old binding agreement was to be set aside, and asked the international community to put pressure on Ethiopia to accept the ruling. In November 2004, Ethiopia accepted the ruling "in principle".

==== 2005–2006 ====
On 10 December 2005, Ethiopia announced it was withdrawing some of its forces from the Eritrean border "in the interests of peace". Then, on 15 December the United Nations began to withdraw peacekeepers from Eritrea in response to a UN resolution passed the previous day.

On 21 December 2005, a commission at the Permanent Court of Arbitration in The Hague ruled that Eritrea broke international law when it attacked Ethiopia in 1998, triggering the broader conflict.

Ethiopia and Eritrea subsequently remobilized troops along the border, leading to fears that the two countries could return to war. On 7 December 2005, Eritrea banned UN helicopter flights and ordered Western members (particularly from the United States and Europe) of the UN peacekeeping mission on its border with Ethiopia to leave within 10 days, sparking concerns of further conflict with its neighbour. In November 2006 Ethiopia and Eritrea boycotted an Eritrea–Ethiopia Boundary Commission meeting at The Hague which would have demarcated their disputed border using UN maps. Ethiopia was not there because it does not accept the decision and as it will not allow physical demarcation it will not accept map demarcation, and Eritrea was not there because although it backs the commission's proposals, it insists that the border should be physically marked out.

==== 2007–2011 ====
In September 2007, Kjell Bondevik, a United Nations' official, warned that the border conflict could cause a new war. At the November 2007 deadline, some analysts feared the restart of the border war but the date passed without any conflict. There were many reasons why war did not resume. Former U.S. Ambassador David Shinn said both Ethiopia and Eritrea were in a bad position. Many feared the weak Eritrean economy is not improving like those of other African nations, while others say Ethiopia was still bogged down in its intervention in Somalia. David Shinn said Ethiopia has "a very powerful and so far disciplined national army that made pretty short work of the Eritreans in 2000 and the Eritreans have not forgotten that." But he stated Ethiopia is not interested in war because America would condemn Ethiopia if it initiated the war saying "I don't think even the US could sit by and condone an Ethiopian initiated attack on Eritrea."

On 16 January 2008, the Eritrean Government said they gave up all of its claims in Ethiopia. In February, the UNMEE commenced pulling its peacekeepers out of Eritrea due to Eritrean Government restrictions on its fuel supplies. On 30 July 2008, the Security Council held a vote which ended the UN mission the next day. In June 2009 a rebel group called Democratic Movement for the Liberation of the Eritrean Kunama (DMLEK) joined the fight against the Eritrean Government with the pro-Ethiopian Red Sea Afar Democratic Organisation (RSADO). On 23 April 2010, RSADO and the Eritrean National Salvation Front (ENSF) attacked an Eritrean Army's base, they also took it over for 3 hours until 6 a.m. They killed at least 11 Eritreans soldiers and wounded more than 20 others.

==== 2012–2018 ====
The conflict deepened in March 2012, when Ethiopia launched an offensive into Eritrean-held territory. Three Eritrean military camps were attacked and a number of people were killed or captured. Several weeks prior to the offensive, Ethiopia had blamed Eritrea for supporting the Ethiopian rebels who had staged the Afar region tourist attack in northern Ethiopia, in which five Western tourists were killed. On 7 September 2013, two Ethiopian-supported Eritrean rebel groups RSADO and the Saho People's Democratic Movement (SPDM) agreed to fight together against the Eritrean Government. In December 2013 the Ethiopian Army crossed the border to attack some rebel camps in Eritrea.

In June 2016, Eritrea claimed that 200 Ethiopian soldiers were killed and 300 wounded in a battle at Tsorona. On 22 June 2016 Eritrea warned the UN Human Rights Council that a new war between Ethiopia and the country can restart as Ethiopia was planning for a new attack.

==== 2018 Eritrea–Ethiopia summit ====
On 2 April 2018, former Ethiopian Prime Minister Hailemariam Desalegn resigned due to the unrest and a new Ethiopian Prime Minister, Abiy Ahmed, was appointed. On 5 June 2018 Ahmed announced that Ethiopia relinquished its claims on the disputed areas and that the conflict with Eritrea was at an end. He arrived on 8 July 2018 in Asmara, Eritrea where his counterpart, President Isaias Afwerki, greeted him at Asmara International Airport. The next day both leaders signed a five-point Joint Declaration of Peace and Friendship, which declared that "the state of war between Ethiopia and Eritrea has come to an end; a new era of peace and friendship has been opened" and ceded Badme to Eritrea.

== Proxy conflict ==
Since the cease-fire was established, both nations have been accused of supporting dissidents and armed opposition groups against each other. John Young, a Canadian analyst and researcher for IRIN, the United Nations Office for the Coordination of Humanitarian Affairs news agency, reported that "the military victory of the EPRDF (Ethiopia) that ended the Ethiopia–Eritrea War, and its occupation of a swath of Eritrean territory, brought yet another change to the configuration of armed groups in the borderlands between Ethiopia and Eritrea. Asmara replaced Khartoum as the leading supporter of anti-EPRDF armed groups operating along the frontier". However, Ethiopia is also accused of supporting rebels opposed to the Eritrean government.

In 2006 the Ethiopian Government deployed its forces in its neighbour country Somalia, backing the government by fighting against the Islamists. The Ethiopian and Somali governments accused Eritrea of backing the Islamists in the region, in reaction the Somali Government started backing the Eritrean rebels. In April 2007 Ethiopia accuses also Eritrea for supporting the rebel groups like the Ogaden National Liberation Front (ONLF) and the Afar Revolutionary Democratic Unity Front (ARDUF). In April 2011 Ethiopia openly declared its support for Eritrean rebel groups. According to the Global Security in 2014 the rebel group Tigray People's Democratic Movement (TPDM) which is active in the Tigray Region was the most important rebel group in Eritrea fighting against the Ethiopian Government, Eritrea also financed and train the group.

In January 2015, the pro-Eritrean rebel groups, the Ginbot 7 and the Ethiopian People's Patriotic Front (EPPF) merged to fight against the Ethiopian Government, and called itself the Arbegnoch – Ginbot 7 for Unity and Democracy Movement (AGUDM). On 25 July 2015, Ginbot 7 decided to go in an armed resistance and goes into exile in Eritrea. On 10 October 2016, the Ethiopian Government claimed that Eritrea was also helping Oromo Liberation Front [OLF] and that Eritrea and Egypt were behind the Oromo protests in Ethiopia.

== Impact and aftermath ==
Soon after the peace summit, many Ethiopian rebels returned to Ethiopia, including TPDM, OLF and Ginbot 7. On 10 October, the last 2,000 of TPDM members returned to Ethiopia. The UN lifted its sanctions on 14 November 2018 after nine years against Eritrea. Eritrea made also a joint agreement with Somalia and Ethiopia to co-operate with each other. Later on 13 December 2018 President Afwerki went to Somalia for the first time in two decades.

During the war, between 70,000 and 300,000 people were killed and 650,000 displaced, of whom 19,000–150,000 were Eritrean soldiers and 80,000–123,000 were Ethiopian soldiers. The casualties after the war were between 523 and 530 dead in the Second Afar insurgency alone. On the Eritrean side, the casualties of the conflict were between 427 and 434 Eritreans killed, 30 pro-Eritrean rebels killed, 88 Eritrean soldiers wounded and 2 Eritreans captured. The Ethiopian side's losses were 49 Ethiopian soldiers (claimed by rebels), and five civilians killed, also, 23 civilians were kidnapped and three others were wounded. According to Eritrea, the casualties on the two countries' border were at least 18 Eritreans and over 200 Ethiopians.

== Timeline ==
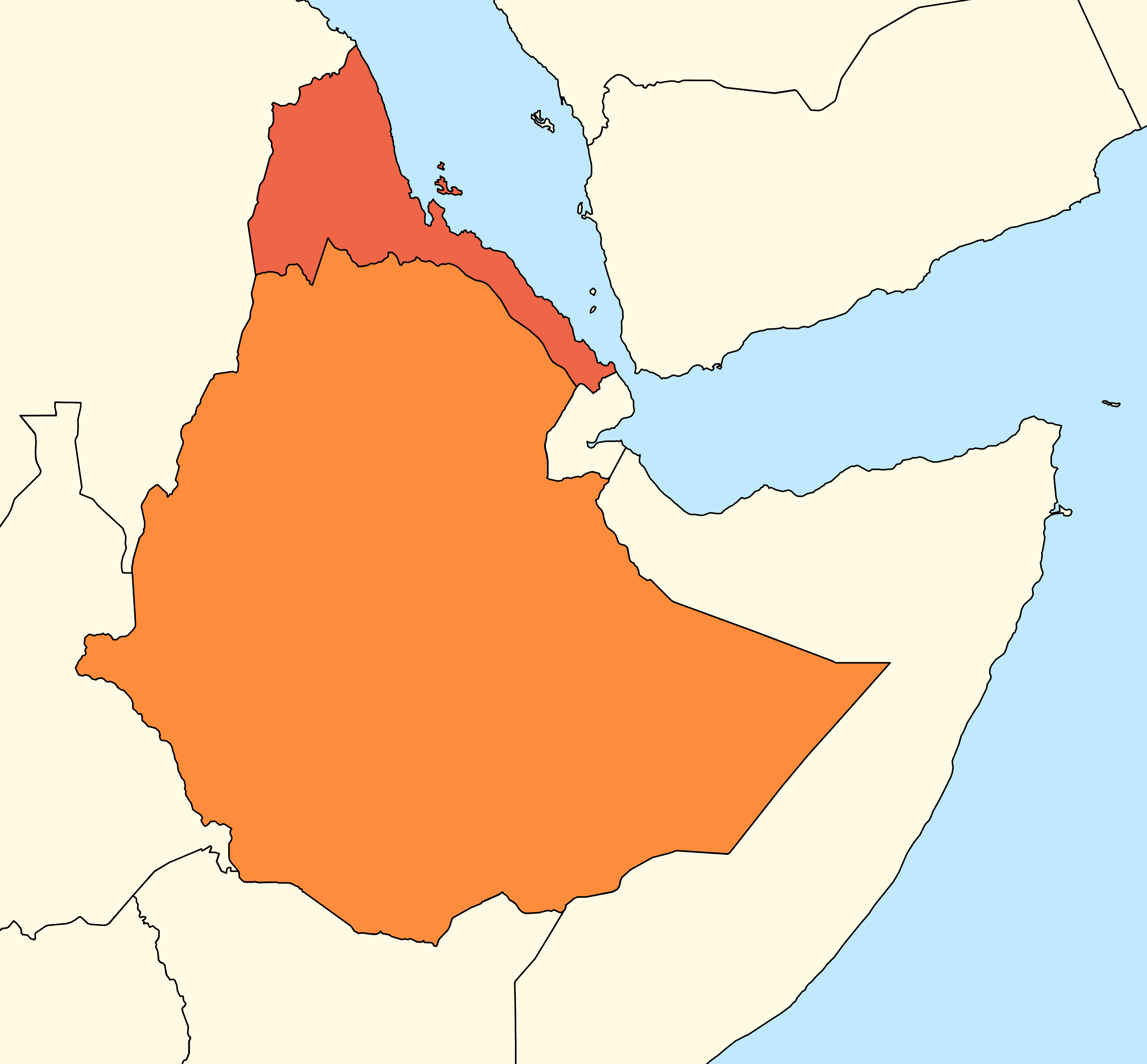
Ethiopia and Eritrea, highlighted.

On 19 June 2008 the BBC published a time line (which they update periodically) of the conflict and reported that the "Border dispute rumbles on":

* 2007 September – War could resume between Ethiopia and Eritrea over their border conflict, warns United Nations special envoy to the Horn of Africa, Kjell Magne Bondevik.

- 2007 November – Eritrea accepts border line demarcated by international boundary commission. Ethiopia rejects it.
- 2008 January – UN extends mandate of peacekeepers on Ethiopia–Eritrea border for six months. UN Security Council demands Eritrea lift fuel restrictions imposed on UN peacekeepers at the Eritrea–Ethiopia border area. Eritrea declines, saying troops must leave border.
- 2008 February – UN begins pulling 1,700-strong peacekeeper force out due to lack of fuel supplies following Eritrean government restrictions.
- 2008 April – UN Secretary-General Ban Ki Moon warns of likelihood of new war between Ethiopia and Eritrea if peacekeeping mission withdraws completely. Outlines options for the future of the UN mission in the two countries.
- Djibouti accuses Eritrean troops of digging trenches at disputed Ras Doumeira border area and infiltrating Djiboutian territory. Eritrea denies charge.
- 2008 May – Eritrea calls on UN to terminate peacekeeping mission.
- 2008 June – Fighting breaks out between Eritrean and Djiboutian troops.
- 2016 June – Battle of Tsorona between Eritrean and Ethiopian troops

— BBC

In August 2009, Eritrea and Ethiopia were ordered to pay each other compensation for the war.

In March 2011, Ethiopia accused Eritrea of sending bombers across the border. In April, Ethiopia acknowledged that it was supporting rebel groups inside Eritrea. In July, a United Nations Monitoring Group accused Eritrea of being behind a plot to attack an African Union summit in Addis Ababa, the capital of Ethiopia, in January 2011. Eritrea stated the accusation was a total fabrication.

In January 2012, five European tourists were killed and another two were kidnapped close to the border with Eritrea in the remote Afar Region in Ethiopia. In early March the kidnappers announced that they had released the two kidnapped Germans. On 15 March, Ethiopian ground forces attacked Eritrean military posts that they stated were bases in which Ethiopian rebels, including those involved in the January kidnappings, were trained by the Eritreans.

== See also ==
- Djiboutian–Eritrean border conflict
- Eritrean War of Independence
- Ethiopian Civil War
