= List of rebel groups in Ethiopia =

This is an incomplete list of rebel groups in Ethiopia currently and formerly active in the country.

== Ethiopian Civil War (1974–1991) ==
Name	Abbreviation	Founded	Location	Notes
Afar Liberation Front	ALF	1975	Afar Region	Armed wing disarmed after the civil war and became a political party.
All-Ethiopia Socialist Movement	MEISON	1968		Became a member of the UEDF coalition.
Amhara National Democratic Movement	ANDM	1982	Wollo Province	Became a member of the EPRDF coalition.
Coalition of Ethiopian Democratic Forces	COEDF	????	No specific region	Formed by former members of MEISON and the EPRP.
Eritrean Liberation Front	ELF	1961	Eritrean Province	
Eritrean People's Liberation Front	EPLF	1970	Eritrean Province	Disbanded following the independence of Eritrea and became the People's Front for Democracy and Justice (PFDJ) in 1994.
Ethiopian Democratic Union	EDU	1974	No specific region	Merged with the Ethiopian Democratic Party to form the Ethiopian Democratic Unity Party.
Ethiopian People's Revolutionary Party	EPRP	1972	No specific region	
Gambela People's Liberation Movement	GPLM	1985	Gambela Region	
Horyaal Democratic Front	HDF	1977	Somali Region	
Islamic Front for the Liberation of the Oromo	IFLO	1985	East Hararghe Zone	Continued armed insurgency after the civil war.
Kefagn Patriotic Front	KPF	????	Eritrean Province	
Marxist–Leninist League of Tigray	MLLT	1983	No specific region	Part of the Tigray People's Liberation Front (TPLF).
Ogaden National Liberation Front	ONLF	1984	Somali Region	Continued armed insurgency after the civil war.
Oromo Liberation Front	OLF	1973	Oromia Region	Continued armed insurgency after the civil war.
Oromo Peoples' Democratic Organization	OPDO	1982	Oromia Region	
Popular Liberation Forces	PLF	????	Eritrean Province	
Tigray People's Liberation Front	TPLF	1975	Tigray Region	
Western Somali Liberation Front	WSLF	1973	Somali Region	

== Post-Cold War (1991–present) ==
Name	Abbreviation	Founded	Location	Notes
Afar Revolutionary Democratic Unity Front	ARDUF	1993	Afar Region	
Democratic Front for Eritrean Unity	DFEU	????	Afar Region	Allied with the Ethiopian government.
Democratic Movement for the Liberation of the Eritrean Kunama	DMLEK	????	Afar Region	Allied with the Ethiopian government.
Eritrean National Salvation Front	ENSF	????	Afar Region	Allied with the Ethiopian government.
Ethiopian Democratic Party	EDP	1999	No specific region	Became a political party after the civil war.
Ethiopian People's Patriotic Front	EPPF	1998	Ethiopia–Eritrea border	
Ginbot 7	None	2005	No specific region	Accused by the Ethiopian government of attempting a coup in 2009.
Islamic Front for the Liberation of the Oromo	IFLO	1985	East Hararghe Zone	Continued armed insurgency after the civil war.
Issa and Gurgura Liberation Front	IGLF	1991	Ethiopia–Somalia border	Defunct since 1992.
Ogaden National Liberation Front	ONLF	1984	Somali Region	Continued armed insurgency after the civil war.
Oromo Liberation Front	OLF	1973	Oromia	Continued armed insurgency after the civil war.
Oromo Liberation Front — Shane Group	OLF-SG		Oromia Region	
Red Sea Afar Democratic Organisation	RSADO	1999	Afar Region	Allied with the Ethiopian government.
Saho People's Democratic Movement	SPDM	????	Afar Region	Allied with the Ethiopian government.
Sidama National Liberation Front	SLF	1999	Sidama Region	
Tigray People's Liberation Front	TPLF	1975	Tigray Region	
