= List of Ethiopian flags =

This is a list of flags used in Ethiopia. For more information about the national flag, see the flag of Ethiopia.

== National flag ==
Flag	Date	Use	Description
	2009–Present	Flag of Ethiopia	A horizontal tricolour of green, yellow and red with the National Emblem superimposed at the center.

== Military flags ==
Flag	Date	Use	Description
	2021–Present	Flag of the Ethiopian National Defense Force	
	2009–2021	Flag of the Ethiopian National Defense Force	
	1996–2009	Flag of the Ethiopian National Defense Force	

=== Ethiopian Navy ===
Flag	Date	Use	Description
	2019–present	War Ensign of Ethiopia	
	1975–1996	War Ensign of Ethiopia	
	1974–1975	War Ensign of Ethiopia	
	1955–1974	War Ensign of Ethiopia	

=== Ethiopian Air Force ===
Flag	Date	Use	Description
	?–Present	Ethiopian Air Force flag	

== Ethnic flags ==
Flag	Date	Use	Description
		Flag of Kunama people	A Horizontal tricolour of black, red and white with a flower in the white stripe.
		Flag of Saho people	A Horizontal tricolour of black (top), white and black with a 5-pointed star in the canton.
		Flags of Wolayta people	
		Flag of Kafficho people	
		Flag of Dawro people	
		Flags of Oromo people	
		Flags of Amhara people	
		Flag of Tigrayans	
		Flag of Agaw people	

== Political flags ==
Flag	Date	Party	Description
Current
	2021–Present	United Front of Ethiopian Federalist and Confederalist Forces	
	2021–Present	Agew Liberation Front	
	2021–Present	Gambella Peoples Liberation Army	
	2009–present	Oromo Federalist Congress	
	1999–Present	Sidama National Liberation Front	
	1999–Present	Red Sea Afar Democratic Organisation	
	1984–Present	Ogaden National Liberation Front	
	1993–Present	Afar Revolutionary Democratic Unity Front	
	1985–Present	Islamic Front for the Liberation of Oromia	
	1975–Present	Tigray People's Liberation Front	
	1975–Present	Afar Liberation Front	
	1973–Present	Oromo Liberation Front	
		Crown Council of Ethiopia	
		Saho People's Democratic Movement	
		Democratic Movement for the Liberation of the Eritrean Kunama	
		Somali State Resistance	
		Benishangul People's Liberation Movement	
		Gambella Peoples Liberation Army	
	2018–present	Fano (militia)	
		Benishangul People's Liberation Movement	
Former
	1985–1998	Gambela People's Liberation Movement	
	1984–1991	Workers' Party of Ethiopia	
	1982–2019	Oromo Democratic Party	
	1982–2019	Oromo Peoples' Democratic Organization/Oromo Democratic Party	
	1973–1989	Western Somali Liberation Front	

== Regions ==
Flag	Administrative division	Adopted	Ref
	Addis Ababa		
	Afar	2012–present	
	Amhara	1999–present	
	Benishangul-Gumuz		
	Central Ethiopia	2023–present	
	Dire Dawa		
	Gambela		
	Harari		
	Oromia		
	Sidama	2020–present	
	Somali	2018–present	
	South Ethiopia	2023–present	
	South West Ethiopia Peoples' Region	2021–present	
	Tigray		

=== Historical flags ===
Sultanate of Aussa (1734–1937)

Emirate of Harar (1875–1884)

Afar Region (1994–2012)

Somali Region (2008–2018)

Sidama Region (2020), used before the creation of the region, gradually replaced by a new design.

Southern Nations, Nationalities, and Peoples' Region (?–2023)

== Historical flags ==
Flag	Date	Use	Description
	1270–1853	Flag of The Ethiopian Empire	A horizontal tricolour of Yellow, Red and Green.
	1875–1881	A horizontal tricolour of red, white and purple with the Lion of Judah superimposed at the center. Disputed early version of the post-1897 flag.	
	1270–1897	3 triangular pennants of red, yellow and green.	
	1897–1914	A horizontal tricolour of red, yellow and green with the first Ethiopic letter of Emperor Menelik's name superimposed at the center.	
	1897–1936; 1941–1974	Official banner of the Emperor and flag of Ethiopia from 1914	A horizontal tricolour of green, yellow and red with the Lion of Judah superimposed at the center.
	1974–1975	Flag of The Derg	A horizontal tricolour of green, yellow and red with the Lion of Judah superimposed at the center (without the crown and with a spear).
	1975–1987	Flag of The Derg	A horizontal tricolour of green, yellow and red with the National Emblem superimposed at the center.
	1987–1991	Flag of The People's Democratic Republic of Ethiopia	A horizontal tricolour of green, yellow and red with the National Emblem superimposed at the center.
	1991–1996	Flag of The Transitional Government of Ethiopia	A horizontal tricolour of green, yellow and red with the National Emblem superimposed at the center.
	1996–2009	Flag of Federal Democratic Republic of Ethiopia	A horizontal tricolour of green, yellow and red with the National Emblem superimposed at the center.

== Imperial standards ==
Flag	Date	Use	Description
	1930–1974	Obverse	
	1930–1974	Reverse	

== See also ==
- Flag of Ethiopia
- Emblem of Ethiopia
