= Eritrea–Ethiopia border =

International border

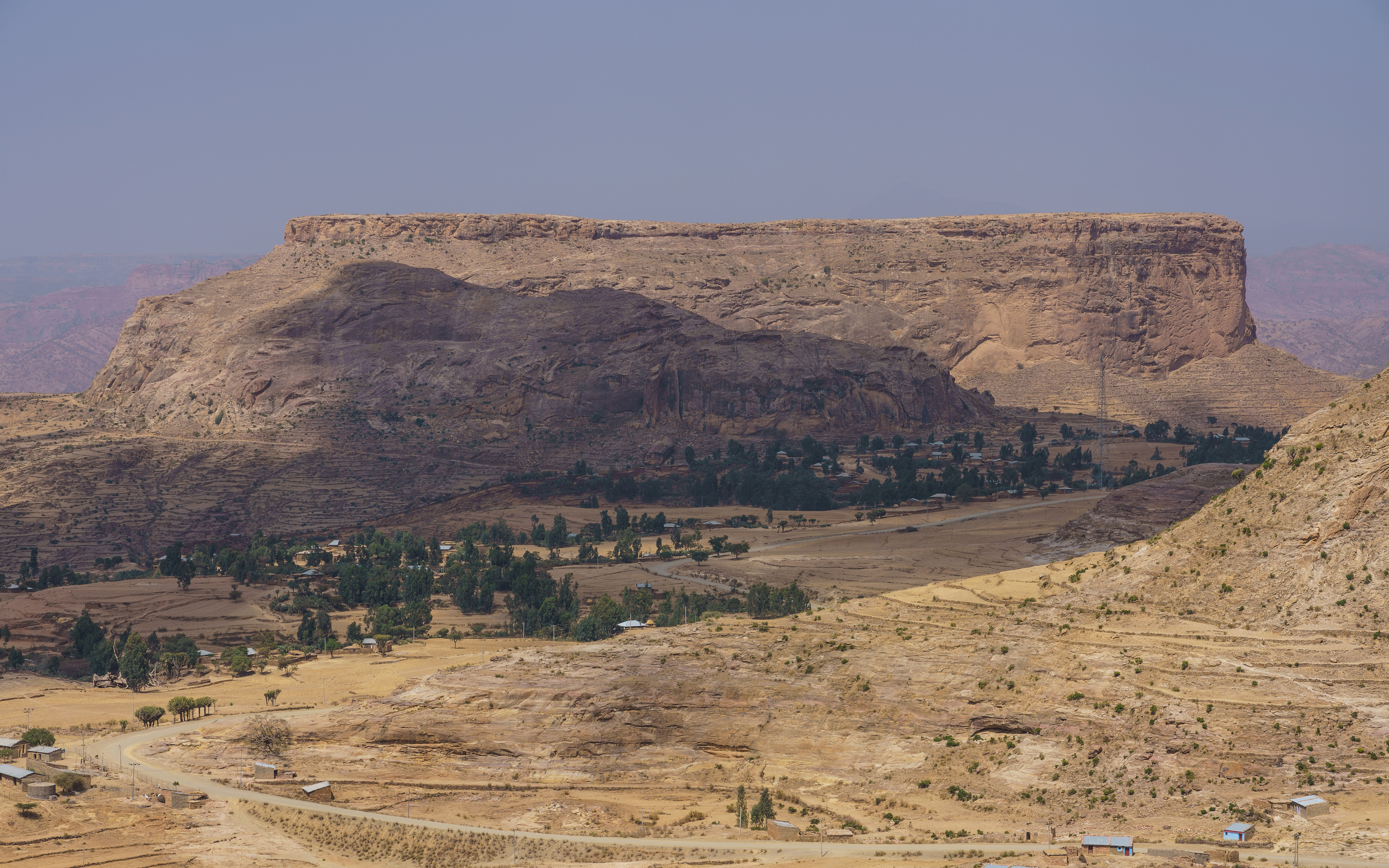
View from the Debre Damo monastery in the Tigray Region of Ethiopia. The international border with Eritrea passes along the mountain.

The Eritrea–Ethiopia border encompasses a roughly 1,033 km (641.9 mi) boundary between the two states. The borders are the Afar and Tigray regions of Ethiopia.

== History ==
=== Creation ===
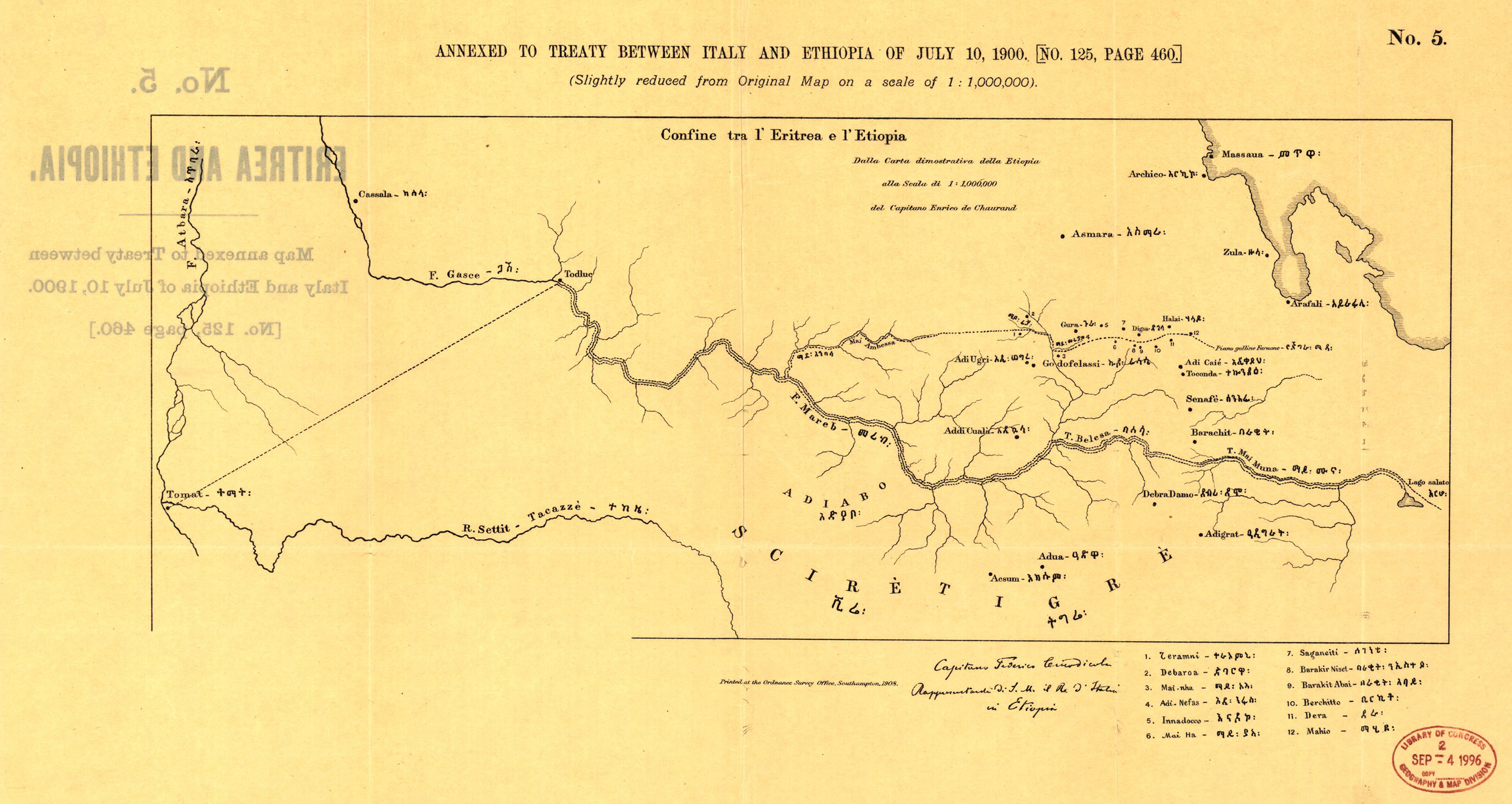
Map of the frontier between Italian Eritrea and the Ethiopian Empire. (1900)

The creation of the modern border of Ethiopia and Eritrea is rooted in the late 19th century, when the Italian shipping company claimed the northern end of Assab Bay in March 1870. The area was settled by the Ottoman Empire and Egypt and the Italians were introduced to the area in 1880. Under Emperor Yohannes IV, the Hewett Treaty was signed between the British Empire and Ethiopia to freely access the Massawa coast to Ethiopia in an exchange to evacuate garrisons from Sudan, during the Mahdist War.

After the death of Yohannes, Italian General Oreste Baratieri occupied the highlands along with the Eritrean coast, and proclaimed Eritrea as one of Italy's colonies. On 2 May 1889, the Treaty of Wuchale was signed between Ethiopia under Emperor Menelik II and Italy that recognized the formation of Italian Eritrea. However, the Article 17 contradicted each version of Amharic and Italian languages, as well as the Italian ambition to incorporate Ethiopia as protectorate of Italy, while the Amharic version granted Ethiopia greater autonomy. This resulted in the First Italo-Ethiopian War, a war in which Ethiopia won against Italian forces, and ended with the Treaty of Addis Ababa in 1896. The Italians took territories beyond the Mareb-Belessa and May/Muni rivers while Menelik absorbed Tigray Province.

=== Cold War ===
After the Italian occupation of Ethiopia and the Second World War, there was considerable dispute about the status of Eritrea. After the Italian communist victory over the 1946 Italian election, they wished it to be returned to Ethiopia and the Soviet Union also had a similar idea, despite fruitless diplomatic efforts. In 1952, the United Nations declared Eritrea to be one of the Ethiopian Provinces under Emperor Haile Selassie, and federated with Ethiopia, resulting in the Eritrean War of Independence among a few armed separatist movements, such as the Eritrean Liberation Front (ELF) formed in 1958. In the 1960s and 1970s, the armed movement of Eritrea continued offensive tactics towards the Ethiopian government until the 1974 coup d'état against Emperor Haile Selassie. In February 1980, the Eritrean People's Liberation Front (EPLF) declared war on the ELF, after which the ELF had a secret negotiation with the Soviet Union.

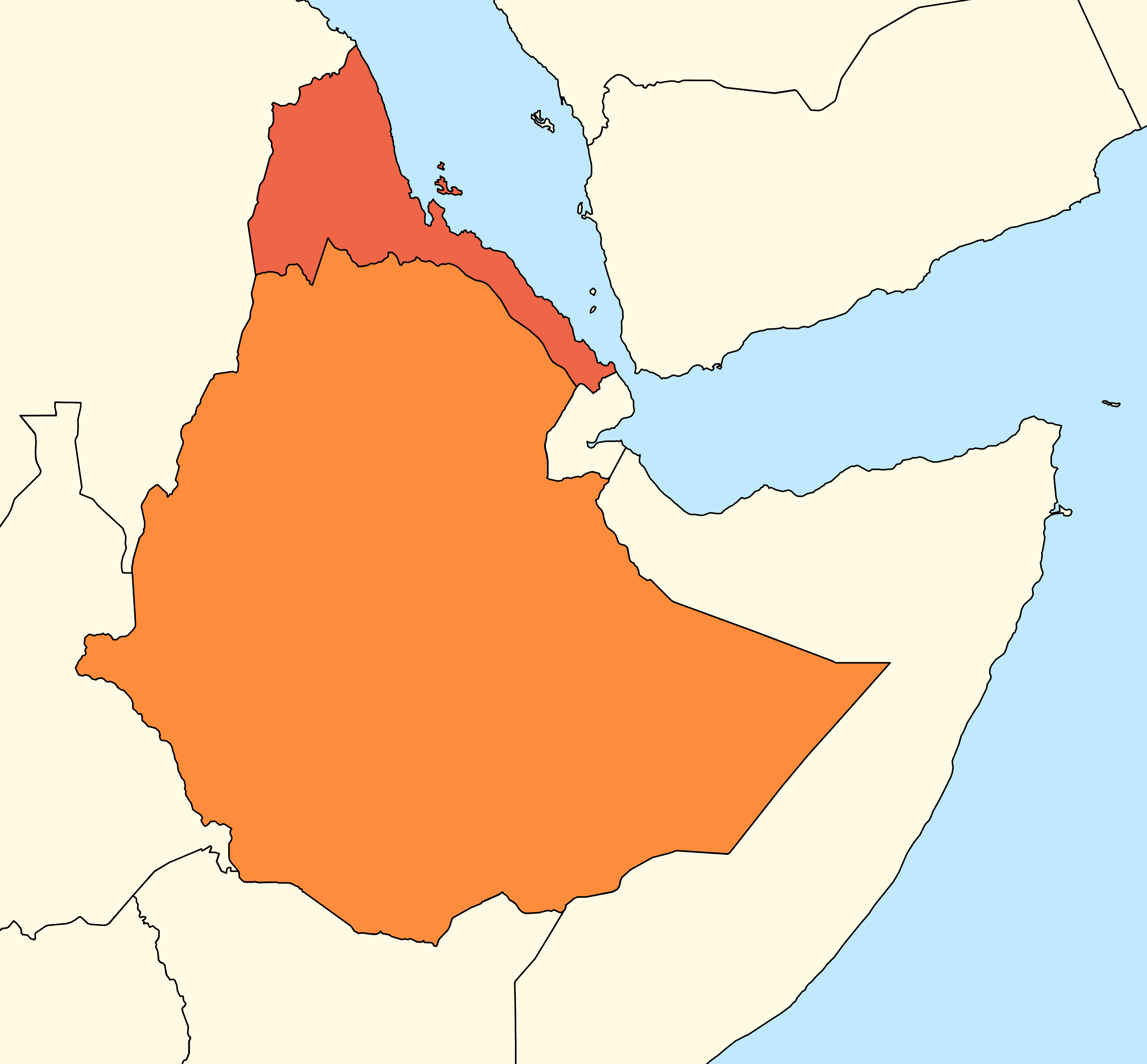
Map of Eritrea and Ethiopia

=== Eritrean–Ethiopian War ===
Under the Ethiopian Transitional Government, Eritrea seceded from Ethiopia following a UN-sponsored referendum in 1993, this resulted in a 99.81% voting for independence. On 4 May 1993, Eritrea was officially recognized as a state. In late 1997, there was a skirmish between their borders. A border conflict was ignited no less than some months between Eritrea and Ethiopia in Badme after the Eritrean mechanized force penetrated the town, and fighting continued between Tigrayan militia and the security police. An Eritrea–Ethiopia Claims Commission was founded to ensure territorial claims under UN Charter Article 51. At the end of the war, Ethiopia occupied about a quarter of Eritrean territory.

Under the premiership of Abiy Ahmed, the two countries restored their relations which led to the 2018 Eritrea–Ethiopia Summit on 9 July. In this summit, Ethiopia stated that Badme would cede to Eritrea and announced the resumption of their diplomatic relations.

== See also ==
- Eritrea–Ethiopia relations
- Geography of Eritrea
- Geography of Ethiopia
