= Second Afar insurgency =

Insurgency in northeastern Ethiopia and southern Eritrea phase from 1995 to 2018

- Part of the Eritrean–Ethiopian border conflict
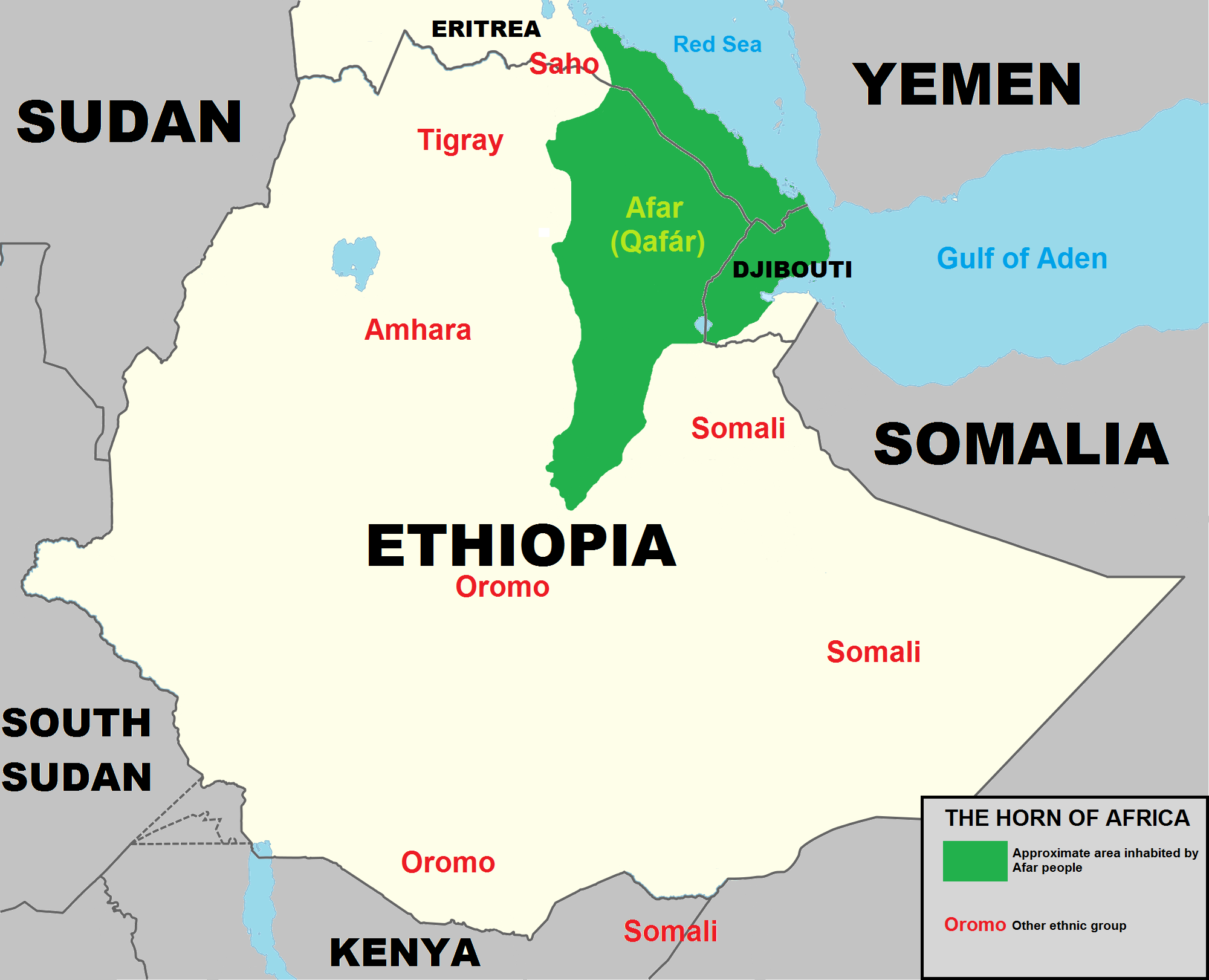
- Map with areas traditionally inhabited by the Afar people highlighted in green.
Date	1995 – 18 July 2018
Location	Afar Region, Ethiopia; Southern Red Sea Region, Eritrea
Status	Eritrean–Ethiopian War ended on 18 June 2000; Eritrean–Ethiopian border conflict ended on 8 July 2018

Belligerents
Ethiopia; Eritrea	ARDUF; RSADO

Commanders and leaders
(Ethiopia) Meles Zenawi (Eritrea) Isaias Afwerki	Mohamuda Gass; Ibrahim Harun

Casualties and losses
- 275–569 killed in total

The Second Afar insurgency was an insurgency in the Afar Region of Ethiopia and the Southern Red Sea Region of Eritrea (also known as Dankalia), waged by various Afar rebel groups. Both Ethiopia and Eritrea supported different rebel groups in the region in a proxy war, and occasionally engaged in border skirmishes with each other, as well as with opposing rebel groups.

== Background ==
The Afar Revolutionary Democratic Unity Front (ARDUF) was founded in 1993, through the merging of three Afar rebel groups, the Afar Revolutionary Democratic Unity Union, the Afar Ummatah Demokrasiyyoh Focca (AUDF), and the Afar Revolutionary Forces (ARF). The three groups were united under the goal of creating an independent state in the Afar Region. The group operates within Ethiopia, allegedly receiving Eritrean support. In 1995, ARDUF perpetrated its first attack, kidnapping an Italian tourist. The victim was later released unharmed.

The Red Sea Afar Democratic Organisation (RSADO) was founded in 1999. Along with the Eritrean National Salvation Front (ENSF), the group operates from bases located in Ethiopia, launching attacks into Eritrean territory. Both groups are allegedly supported by Ethiopia.

== Timeline ==
=== Prior the 2000s ===
- In 1995, ARDUF insurgents kidnapped and later released an Italian tourist.

=== 2000–2009 ===
- In 2002, a splinter faction of ARDUF abandoned the insurgency, and joined the Ethiopian political scene.
- In 2003, ARDUF issued a statement, forbidding foreigners from entering the Afar region.
- In March 2007, ARDUF kidnapped five European tourists and 13 Ethiopians in the Danakil Depression.
- On 16 November 2008, RSADO insurgents claimed to have killed over 285 Eritrean military officers including top military leaders in a military training center, in the remote Dankalia region of the Afambo local area. According to a rebel spokesman, fighters sneaked up to the military base at around 8:30 local time, and bombarded a hall packed with over 450 Eritrean military officers who were celebrating the end of higher military training. The rebel official added that they also hit a truck carrying gas tanker and a generator outside.
- On 26 January 2009, RSADO insurgents reportedly killed 20 soldiers and wounded 30, in the aftermath of an attack on a military camp in the Dankalia region of Eritrea.

=== 2010 ===
- On 1 January 2010, RSADO and the ENSF claimed responsibility for two attacks in Kokobay and Kermeti, Eritrea. 25 Eritrean soldiers were killed and 38 were wounded. The attackers' losses amounted to 10 killed and two captured. According to American and Eritrean intelligence service sources, the attacks were perpetrated by the Ethiopian Armed Forces.
- On 22 April 2010, RSADO and the ENSF launched a coordinated attack on several Eritrean military camps in the south of the country. Both rebel groups announced in a joint statement that they had briefly taken control over the camps and seized weapons and military intelligence. The attack occurred at around 3:00AM local time and rebels were reported to have held it for three more hours until government forces returned with reinforcements. A total of 11 government soldiers were killed and 20 were injured. No rebel casualties were reported. On 28 April, a RSADO spokesman put the army death toll higher at 18 killed and a number of supplies captured during the "surprise" onslaught.

=== 2011–2018 ===
- In March 2011, ARDUF claimed to have killed 49 Ethiopian soldiers.
- In April 2011, the Ethiopian prime minister Meles Zenawi openly declared for the first time that his government will support rebel groups fighting to overthrow president Isaias Afewerki.
- On 22 October 2011, RSADO and ENSF claimed to have killed 12 and wounded 15 Eritrean soldiers, after they launched coordinated attacks on the towns of Kermed, Adi Metras, Ingra Abo and Adi Tela’a.
- On 1 December 2011, the ENSF and RSADO raided an Eritrean military base at dawn in the southern part of the country in Enda Haji, near the town of Tsorona. A RSADO spokesman Yasin Mohamed said his forces held the area until 11:00AM, before they returned to their positions in the safe havens of Ethiopia where the group's headquarters is located. A total of 17 government soldiers were killed, five were injured, and two soldiers were captured by rebel fighters.
- In 2012, RSADO killed 30 Eritrean soldiers in an attack on a military base.
- On 17 January 2012, ARDUF killed five, wounded three, and kidnapped four people, in the aftermath of an attack on the Erta Ale volcano. The majority of the victims were foreign tourists.
- On 15 March 2012, the Ethiopian army carried a cross border raid into Eritrea, destroying three ARDUF camps in Ramid, Gelahbe and Gimbi. An Ethiopian spokesman claimed that the rebels were receiving Eritrean training.
- On 7 September 2013, RSADO and the Saho People's Democratic Movement (SPDM) formed an alliance in order to jointly combat the Eritrean government.
- On 29 April 2014, RSADO claimed to have killed 27 Eritrean intelligence agents, in the aftermath of an attack on military camp.
- On 22 December 2014, RSADO and the Democratic Front for Eritrean Unity (DFEU) claimed joint responsibility for an attack on a military camp located in Adi-Kala, allegedly killing 7 intelligence officers.
- In July 2015, clashes between a newly formed armed group and the Ethiopian army left 50 reported killed on 2 July and 30 killed in the counter-attacks on 10 July.
- The Eritrean–Ethiopian border conflict is officially ended on 8 July 2018 with a signed "joint declaration of peace and friendship".
- Following the peace agreement, on 18 July 2018, after twenty years Ethiopian Airlines restarted its operations to Eritrea. Flight ET0312 left Bole International Airport to Asmara.

== See also ==
- First Afar insurgency (Djiboutian Civil War)
- Ethiopian Civil War
- Eritrean War of Independence
- Eritrean–Ethiopian War
- 2013 Eritrean Army mutiny
