= KPF =

KPF may stand for:

- Kohn Pedersen Fox, an American architectural firm
- Kefagn Patriotic Front, an Ethiopian political faction
- Khost Protection Force
