= Battle of Tsorona =

2016 Eritrea–Ethiopia border skirmish

Coordinates: 15°N 39°E

- Part of Eritrean–Ethiopian border conflict
Date	12–13 June 2016 (1 day)
Location	Tsorona, Eritrea
Result	Both sides claim victory
Territorial changes	No territorial changes

Belligerents
Eritrea	Ethiopia

Commanders and leaders
Isaias Afewerki; Sebhat Ephrem	Mulatu Teshome; Siraj Fergessa

Casualties and losses
18 killed (Eritrean claim); Higher than the Ethiopian losses (Ethiopian claim)	Lighter than Eritrean losses (Ethiopian claim); 200+ killed, 300+ wounded (Eritrean claim)

The Battle of Tsorona was an engagement between the Eritrean and the Ethiopian armies on the border near the town of Tsorona.

== Background ==
Following the Eritrean–Ethiopian War which lasted from 1998 to 2000, Eritrea–Ethiopia relations had remained tense, with multiple small border skirmishes occurring as a part of the wider Eritrean–Ethiopian border conflict. The 2016 engagement, which utilized "medium- and long-range artillery" was seen as a more serious altercation.

== Battle ==
=== Eritrean claims ===
According to the Eritrean Information Ministry, Ethiopian forces attacked Eritrean troops at Tsorona on Sunday, June 12, 2016. After an overnight battle, the troops were repelled on Monday, June 13, 2016. Ethiopian forces quickly withdrew back over the border, with Eritrea estimating Ethiopian losses at 200 dead and 300 wounded. Eritrea claimed 18 fatalities on its own side during the battle. Eritrea identified Ethiopian armed forces as the aggressors and accused the Ethiopian government of using a smokescreen of propaganda to justify the attack.

=== Ethiopian claims ===
Ethiopian government spokesman Getachew Reda initially denied any knowledge of clashes between Eritrea and Ethiopia. Subsequent comments by the Ethiopian government spokesman claimed "there were significant casualties on both sides, but more on the Eritrean side." The Ethiopian government also claimed Eritrea instigated the clash to “distract attention” from the recently published report on Eritrea by the United Nations Commission of Inquiry (COI) on human rights in Eritrea.

=== Media claims ===
The exile-based news source Gedab News, or Awate, reported on June 12 that border clashes were ongoing, but that the trigger remained unclear. The next day they reported that the clash was triggered by a firefight between Eritrean soldiers and Eritrean opposition groups based in Ethiopia. The clash escalated as an increasing number of Ethiopian and Eritrean troops joined the altercation. They offer the following timeline.

== Timeline ==
Around midnight on Saturday June 11, a group of Eritrean National Service members, crossed the border to Ethiopia near Tsorona. On the Ethiopian side of the border, there are several armed Eritrean opposition groups; Eritrean Defense Forces soldiers shot at the deserters and Eritrean opposition groups shot back, resulting in a firefight.

This lasted for several hours during which the Eritrean Defense Forces used mortars and RPGs;

By 5:00 am, the Eritrean opposition groups had retreated as troops from the Ethiopian National Defense Forces arrived from the surrounding area;

The fighting continued until mid-afternoon Monday(June 13), during which the EDF and ENDF exchanged heavy artillery fire.

== Conflicting narratives ==
While both governments blamed each other for initiating the clash, neither side provided details about its escalation. Awate reporters claim that this omission is in the interests of both nations. The Ethiopian government's initial statement denying the “clashes” likely resulted from its hesitance to draw attention to its hosting of armed Eritrean opposition groups. As for the Eritrean government, it does not acknowledge engaging with Eritrean opposition groups, as it does not recognize any Eritrean opposition groups.
