= Flags and emblems of the regions of Ethiopia =

Ethiopia is currently divided into twelve regions and two chartered cities. Each region or chartered city has its own flag and emblem.

== Regional flags ==
Flag	Date	Use	Description
		Flag of Addis Ababa	
	2012	Flag of the Afar Region	The flag has a red triangle at the hoist with three horizontal stripes of blue, white and green in the fly. The regional emblem is placed in the centre of the white stripe.
		Flag of the Amhara Region	The flag of Amhara is golden with a broad red diagonal across the center, charged with a golden star in the center.
		Flag of the Benishangul-Gumuz Region	The flag of Benishangul/Gamuz is a horizontal tricolour of black, gold and green with a red triangle based at the hoist.
	2023	Flag of Central Ethiopia Regional State	
		Flag of Dire Dawa	
		Flag of the Gambela Region	
		Flag of the Harari Region	
		Flag of the Oromia Region	
	2023	Flag of the Sidama Region	
		Flag of the Somali Region	
	2023	Flag of South Ethiopia Regional State	The flag of South Ethiopia Regional State is a horizontal tricolour of green, water blue and red with a yellow triangle based at the hoist. And narrow sized black colo separates all colors.
	2023	Flag of the South West Ethiopia Peoples' Region	
		Flag of the Tigray Region	

== Regional emblems ==
Addis Ababa

Afar Region

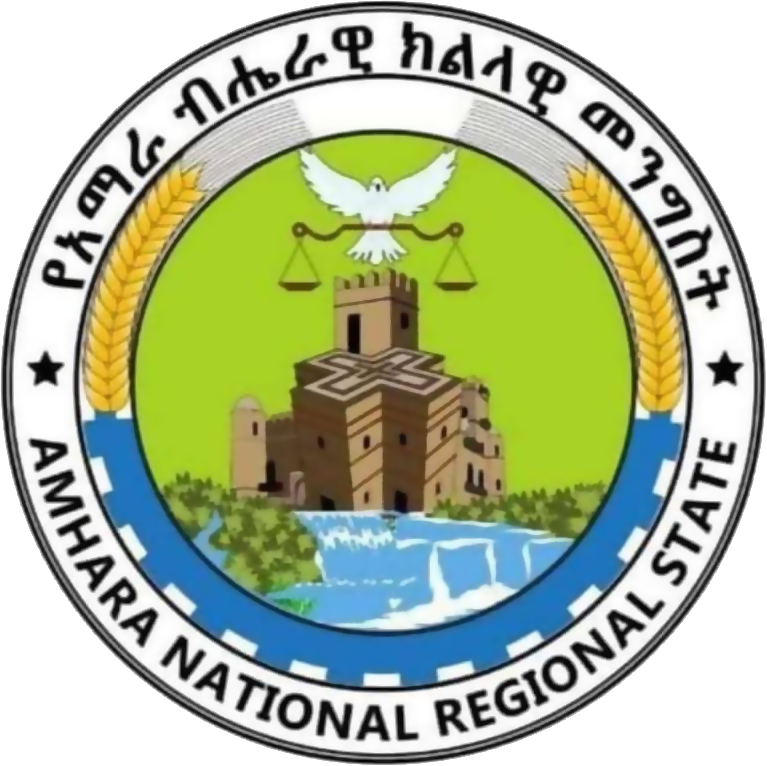
Amhara Region

Benishangul-Gumuz Region

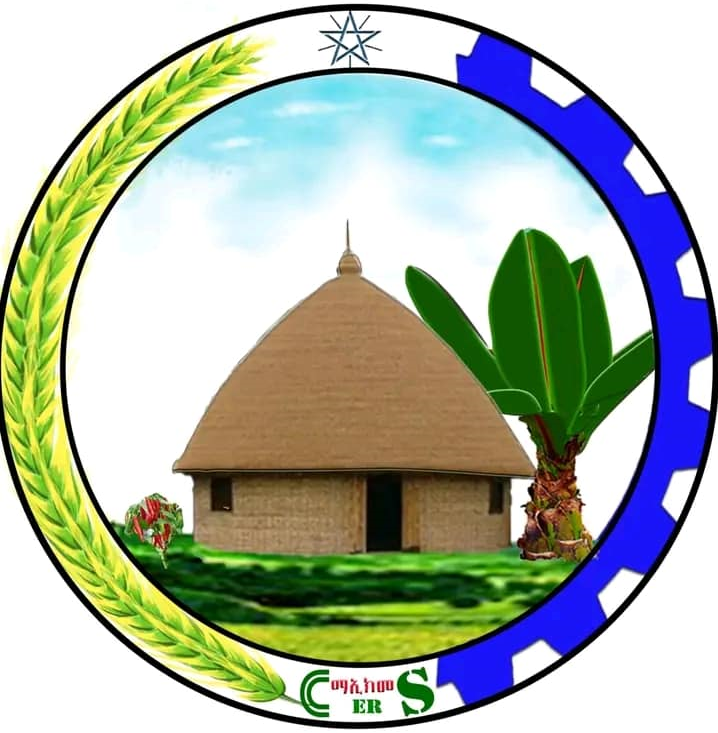
Central Ethiopia Regional State

Dire Dawa

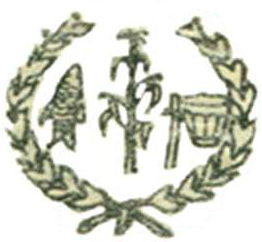
Gambela Region

Harari Region

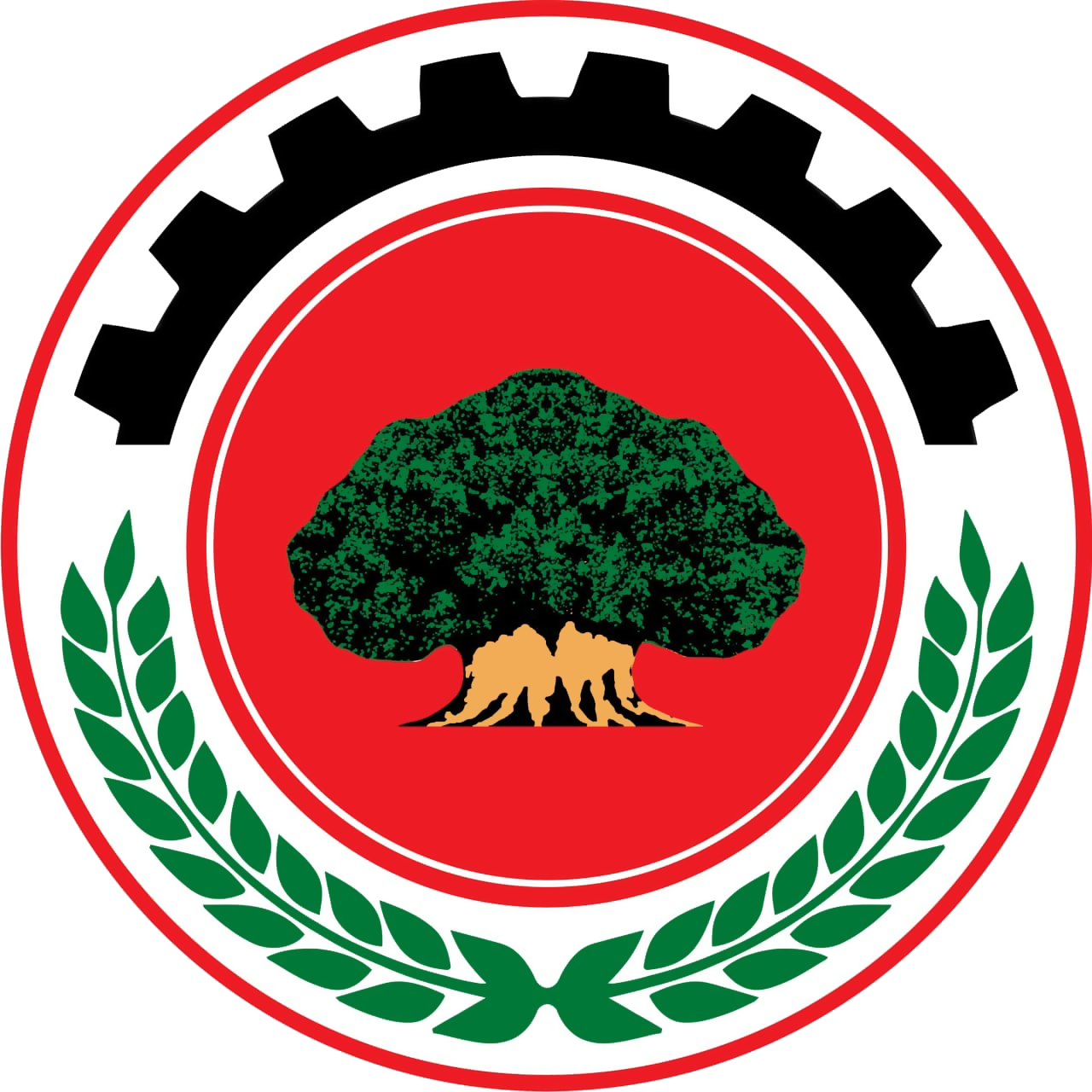
Oromia Region

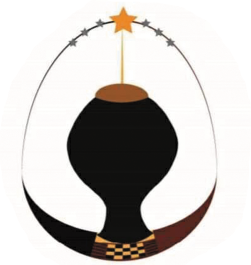
Sidama Region

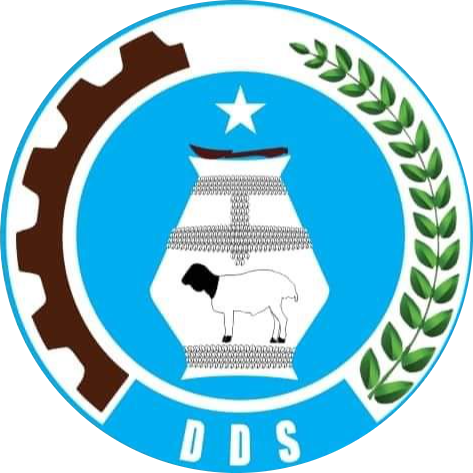
Somali Region

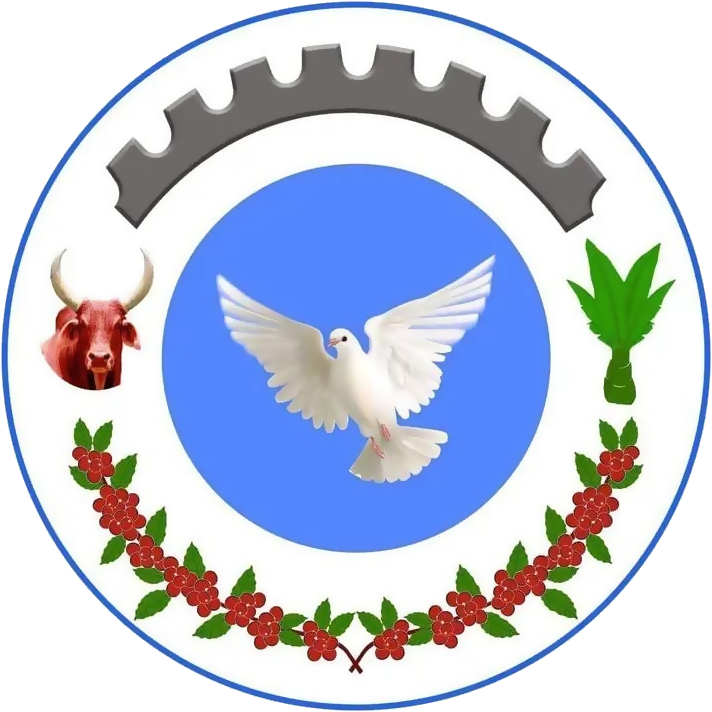
South Ethiopia Regional State

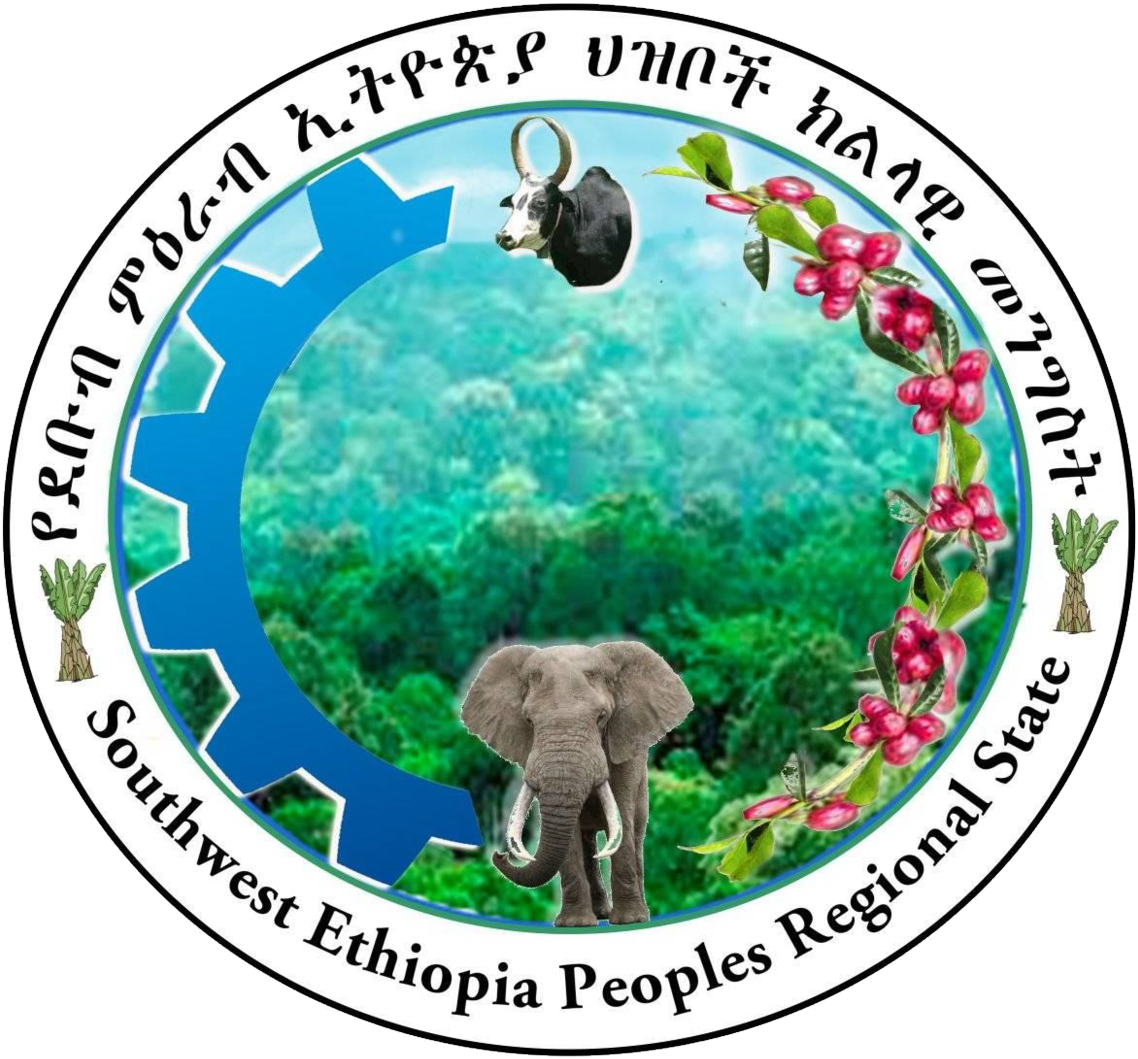
South West Ethiopia Peoples' Region

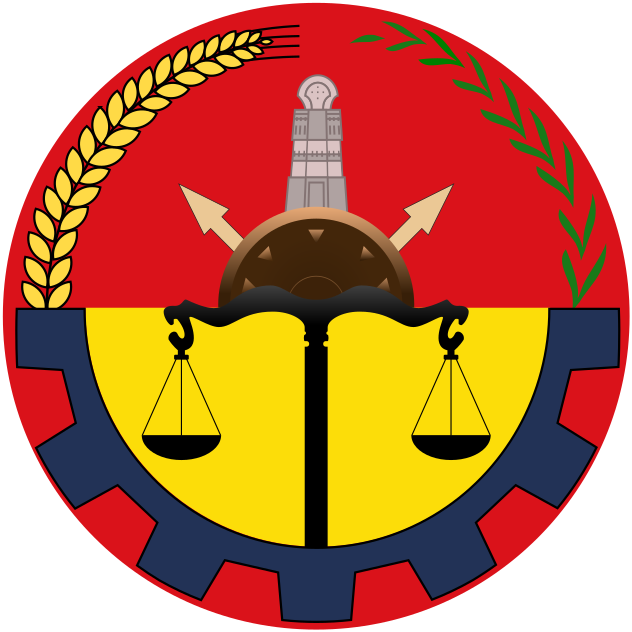
Tigray Region

== Former regions ==
Flag of the Southern Nations, Nationalities, and Peoples' Region (1992–2023)

Emblem of the Southern Nations, Nationalities, and Peoples' Region (1992–2023)

== See also ==
- Flag of Ethiopia
- Emblem of Ethiopia
- Regions of Ethiopia
- Regional flag
