= Flag of Ethiopia =

Federal Democratic Republic of Ethiopia
- Use: National flag and ensign
- Proportion: 1:2
- Adopted: 11 October 1897; 129 years ago (original version); 31 October 1996; 30 years ago (current version); 16 May 2009; 17 years ago (modified version)
- Design: A horizontal tricolour of green, yellow and red with the National Emblem superimposed at the center.
- Designed by: Meles Zenawi

The flag of Ethiopia (Amharic: የኢትዮጵያ ሰንደቅ ዐላማ) consists of a green, yellow, and red tricolour with the national emblem, a golden pentagram on a blue disc, superimposed at the centre. While the colours green, yellow, and red in combination held symbolic importance since at least the early 17th century, the modern tricolour was first adopted on 11 October 1897 by Menelik II, and the present flag on 31 October 1996.

== Colors ==
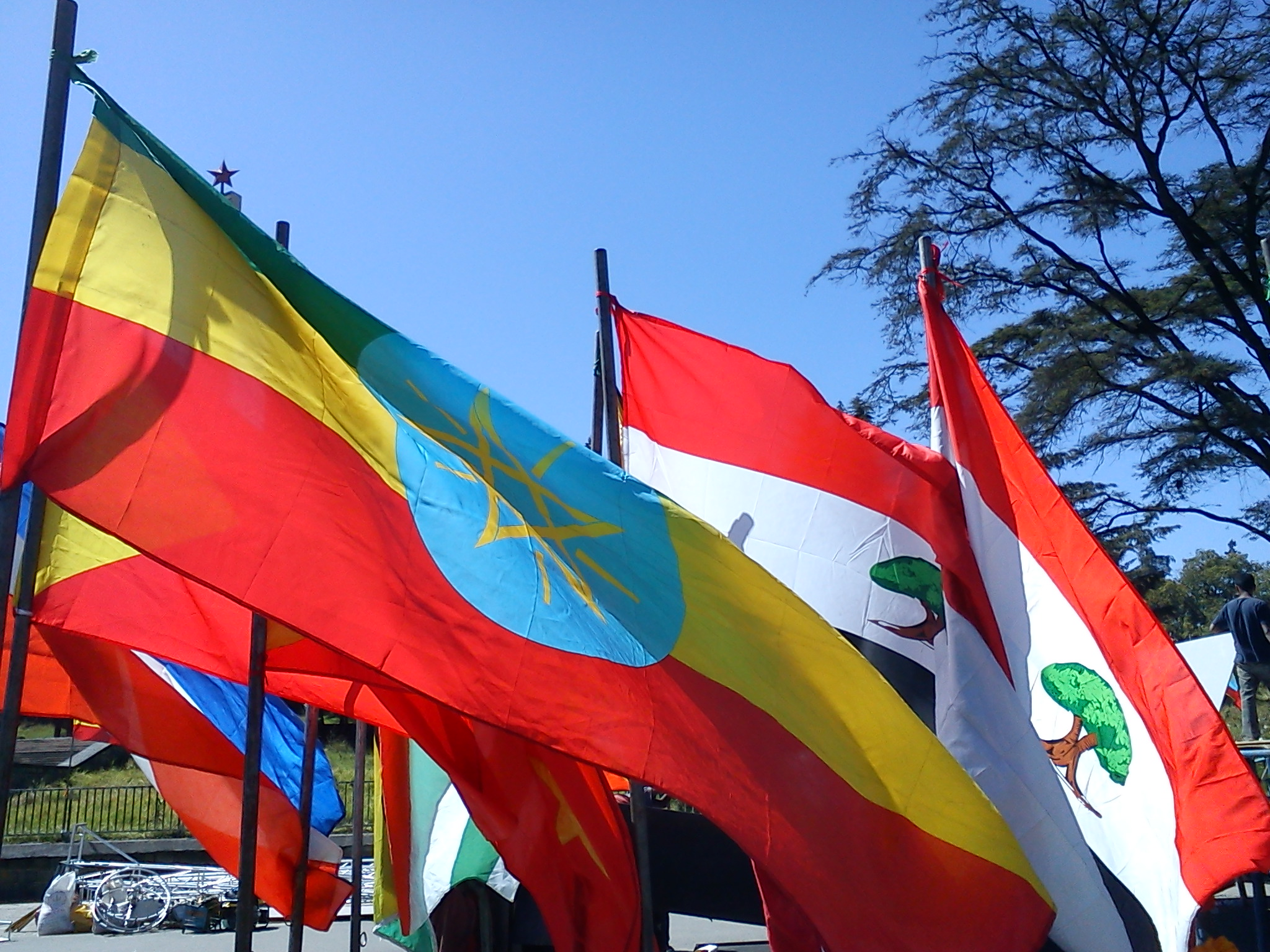
Ethiopia's national and regional flags

The colors of blue, yellow and red were used for the flag of the Ethiopian Empire in 1914. On 11 October 1897, a year after Ethiopia decisively defeated the Kingdom of Italy at the Battle of Adwa, emperor Menelik II ordered the three pennants combined in a rectangular tricolour from top to bottom of red, yellow, and green with the first letter of his own name (the Amharic letter "ም") on the central stripe. The letter of Menelik's name was removed from the flag after his death in 1913. For unknown reasons, the colour order was flipped—with green on top, red on the bottom, and the yellow remaining in place. The flag's tricolour scheme has existed since the early 19th century, and the colours red, yellow, and green carried special importance prior to that. To commemorate its adoption in 1897, Ethiopia celebrates Flag Day on the first Monday of the month of Tikimt (September–October).

The royal flag often featured the emblem of a Lion of Judah, a crowned lion carrying a cross centered in the banner's yellow midsection. Along with that, the symbols of Ethiopia in the Middle Ages were the war drums and red umbrellas carried by the Atse's retinue and the original sandak alama (ሰንደቅ ዐላማ), a golden globus cruciger fixed upon a metal pole with silk wrapped underneath resembling the ancient Roman Aquila and Mongol-Turkic tug. The flag is understood to be a link between the Ethiopian Orthodox Tewahedo Church, the peoples, and the nation that was united. The processional cross carried by the lion was the former flag or symbol of Ethiopia, and has likewise been in use since at least the early 17th century. Whilst red is currently featured at the bottom of the horizontal tricolour, it was on top until the year 1914. What the colors symbolise varies depending on point of view. However, generally, red represents the blood spilled in defense of Ethiopia; yellow represents peace and harmony between Ethiopia's various ethnic and religious groups; and green is said to symbolise hope, or the land and its fertility. The colors had historically been used by the Ethiopian Orthodox Church (red for faith and power, yellow for the church & peace, and green for natural wealth) prior to their adoption as the colors of the state, likely due to them being easy to produce and common in the Ethiopian landscape. Two French travelers in the 19th century, Ferret and Joseph Galinier, said "red, green, and yellow are the main colours of manuscript illuminations."

Upon gaining independence from colonial rule, several newly-established countries in Africa adopted these three colors in homage to Ethiopia's resistance against foreign occupation. When adopted by Pan-Africanist polities and organisations for their activities, the colours are often referred to as the Pan-African colours.

The civil flag of Ethiopia until it was outlawed by the ruling coalition EPRDF in 2009. Used by diaspora at community events, by some government opposition groups, during Ethiopian Orthodox Christian holidays, and by transitional governments.

=== Flag Design Symbolism ===
- Green represents development.
  Pantone 347C
- Yellow represents hope.
  Pantone Yellow C
- Red represents the blood in defense of Ethiopia.
  Pantone 032C
- Blue the circular blue background of the Emblem signifies peace.
  Pantone 2728

== Emblem ==
Prior to 1996, the plain green, yellow and red banner was commonly used as a civil flag. Although a number of different emblems were used by the government since 1974, flags with emblems were uncommonly used in public outside of government usage. The basic colour schematic has remained constant.

The star is yellow on a blue disc which overlaps the green and red stripes. The star testifies to Ethiopia's bright future, while the yellow rays which it emits are equidistant and are said to represent the equality of all Ethiopians regardless of race, creed, or sex. In recent years, the government of Ethiopia has taken a conscious effort to increase the usage of the flag with the emblem, which had been seen far less than the plain tricolour. As the plain tricolour was used and seen far more often than either the flag of the Derg or the Lion of Judah flag, this was considered unusual.

In 2009, the Parliament of Ethiopia passed Proclamation 654/2009 (The Federal Flag Proclamation), which prohibited firstly amongst 23 other provisions "use [of] the Flag without its Emblem", as well as "to deface the Flag by writing or displaying signs, [sic] symbols, emblems or picture [sic]", or "to prepare or use the Flag without the proper order of its colors and size or its Emblem." While most offenses were punishable by a fine of "3000 birr or rigorous imprisonment up to one year", the first offense, mandating the usage of the emblem, received an increased penalty of "5000 birr or rigorous imprisonment up to one year and six months." This replaced the 1996 Flag Proclamation, which had made no mention of offenses or penalties.

== Historical flags ==
Pennants of the Ethiopian Empire (1270–1897). The traditional colours were displayed on war flags and by the church prior to the first official state flag.

Flag of Ethiopia (1897–1914). Menelik II, on 6 October 1897, ordered for a rectangular tricolour consisting of, from top to bottom, red, yellow, and green, with ም, the first Amharic letter of his name in the middle, which lasted until his death.

Flag of the Ethiopian Empire with the Lion of Judah (a symbol of the Solomonic dynasty dating back to medieval times), otherwise known as the imperial flag (1897, 1914–1936, 1941–1974). It remains popular with the Rastafari movement, monarchists, and Ethiopian nationalists.

Blank tricolor of the Ethiopian Empire which was flown alongside the imperial flag after the reign of Menelik. In tradition, the reversed colors are said to have first been used, exclusively, during times of war, but the reason behind the design change is unknown.

War Ensign of the Imperial Ethiopian Navy (1955–1974), was based upon the Blue Ensign.

Flag of Ethiopia (1974–1975), modified after Haile Selassie's overthrow by removing the crown from the lion's head and by changing the cross tip to a spear point

War Ensign of the Imperial Ethiopian Navy (1974–1975)

Civil flag of Ethiopia (1975–1987)

State flag under the Derg (1975–1987), and a forerunner to the flag introduced in 1987

The flag of the People's Democratic Republic of Ethiopia (1987–1991) introduced the current ratio of 1:2.

The civil flag of the Transitional Government of Ethiopia (1991–1996)

The state flag of the Transitional Government of Ethiopia, adopted on 28 May 1992

The flag of the Federal Democratic Republic of Ethiopia from 1996 to 2009

The flag of the Federal Democratic Republic of Ethiopia from 1996 to 2009 (variant)

The current flag, used since 2009

== See also ==
- Emblem of Ethiopia
- National anthem of Ethiopia
- List of Ethiopian flags
- Flags and emblems of the regions of Ethiopia
- Pan-African colours
- Flag of Bolivia
