= Democratic Movement for the Liberation of the Eritrean Kunama =

Rebel group in Eritrea

- Flag of the Kunama people, used by the DMLEK
- Headquarters: Afar Region, Ethiopia
- Active regions: Southern Red Sea Region, Eritrea
- Ideology: Kunama self-determination
- Part of: Eritrean Democratic Alliance
- Wars: the Second Afar insurgency

The Democratic Movement for the Liberation of the Eritrean Kunama (abbreviated DMLEK) is a Kunama political and armed organization active in Eritrea. That advocates for the rights and autonomy of the Kunama people, one of the nine ethnic groups in the country. The group is mainly funded by Eritrean diaspora and is allied with the Red Sea Afar Democratic Organisation.

The DMLEK was founded in April 1, 1995, after Eritrea gained independence from Ethiopia. The organization emerged in response to the marginalization and discrimination faced by the Kunama people under the Eritrean government. The DMLEK has been involved in armed conflict with the Eritrean government, with the aim of securing greater autonomy, independence and representation for the Kunama people. However the DMLEK's stance on separatism is somewhat ambiguous, with some members advocating for independence for the Kunama region through conflict.

The Kunama people have a distinct culture and language, and have historically faced discrimination and marginalization under successive Eritrean governments. The DMLEK has been critical of the Eritrean government's policies towards minority groups, and has called for greater respect for the rights of the Kunama people and other marginalized communities in the country.

The DMLEK has been involved in various armed conflicts with the Eritrean government, and has been accused of committing human rights abuses. The organization has been designated a terrorist group by the Eritrean government, and has been subject to repression and crackdowns.
