= Emblem of Ethiopia =

Emblem of the Federal Democratic Republic of Ethiopia

- Armiger: Federal Democratic Republic of Ethiopia
- Adopted: 1996 (modified 16 May 2009)
- Shield: Azure, a pentagram with five rays of light or.

The emblem of Ethiopia has been in its current form since 1996. It contains a yellow interlaced pentagram radiating rays of light on a blue circle. Today, the pentagram stands for the unity of the people and nationality of the Federal Democratic Republic of Ethiopia. The emblem appears in the centre of the flag of Ethiopia.

Prior to 1975, the coat of arms of the Ethiopian Empire was used.

In 1975, an earlier version of the emblem of Ethiopia was adopted, consisting of a plow on a yellow sunburst surrounded by a wreath. It was used until 1987 and eventually became associated with the Derg regime.

Colours scheme

| | Blue | Yellow |
|---|---|---|
| RGB | 15/71/175 | 252/221/9 |
| Hexadecimal | #0f47af | #fcdd09 |
| CMYK | 91/59/0/31 | 0/12/96/1 |

== History ==
Medieval European depiction of the symbol of Ethiopia, a lion holding a patriarchal cross

Coat of arms of the Ethiopian Empire (Menelik II)

Coat of arms of the Ethiopian Empire (Haile Selassie)

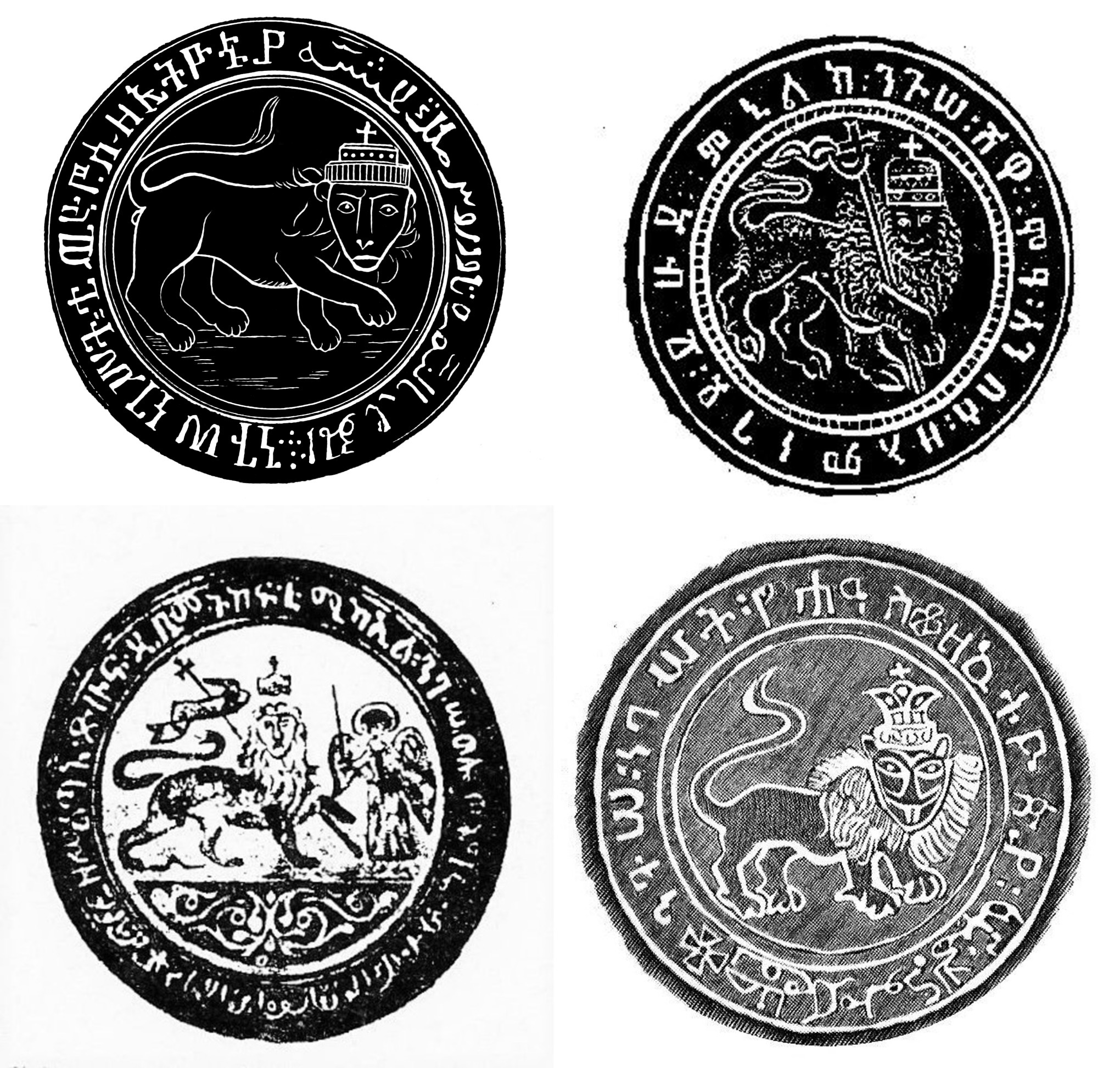
The seals of multiple members of the Ethiopian nobility during the 19th and early 20th centuries

Conquering Lion of Judah (1897–1974)

Conquering Lion of Judah modified after Haile Selassie's overthrow by removing the crown from the lion's head and by changing the cross tip to a spear point (1974–75)

Emblem of the Provisional Military Government of Socialist Ethiopia (1975–87)

State emblem of the People's Democratic Republic of Ethiopia (1987–91)

Emblem of the Transitional Government of Ethiopia (1991–95)

Emblem of Ethiopia (1996–2009, lighter shade of blue than the current one)

== See also ==
- Flag of Ethiopia
- Flags and emblems of the regions of Ethiopia
