= Democratic Front for Eritrean Unity =

Rebel group in Eritrea

- Logo of the Democratic Front for Eritrean Unity
- Headquarters: Afar Region, Ethiopia
- Active regions: Southern Red Sea Region, Eritrea
- Wars: the Second Afar insurgency

The Democratic Front for Eritrean Unity (DFEU) is a rebel group currently fighting the Eritrean government. They are allied with the Red Sea Afar Democratic Organisation (RSADO), with whom they have done joint operations.
