= Awate =

US-based Eritrean news website

- Website type: News
- Founded: September 2000
- Headquarters: United States
- Creator: Saleh Gadi
- Founder: Saleh Gadi
- Editor: Saleh Gadi
- Website: awate.com
- Launched: September 2000; 26 years ago
- Current status: Active

Awate or awate.com is a United States–based Eritrean news website.

== Creation ==
Awate was created by Saleh Gadi as an Eritrean news website, in September 2000, several years after the 1997 creation of Asmarino, another Eritrean diaspora news website. Saleh lived in Kuwait for several years through to 2001, and published reports critical of the Eritrean government's decision to attack Ethiopia, which started the Eritrean–Ethiopian War. Saleh's passport was cancelled and he received political asylum in the United States (US). Saleh created Awate after his arrival in the US, with aim of providing an alternative to what he described as Eritrean government "infiltrat[ion] [of] every community in the world [with] networks of supporters everywhere who threaten people and, either directly or through relatives back home, punish them for speaking out". Awate named itself after Hamid Idris Awate for his "fighting against overwhelming odds and standing up for what is right no matter how long it may take".

== Leadership ==
Saleh Gadi, founder of Awate, continued as its editor as of 2012.

== Points of view ==
The content of Awate tends to be critical of the Eritrean government, playing a "counterpart to the Eritrean state".
