= Treaty of Addis Ababa =

1896 treaty formally ending the First Italo-Ethiopian War

Treaty of Addis Abba
- Context: First Italo-Ethiopian War
- Signed: October 23, 1896
- Location: Addis Ababa
- Condition: Peace between the Kingdom of Italy and the Ethiopian Empire; Abrogation of the Treaty of Wuchale
- Parties: Kingdom of Italy Ethiopian Empire

The Treaty of Addis Ababa, signed on 26 October 1896, formally ended the First Italo-Ethiopian War on terms mostly favourable to Ethiopia. This treaty superseded a secret agreement between Ethiopia and Italy negotiated days after the decisive Battle of Adwa in March of the same year, in which Ethiopian forces commanded by Menelik II defeated the Italians. The most important concession the Italians made was the abrogation of the Treaty of Wuchale and recognizing Ethiopia as an independent country.

Following the conclusion of this treaty and before the end of the next calendar year, the United Kingdom and France, which had colonial possessions bordering Ethiopia, also concluded treaties with Ethiopia which treated her as an equal. The treaty with France was signed in late January 1897, while the treaty with the United Kingdom was signed on 14 May 1897.

== Negotiating the treaty ==
In the Italian text of the Treaty of Wuchale, Ethiopia was obliged to conduct all foreign affairs through Italy, which effectively made Ethiopia an Italian protectorate, while the Amharic version merely gave Ethiopia the option of communicating with third powers through the Italian government. Learning of this divergence from the Amharic text, Emperor Menelik believed he had been deceived by the Italians; this had led to the war between the two countries. Moreover, the Italians had been carefully encroaching on Ethiopian territory over the months between the signing of that treaty in 1889 and when hostilities began in 1895.

On the other hand, his victory at Adwa resulted in Menelik being in possession of 3,000 Italian soldiers, as well as a large victorious army facing the demoralized remnants of the Italian military in Eritrea, the latter fearing they would be driven into the sea at any moment. Further, when news of the defeat reached Italy, Prime Minister Francesco Crispi was forced to resign. Ethiopian Emperor Menelik was negotiating from a position of strength.

The initial Italian offer, presented by Major Tomasso Salsa on 11 March, offered Menelik Italy's abrogation of the Treaty of Wuchale and a new treaty of peace and friendship, but in return, he remained "firm in his aim of not accepting the protectorate of any other power". Menelik had gone to war to maintain his Empire's independence, not to exchange one master for another; according to historian Harold G. Marcus, Menelik was so enraged at this offer that he demanded the return of their secret truce, saying he would hold Major Salsa hostage until then.

It was not until 23 August that the Italians finally agreed to the unconditional abrogation of the Treaty of Wuchale, and recognition of the sovereign independence of Ethiopia. Once the Italians had conceded on this point, negotiations proceeded quickly. The Italian prisoners-of-war, who had enjoyed "reasonably benign captivity" (Marcus' words), would be repatriated, and Italy pay an indemnity of 10,000,000 Italian liras for their upkeep. Most surprisingly, the Italians would retain most, if not all, of the territories beyond the Mareb-Belessa and May/Muni rivers they had taken; according to Abyssinian Monarchists' Menelik gave away a sizable portion of Tigray which had been treated as part of the Ethiopian empire since time immemorial.

The border between Ethiopia proper and Eritrea was further defined in a series of agreements in 1900, 1902, and 1908.
