= Saho People's Democratic Movement =

- Dates active: 2009–2019
- Headquarters: Adigrat, Ethiopia
- Active regions: Southern Red Sea Region, Eritrea
- Ideology: Saho self-determination
- Wars: Second Afar insurgency

The Saho People's Democratic Movement (SPDM) was an organized group in Eritrea, fighting for the self-determination of the Saho people. They are allied with the Red Sea Afar Democratic Organisation (RSADO), whom they have done joint operations with. The organization was founded in 2009 by Saho exiles.

In 2007, a group of Eritrean conscripts belonging to the Saho ethnicity fled to Ethiopia to organize themselves against the Eritrean regime. By April 2009, the SPDM was officially formed. That same year, a group of 70 Eritrean soldiers mutinied and clashed with the Eritrean army in the mountains around Senafe and Adi Keyh, the rebellion was crushed but many of them escaped into Ethiopia where they joined the SPDM.

The SPDM advocated for greater representation of the Saho people in the government of Eritrea, as well as for the recognition of Saho as an official language in Eritrea. The organization also demanded an end to the forced conscription of young men into the EPLF, and for greater democracy and human rights in the country.

The SPDM has been critical of the government of President Isaias Afwerki, accusing it of being undemocratic and repressive. The party has also expressed concern over the government's handling of the border dispute with Ethiopia, which has led to a protracted conflict between the two countries. While the SPDM's official position is that it seeks a peaceful and democratic resolution to the conflict between the Saho people and the Eritrean government, some members of the party have expressed support for greater autonomy or even independence for the Saho region. The Saho people have historically faced marginalization and discrimination, and the SPDM has been a vocal advocate for their rights and interests.

On August 10, 2017, seven major leaders of the SPDM was arrested by the Ethiopian security forces at their headquarters in Adigrat including five members of the executive Committee, a member of the central committee, and a regular member.

As of 2019, the movement was defunct and claimed no attacks since 2013.
