= Kefagn Patriotic Front =

Political faction in Ethiopia (1970s–1996)

- Leader: General Haile Meles
- Dates active: 1970s–1996
- Wars: Ethiopian Civil War

Kefagn Patriotic Front (KPF) is a political faction in Ethiopia. KPF emerged from a group of soldiers in the army of the regime of Mengistu Haile Mariam who refused to serve in the Eritrean War.

Originally known simply as "Kefagn", KPF was created to combat the incursions of the Tigray People's Liberation Front into Gondar Province. With the fall of the Mengistu regime this group declined in strength but was not eliminated. John Young recounts that in May 1993 he encountered government soldiers on the western shores of Lake Tana who had been wounded in clashes with dissidents in the area. He was told that these rebels were led by General Haile Meles, a former Derg official.

Later in 1993, General Haile was wounded, and evacuated to Sudan, where government officials protected him and refused Ethiopian demands for his extradition. He continued to be a source of controversy in Sudanese–Ethiopian relations until he was granted asylum in New Zealand in late 1999. By the time he left Sudan, the KPF was in disarray, although the transfer of most of the area west of Lake Tana to the Benishangul-Gumuz Region, served to reactivate the group. Since then the Kefagn, which had since renamed itself as the Kefagn Patriotic Front, has received some assistance from the Sudan Armed Forces.

In 1996, the majority of the KPF, based amongst guerrillas in Sudan and Ethiopia, joined the Ethiopian Unity Front. The minority, based in the United States, stayed out of EUF.
