= Ibrahim Harun =

Ethiopian politician (born 1974)

2nd

Chairman of RSADO
- Incumbent
- Assumed office April 2001
- Preceded by: Ali Osman Ma'ar

Vice Chairman of RSADO
- In office January 1999 – April 2001
- Preceded by: Position established
- Succeeded by: Mohamed Ahmed Shina

Personal details
- Born: 1974 (age 51–52) T'í'o, Ethiopian Empire
- Party: Red Sea Afar Democratic Organisation
- Education: Ethiopian Civil Service University
- Profession: Politician

Ibrahim Harun (born 1974) is the current chairman of the Red Sea Afar Democratic Organisation (RSADO) and was the First Vice Chairman of the organisation, from 1999 to 2001.

== Founding RSADO ==
Harun became a part of the struggle in 1999, when he abandoned his economics studies in Addis Ababa and left for Abala, Ethiopian Afar Regional State, joining the first conference of the Red Sea Afar People to establish the Red Sea Afar Democratic Organisation (RSADO). In the conference, he was elected vice chairman of the RSADO.

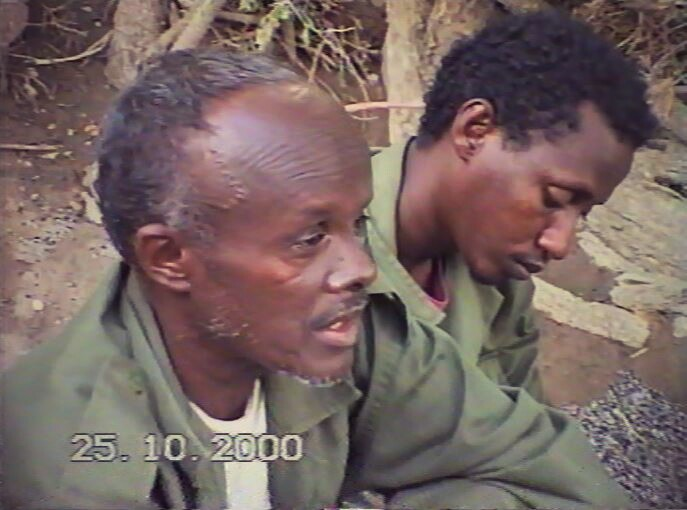
Harun (right) in a meeting with Ma'ar in Guyah

== Head of RSADO ==
After the death of Ali Osman Ma'ar on 12 April 2001, Harun was chosen to succeed to the post of Chairman of RSADO.
