= Afar Revolutionary Democratic Unity Front =

Political party in Ethiopia

Afar Revolutionary Democratic Unity Front Qafar Uguugumoh Demokrasiyyoh Inkiinoh Fooca
- Abbreviation: ARDUF
- Founded: 1993
- Merger of: ARDUU; AUDF; ARF
- Ideology: Afar interests Self-determination
- Political position: Left-wing
- National affiliation: Afar National Democratic Party (1999–2000)
- Battles and wars: Second Afar insurgency; Ethiopian civil conflict (2018–present); Tigray war; 2026 Ethiopian offensive
- Seats in the House of Federation: 0 / 112
- Seats in the House of Peoples' Representatives: 0 / 547

Party flag
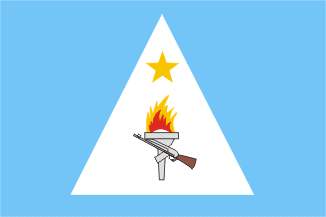

The Afar Revolutionary Democratic Unity Front (Afar: Qafar Uguugumoh Demokrasiyyoh Inkiinoh Fooca; abbreviated ARDUF) is an ethnic Afar political party and insurgent group in Ethiopia, founded in 1993. It had been a member of the United Ethiopian Democratic Forces (UEDF) coalition opposition party.

Its name is often simplified to just Uguugumo (also spelled Uguguma or Ugogomo), meaning "Revolution", a term sometimes reserved for its militant wing and often confused as being a separate organization that is simply closely tied to ARDUF.

== History ==
The party was founded in March 1993 as a coalition of three Afar organizations: the Afar Revolutionary Democratic Unity Union (ARDUU), founded in 1991 and led by Mohamooda Gaas (or Gaaz); the Afar Ummatah Demokrasiyyoh Focca (AUDF); and the Afar Revolutionary Forces (ARF). Mohamooda Gaas was elected as its Secretary General in 1995, but refused the post, leaving it to his deputy Muhyadin Mafatah, who was later extradited from Djibouti to Addis Ababa, Ethiopia in August 1996, where he was jailed with two other Afar leaders, Habib Mahammad Yayyo and Jamal Abdulkadir Redo.

== Activities ==
In March 1995, ARDUF was involved in the kidnapping of Italian tourists in the Afar Region of Ethiopia, resulting in an Ethiopian military campaign against the group, coordinated with the Eritrean government. Travelers reported clashes between ARDUF and Ethiopian government forces in the Dallol district through 1995, including attacks on the homes and property of Afar People's Democratic Organization (APDO) members as "traitors", which led an end of all traffic on caravan trade routes through the Dallol area and resulting food shortages. Political attempts at reconciliation were made in October 1997 with the creation of an Afar conference, and again in November, though both of these failed. Mohamooda Gaas made a statement declaring unilateral cease-fire with government forces on 5 June 1998 after the beginning of the 1998–2000 Eritrean-Ethiopian War and an Eritrean attack on the town of Alitena, inhabited primarily by Irob people (an ethnicity closely related linguistically to Afars). As a result of the fighting's civilian casualties, ARDUF reconciled with the Ethiopian government to minimize civilian casualties in the region and condemned the Eritrean government's attacks.

On March 2, 2007, ARDUF militants take as hostages five British embassy personnel, workers and relatives of workers, along with nine Ethiopian guides and embassy personnel, during a tour of the Afar region in Hamedela. The crisis ended without casualties or people wounded.

ARDUF claimed responsibility for a January 16, 2012 attack on a group of tourists at Erta Ale in which five were killed, some taken as hostages and others wounded. In March 2012, ARDUF released two tourists kidnapped in the attack.

On December 3, 2017, Dr. Walter Reopert, a German tourist was shot dead and his guide was injured in the assault, near the Erta Ale Volcano in Zone 2 district, Afar. Some sources suspected that the killing was carried out by the ARDUF.

As of 5 November 2021, the ARDUF announced that it had joined the United Front of Ethiopian Federalist and Confederalist Forces. However, the veteran founder of the Afar Revolutionary Democratic Unity Front, insisted that his group was never a part of the alliance at all. On 31 January 2022, the ARDUF announced that it was distancing itself from the United Front of Ethiopian Federalist and Confederalist Forces after accusing Tigrayan forces of killing civilians in the Afar Region.

== After joining UEDF ==
In July 2003, ARDUF became a member of the newly formed UEDF coalition, in opposition to the ruling EPRDF party. Soon after, on 20 September 2003, it issued a warning against foreigners entering the northern area of Afar Region for the purpose of demarcating the eastern part of the Ethiopian-Eritrean border, as it would be against the party's policy of Afar unity, who live on both sides of the eastern border:

Our twin enemies, Shabia (Isayas Afewerki's) and Weyane (Meles Zenawi's), have been, under the auspices of the United Nations, carrying out illegal acts of brigandage against our people. Let the whole world know that ARDUF is reiterating its firm stand as it did in 1990, 1991, 1993 and 2000 that it is not only opposed to the illegal act of dividing our Afar people and demarcating our soil under the guise of "border demarcation" between Ethiopia and Eritrea, but also ready to render any demarcation exercise ineffective.

== Views ==
ARDUF states that it aims to unite all Afar people under one flag. Possible interpretations included the reunion of Eritrea and Ethiopia (as well as Afar lands in Djibouti) or a separate Afar state. In 1998, ARDUF stated that it sought to unite Afars under an autonomous region of Ethiopia, similar to the Afar Region in Ethiopia in existence since 1996 and in the 2000s, but with the addition of areas in Eritrea and Djibouti. Consequently, ARDUF does not recognize Eritrea as a sovereign state.
