= Ethiopian People's Patriotic Front =

Rebel organization in Ethiopia

- የኢትዮጵያ ሕዝብ አርበኞች ግንባር
- Dates active: 1998 – present
- Groups: Ethiopian Unity Patriots Front; Ethiopian United Democratic Patriotic Movement; Ethiopian United Democratic Forces Front; Benishangul People's Liberation Movement
- Active regions: Ethiopia (since 2008); Eritrea (until 2008)
- Website: eppf.net

The Ethiopian People Patriotic Front (abbreviated EPPF; Amharic: የኢትዮጵያ ሕዝብ አርበኞች ግንባር ye’ītiyop’iya ḥizibi āribenyochi ginibari) is a rebel group in Ethiopia, founded on 15 June 1998, in the Eritrean-Ethiopian border town of Awegaro. It was originally established as the Ethiopian Democratic Forces.

== History ==
On 24 October 2000, several rebel movements from the Gambela Region and Benishangul-Gumuz Region united under the EPPF: These factions included the Ethiopian Unity Patriots Front, the Ethiopian United Democratic Patriotic Movement, the Ethiopian United Democratic Forces Front, and the Benishangul People's Liberation Movement.

In 2005, the EPPF was divided into different armed ethnic groups by the Eritrean government. In 2006, the EPPF was designated a terrorist organization by the Ethiopian government. In 2007, several members of the EPPF fled en masse and surrendered their arms to the Ethiopian government in order to escape the Eritrean government-sponsored slave labor. In 2008, the EPPF left Eritrea to fight in Ethiopia. In 2019, it works in alliance with the Fano movement.
