= 2012 Afar region tourist attack =

Terrorist attack in Ethiopia on 17 January 2012

- Part of the Second Afar insurgency
- Map of Ethiopia showing Afar Region
- Location: 13°36′23″N 40°39′41″E; Erta Ale, Afar Region, Ethiopia
- Date: 17 January 2012 (UTC+3)
- Attack type: Shooting
- Deaths: 5
- Injuries: 3
- Victim: 4 kidnapped

The 2012 Afar region tourist attack was a shooting incident on the night of 17 January 2012 at Erta Ale volcano in the Afar Region of Ethiopia which killed 5 and injured 3. Four people were kidnapped in the attack.

Bereket Simon, the country's communications minister, told Reuters the attack was carried out at 5 am on 17 January, by Eritrean-trained groups. Two foreigners, a driver, and a policeman were kidnapped. Eritrea denied having trained and armed the attackers.

It was later revealed that two Germans, two Hungarians and an Austrian were killed in the attack. Two Germans and two Ethiopians were kidnapped. Three people were injured: two Belgians and a Hungarian. The Germans were released 7 March the same year.

== See also ==
- List of terrorist incidents in 2012
