= Eritrean National Salvation Front =

Organization

- Logo of the Eritrean National Salvation Front
- Abbreviation: ENSF
- Type: Political organisation
- Chairman: Dr. Habte Tesfamariam (until January 2017); Ahmed Nasser (until March 2014)

The old flag of Eritrea, used alongside the current one by the ENSF.

The Eritrean National Salvation Front (abbreviated ENSF; Italian: Fronte di Salvezza Nazionale Eritreo) is an Eritrean opposition group in-exile. The organisation had an armed wing which fought the Eritrean government, and a radio program that operates outside of Eritrea (as only state media is allowed in the country).

It was led by Ahmed Mohammed Nasser, an Eritrean multilingual secularist, until his death in March 2014. He was replaced by his longtime friend Dr. Habte Tesfamariam, who served as chairman until he died on January 13, 2017.
