= Belessa River =

River in Ethiopia and Eritrea

Belessa River Belesa
- Native name: ሩባ በለሳ (Amharic)

Location
- Countries: Eritrea, Ethiopia

Physical characteristics
- Source: Tigray Mountains
  - location: Near Adigrat
  - coordinates: 14°17′25″N 39°25′42″E
  - elevation: 2,936 m (9,633 ft)
- Mouth: Mareb River
  - coordinates: 14°37′59″N 39°1′16″E
  - elevation: 1,410 m (4,630 ft)
- Length: 76 km (47 mi)
- Basin size: 1,775 km^{2} (685 sq mi)
- Discharge
  - location: Mouth
  - average: 4.39 m^{3}/s (155 cu ft/s)
  - minimum: 0.273 m^{3}/s (9.6 cu ft/s)
  - maximum: 24.6 m^{3}/s (870 cu ft/s)

Basin features
- Progression: Mareb → Atbarah → Nile → Mediterranean Sea
- River system: Nile Basin
- Population: 209,000

The Belessa River is a tributary of the Mereb River in Ethiopia. Part of its course forms a section of border between Ethiopia and Eritrea.
