= Red Sea Afar Democratic Organisation =

Guerilla and political organization in Ethiopia

- Leaders: Ibrahim Harun; Abdu Sheek (spokesperson Yasin Mohamed, Nasradin ALI)
- Dates active: 1999–present
- Headquarters: Afar Region, Ethiopia
- Active regions: Southern Red Sea Region, Eritrea
- Ideology: Afar self-determination

The Red Sea Afar Democratic Organisation (Afar: Qasa Badih Qafarih Dimokraasih Missoyna; Tigrinya: ዲሞክራሲያዊ ውድብ ዓፋር ቀይሕ ባሕሪ, romanized: dimokǝrāsiyāwi wǝdǝb ʿāfār qayǝḥ bāḥǝri; Arabic: التنظيم الديمقراطي لعفر البحر الأحمر, transliteration: Al-tanzim Al-dimokrati Li-'afar Al-Bahr Al-Ahmar; abbreviated RSADO) is a political organisation and armed insurgent group based in Ethiopia. The organisation is made up of mainly ethnic Afar people, and was founded in early 1999 following a revolt by the Red Sea Afar people led by Ahmed Humed, after the UN-supervised Eritrean independence referendum was held in 1993. The primary goal of RSADO is to achieve autonomy for the region known as Dankalia, inhabited mainly by the Red Sea Afar.

After several years of dormancy, in July 2025 the RSADO renewed its armed struggle against the Eritrean government.

== History ==
Following the independence of Eritrea in May 1991, indigenous Afar started to face unprecedented persecution by the totalitarian one-party government of the People’s Front for Democracy and Justice led by Isaias Afwerki.

This combined with dissatisfaction over the ruling PFDJ government led to a rebellion by the Red Sea Afar in southern Eritrea in 1999. The group used guerrilla war tactics and launched attacks in Eritrea. Though they posed great problems for the Eritrean government and army, it was also faced internal political conflicts.

After several years of dormancy, in July 2025 the RSADO renewed its armed struggle, holding a public conference in Semera in which it reaffirmed its commitment to armed conflict against the Eritrean government and accused Eritrea of oppression against the coastal Afar people. In October, after three months of training, the RSADO announced the graduation of a new unit of soldiers, with the commander Ibrahim Harun praising the unit. At the end of the announcement, the RSADO expressed “sincere gratitude” towards the Afar Region government and the Ethiopian people for their supposed support for the organisation.
