= Education in Eritrea =

Education in Eritrea is officially compulsory between 7 and 13 years of age. Important goals of Eritrea's educational policy are to provide basic education in each of Eritrea's mother tongues as well as to produce a society that is equipped with the necessary skills to function with a culture of self-reliance in the modern economy. The education infrastructure is currently inadequate to meet these needs.

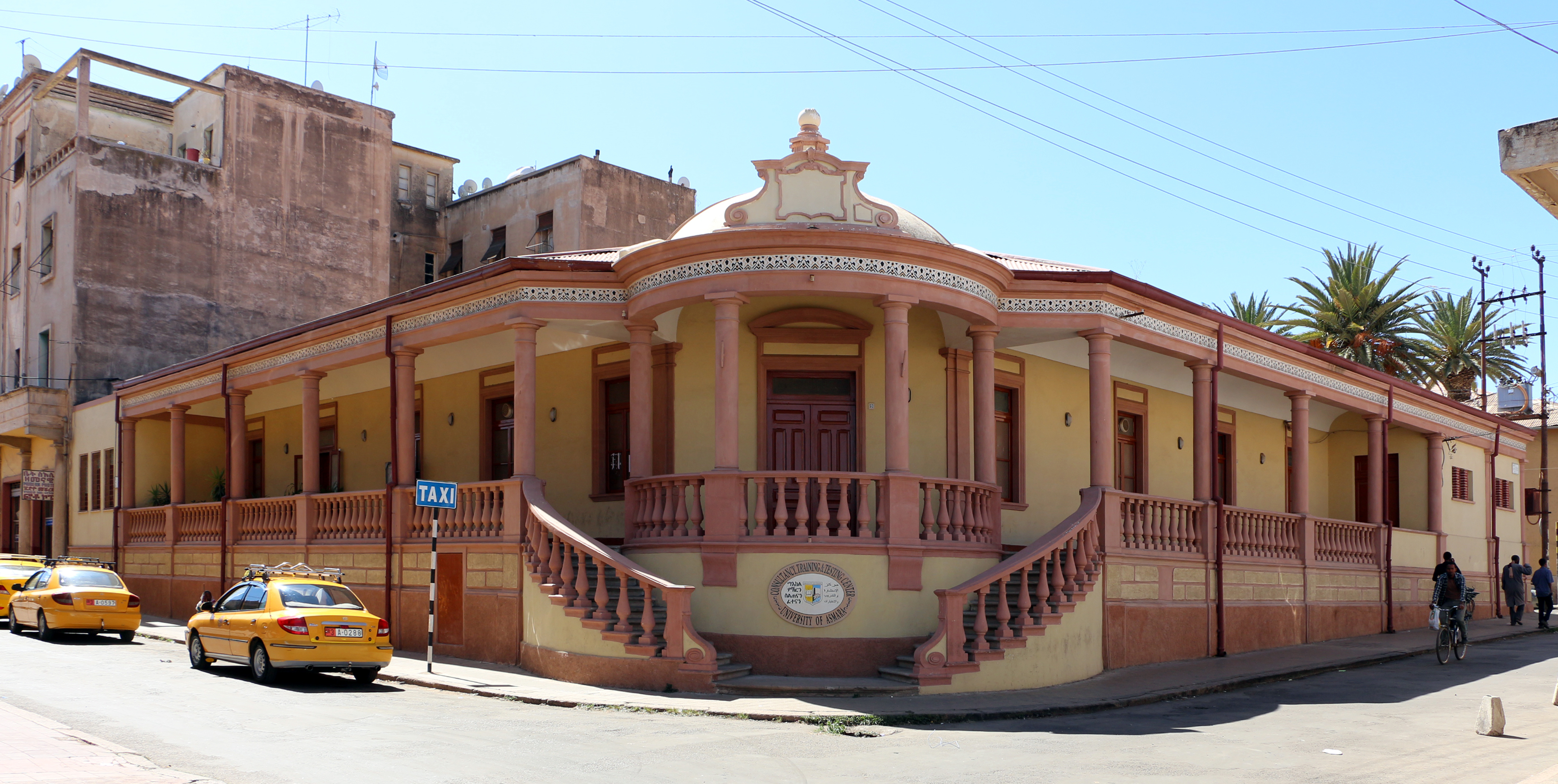
Asmara University training center

== History ==
The first school systems in Eritrea were set up by the Italian Eritrea government during the late 1930s (when was established the Eritrea Governorate). In 1940 Dr. Vincenzo Di Meglio promoted the creation of the "School of Medicine" in Asmara (within the Italian school of Asmara, Liceo Martini), under the direction of Prof. Ferro Luzzi.

In 1958, the University of Asmara was founded, albeit by a different name as the Collegio Cattolico della Santa Famiglia while ruled by the Italian religious organization called 'Piae Madres Nigritiae' ("Comboni Sisters"): successively, in 1964 the university had been renamed as "University of Asmara". In 2007, the University of Asmara was closed.

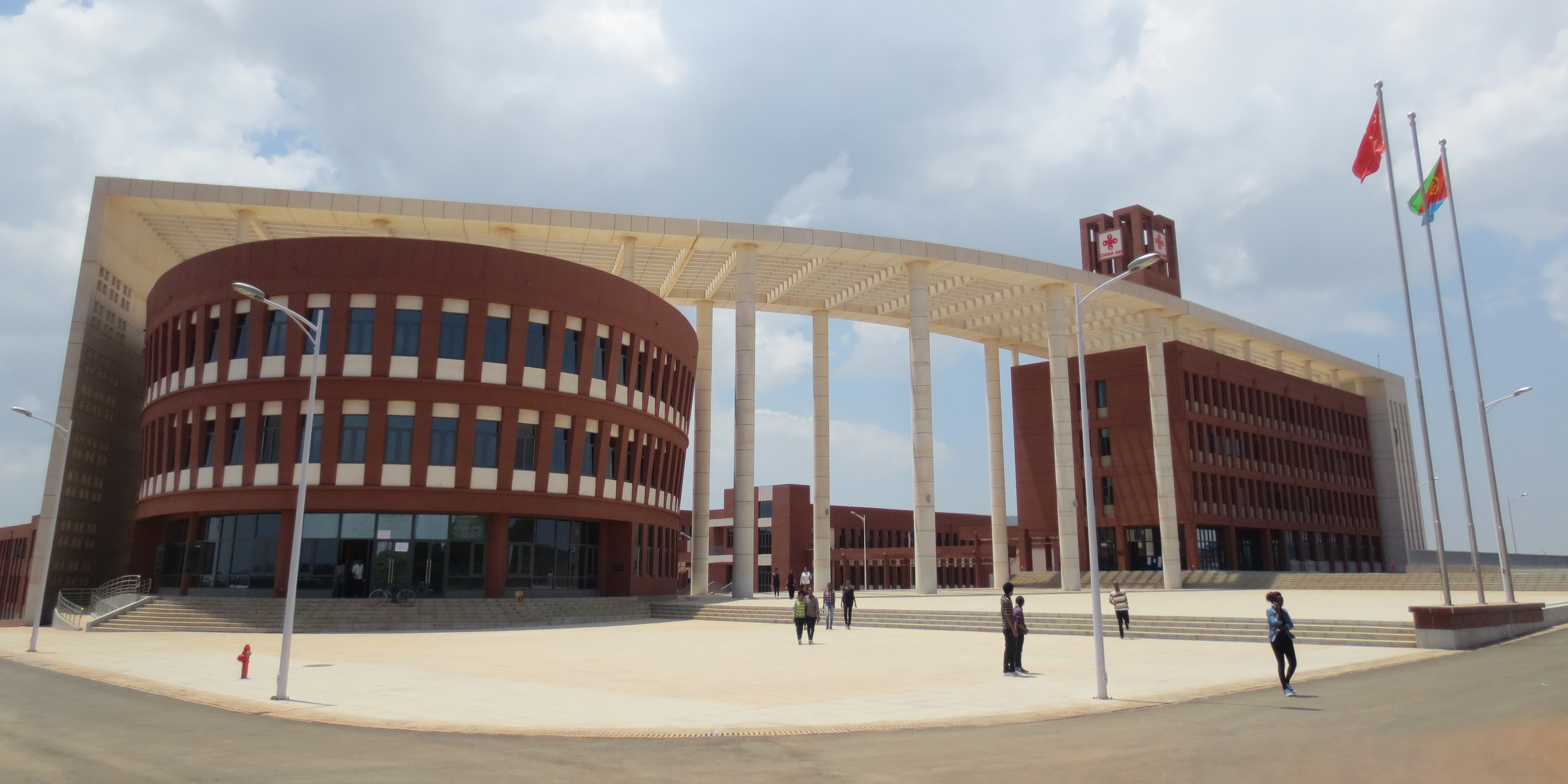
The Eritrea Institute of Technology

In the 1990s the independent Eritrea started a program to bring literacy to all children in Eritrea. Since then the school system has reached nearly 90% of young Eritreans.

A Human Rights Watch report in August 2019 suggested that the final year secondary school students are forced into compulsory military training at the Sawa military camp, where they are subjected to systematic abuse, including torture, harsh working conditions and paid insufficiently. The military personnel control the students with physical punishment, military-style discipline, and forced labour.

== Levels education ==
Education system in Eritrea
Basic Education- 7 years
Middle - Junior High School (Years included in basic)
Secondary -Secondary School - 4 years
Post- secondary - Advanced Diploma - 3 years
Higher Education - Bachelor - 4/5 years

In the Eritrean education system, basic education starts with two years of pre-primary schooling, followed by five-years of Elementary Education for children aged 6-10, and three-years of Middle School Education (grade 6-8), followed by 4 years of secondary education. All Eritrean students attend their final year of secondary education, grade 12, at Warsay-Yikealo Secondary School, within Sawa military camp. The final year of schooling is combined with over three months of military training.

Current centers of tertiary education in Eritrea include, the College of Marine Biology, the College of Agriculture, the College of Arts and Social Sciences, the College of Business and Economics, the College of Nursing and Health Technology and Eritrea Institute of Technology. There are some big primary and middle schools like Mai-Tesfa, Awet and Model.

The education system in Eritrea is also designed to promote private sector schooling, equal access for all groups (i.e. prevent gender discrimination, prevent ethnic discrimination, prevent class discrimination, etc.) and promote continuing education through formal and informal systems.

== Statistics ==
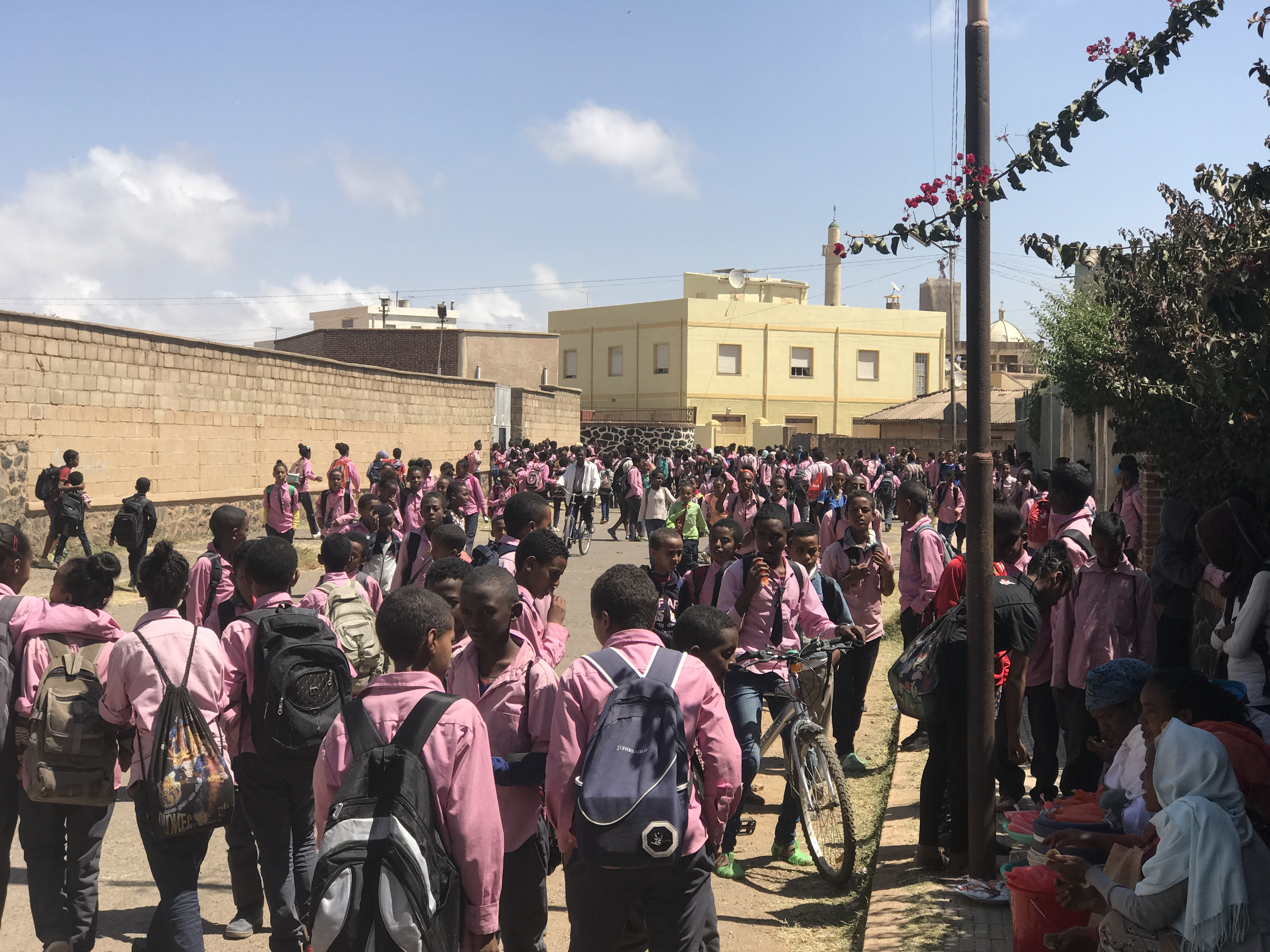
Pupils in uniform

In 2005, there were approximately 824 schools and nearly 238,000 students in the primary, middle, and secondary levels of education. For the year 2023, the government reported that there were 709 Pre-primary schools, 1076 Elementary schools, 447 Middle schools and 119 Secondary schools, for a total of 2,351 schools.

The overall literacy rate in Eritrea is estimated to be about 84 percent in 2020. In the age 15–24 the literacy rate is 89 percent. "The Ministry [of Education] plans to establish a university in every region in the future."

== Challenges ==
Barriers to education in Eritrea include traditional taboos, school fees (for registration and materials), and the cost barriers of low-income households.

According to a 2005 report, between 39 and 57 percent of school-aged children attend primary school and 21 percent attend secondary school. Student-teacher ratios are high: 45 to 1 at the elementary level and 54 to 1 at the secondary level. Learning hours at school are often less than four hours per day. Skill shortages are present at all levels of the education system, and funding for and access to education vary significantly by gender (with dropout rates much higher for girls) and location.
