= Mehari (disambiguation) =

Mehari or Méhari may refer to:

- Mehari (name), Amharic-language given name and surname (also Tigrigna-language) meaning merciful)
- MEHARI (acronym of MEthod for Harmonized Analysis of RIsk), a free, open-source information risk analysis assessment and risk management method
- Mehari Union, a union of Kasba Upazila in the Brahmanbaria district of Bangladesh
- Méhari, riding dromedaries used in Méhariste camel cavalry units
- Citroën Méhari, off-road compact SUV produced 1968–1988
- Citroën E-Méhari, off-road compact SUV produced 2016–2019
