= Asmara =

Capital and largest city of Eritrea

- Capital city
- ኣስመራ
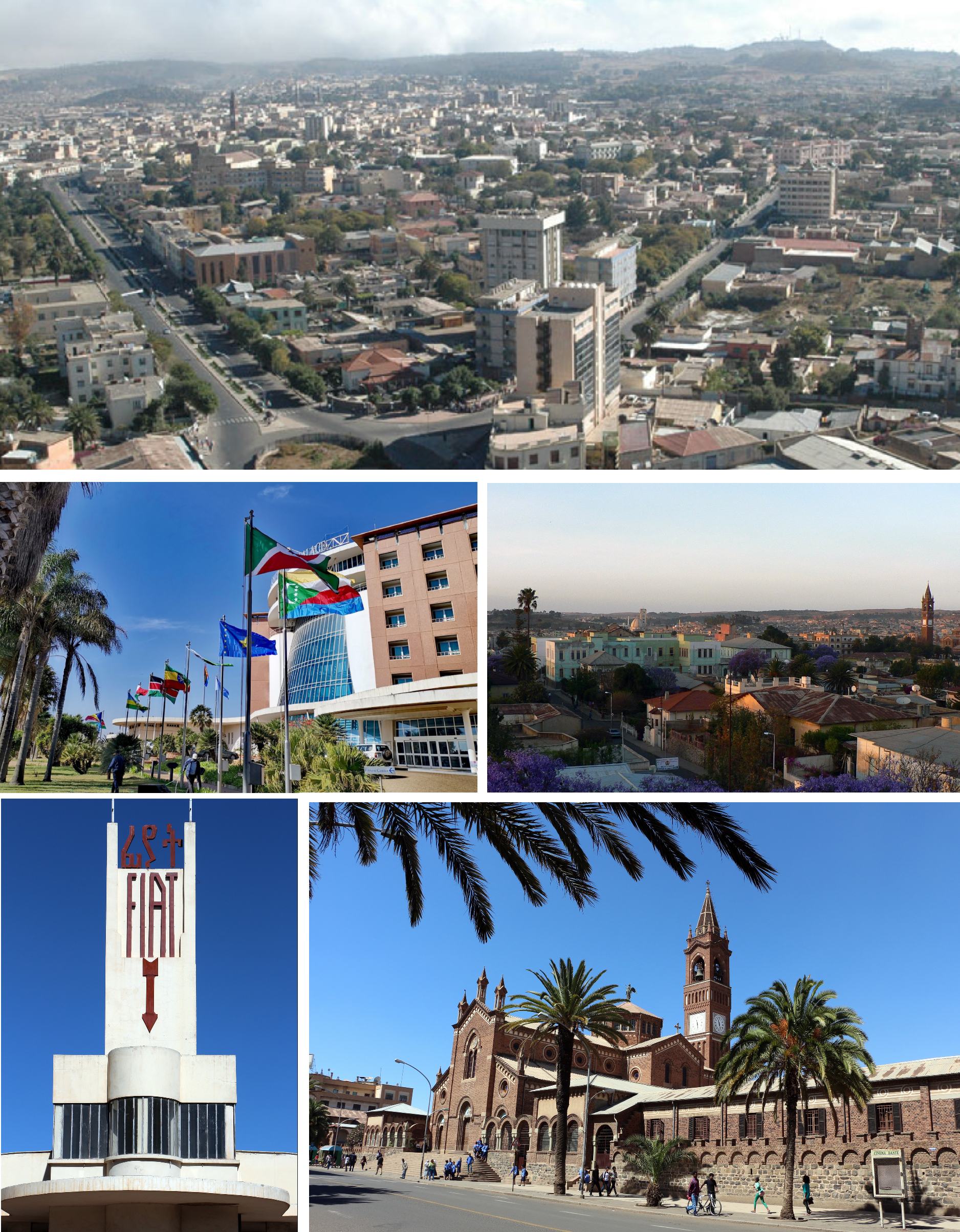
- Clockwise from top: Cityscape, Sunset view over Asmara, Church of Our Lady of the Rosary, Fiat Tagliero Building sign, 23d ISCOE East Africa conference in Asmara 2019

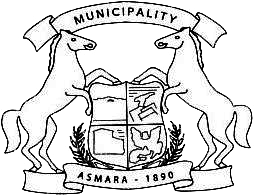
- Coat of arms

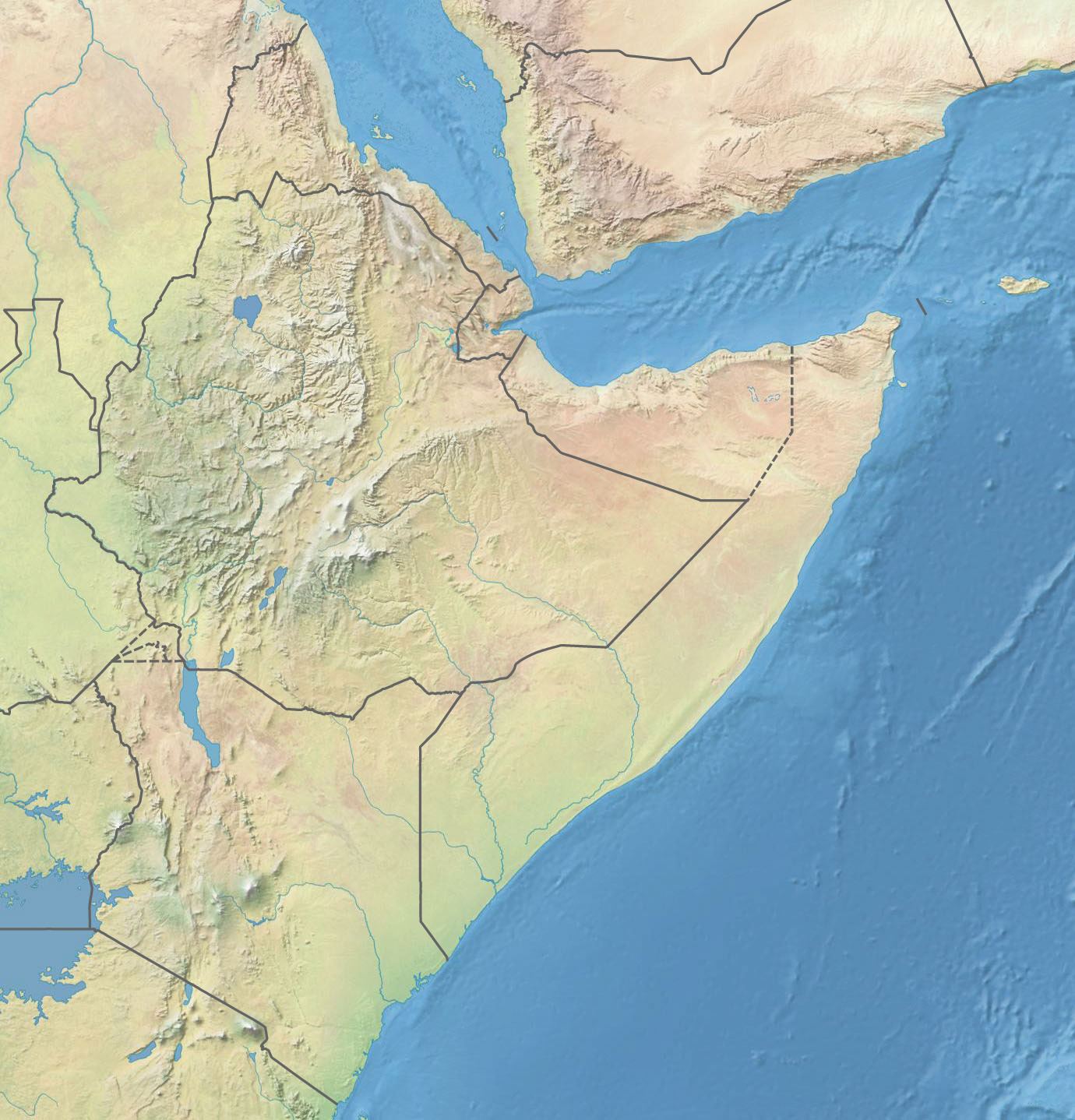
- Location within Eritrea Location within Africa Asmara (Africa)
- Coordinates: 15°20′09″N 38°56′28″E
- Country: Eritrea
- Region: Central
- Districts: 13
- Demonym: Asmarino
- Settled: 800 BC
- Incorporated: 1890

Government
  - Mayor of Asmara: Unknown

Area
  - Capital city: 45 km^{2} (17 sq mi)
- Elevation: 2,325 m (7,628 ft)

Population (2023)
  - Capital city: 1,073,000
  - Rank: 1st in Eritrea
  - Density: 19,911/km^{2} (51,570/sq mi)
  - Metro: 1,258,001
- Time zone: UTC+03:00 (EAT)
- HDI (2019): ▲0.630; medium · 1st
- Climate: BSk

UNESCO World Heritage Site
- Official name: Asmara: A Modernist African City
- Criteria: Cultural: ii, iv
- Reference: 1550
- Inscription: 2017 (41st Session)
- Area: 481 ha (1,190 acres)
- Buffer zone: 1,203 ha (2,970 acres)

Asmara (/æsˈmɑːrə/ əs-MAHR-ə), or Asmera, is the capital and most populous city of Eritrea, in the country's Central Region. It sits at an elevation of 2,325 metres (7,628 ft), making it the sixth-highest capital in the world by altitude and the second-highest capital in Africa. The city is located at the tip of an escarpment that is both the northwestern edge of the Eritrean Highlands and the Great Rift Valley in neighbouring Ethiopia. In 2017, the city was declared as a UNESCO World Heritage Site for its well-preserved Italian colonial modernist architecture. According to local traditions, the city was founded after four separate villages unified to live together peacefully after long periods of conflict. Asmara existed as a major settlement for over half a millennium and enjoyed some importance as it stood on the trade route to Massawa.

Asmara first rose to prominence during the 20th century, when it became capital of Italian Eritrea. Under Italian rule the city of Asmara experienced rapid urbanization and modernization, to the point that was called Piccola Roma (Little Rome).

== History ==
According to Eritrean Tigrinya oral traditional history, there were four clans living in the Asmera area on the Kebessa Plateau: the Gheza Gurtom, the Gheza Shelele, the Gheza Serenser and Gheza Asmae. These villages were frequently attacked by clans from the lowlands, until the women of each clan decided that to preserve peace the four clans must unite. The men accepted, hence the name "Arbate Asmera". Arbate Asmera literally means, in the Tigrinya language, "the four (feminine plural) made them unite".

The first mention of Asmara comes from a Latin itinerary during the reign of Emperor Dawit I (1382–1411).

=== Asmara in the 19th Century ===
The importance of Asmara grew in the late 19th century, when it first became the capital of Bahr Negash Gerada Zeray, assuming a role comparable to that previously held by Debarwa.

It later subsequently came under the control of several regional chiefs, including Ras Hailu Teweledemedhin, Ras Woldemichael Solomon, and finally Ras Alula prior to its incorporation into Italian Eritrea.

The town was later occupied by Italian forces in coordination with several local chiefs, most notably Aberra Kasa Hailu, the grandson of Hailu Teweledemedhin.

=== Italian Asmara ===
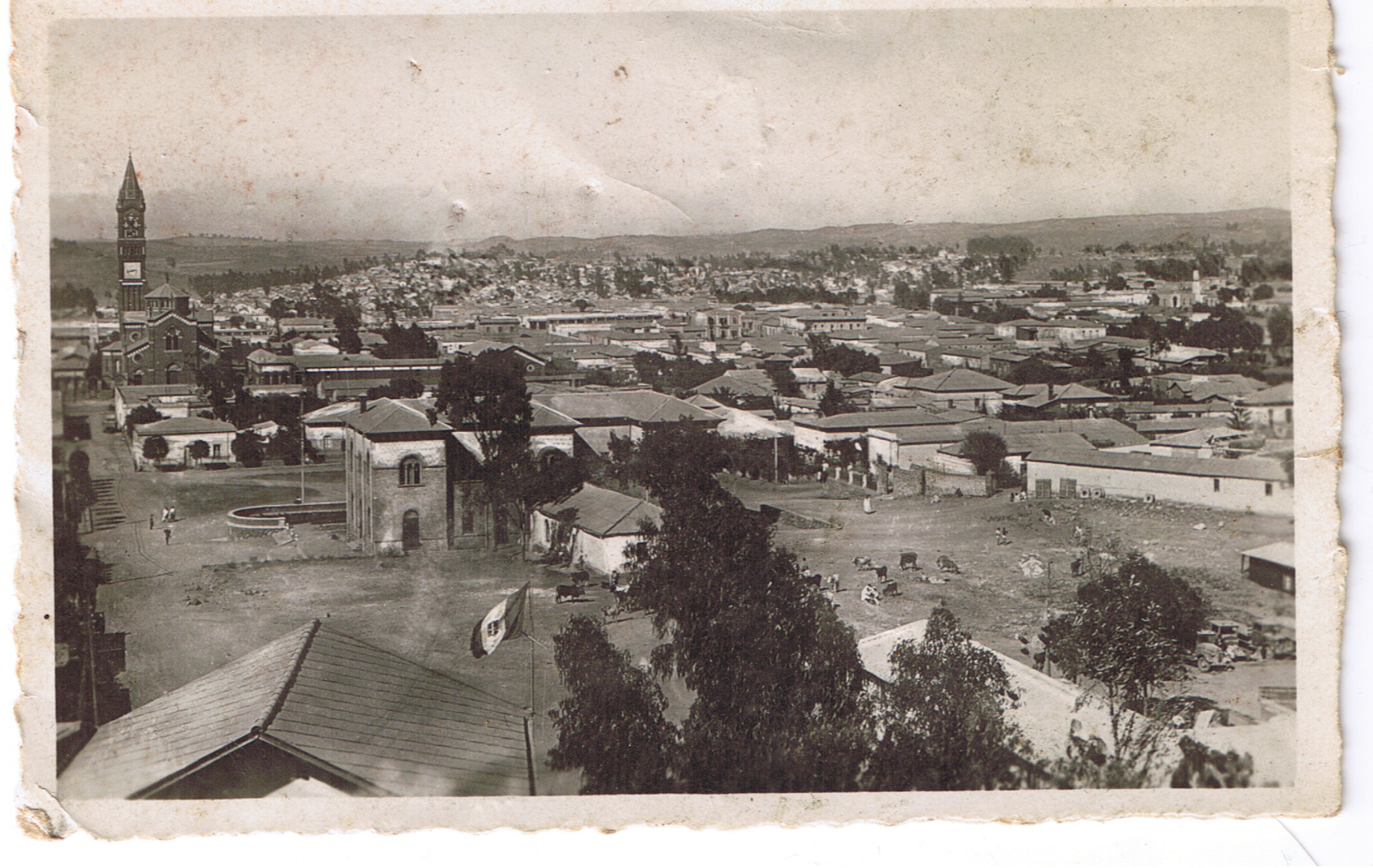
Asmara in 1935

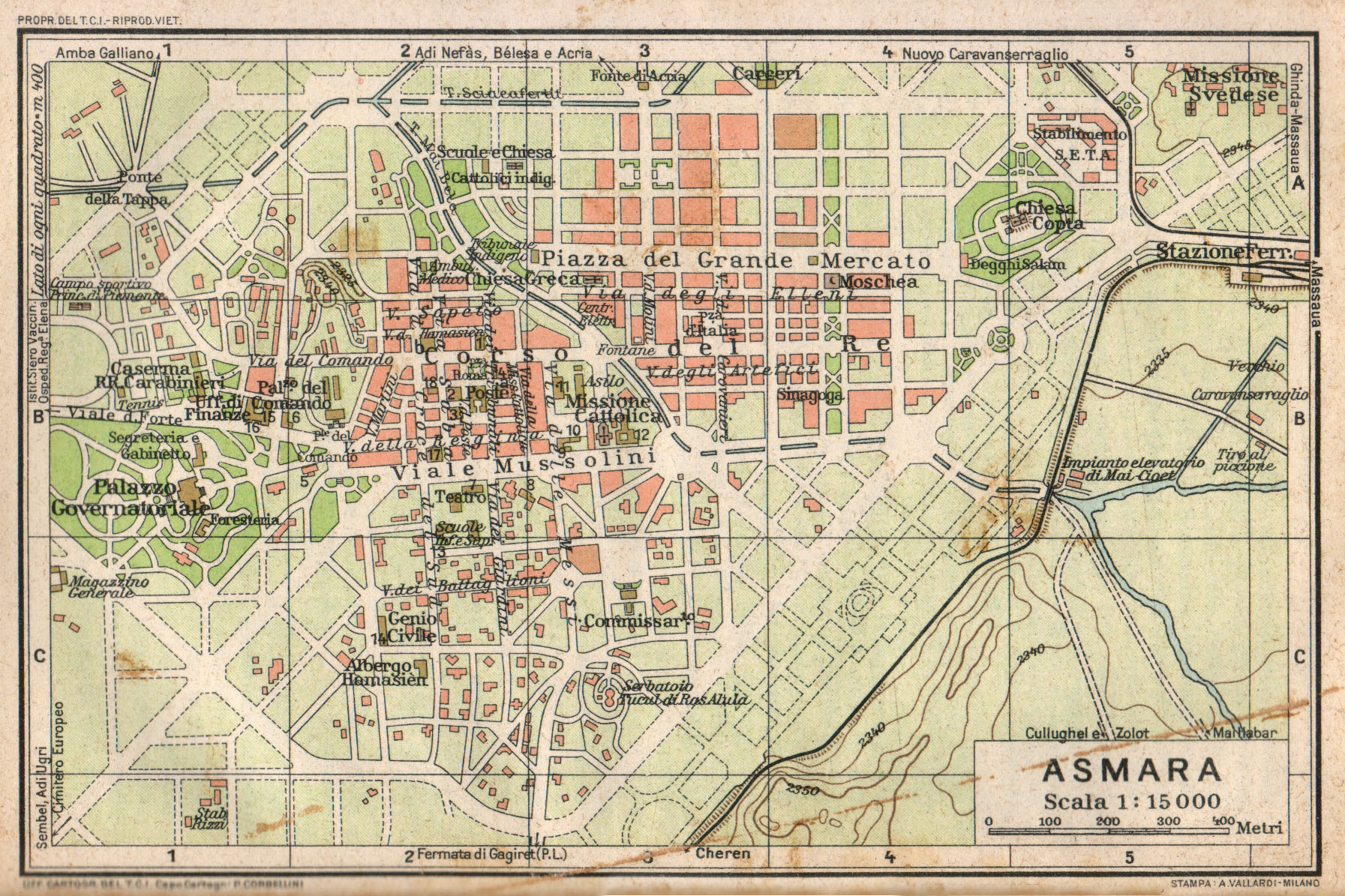
Map of Italian Asmara in 1929

Asmara, a small village in the nineteenth century, started to grow quickly when it was occupied by Italy in 1889. Governor Ferdinando Martini made it the capital city of Italian Eritrea in 1897.

In the early 20th century, the Eritrean Railway was built to the coast, passing through the town of Ghinda, under the direction of Carlo Cavanna. In both 1913 and 1915 the city suffered only slight damage in large earthquakes.

A large Italian community developed the city. According to the 1939 census, Asmara had a population of 98,000, of whom 53,000 were Italian. Only 75,000 Italians lived in all of Eritrea, thus making the capital city by far their largest centre. (Compare this to the Italian colonization of Libya, where the settler population, albeit larger, was more dispersed.)

The capital acquired an Italian architectural look. Europeans used Asmara "to experiment with radical new designs". By the late 1930s, Asmara was called Piccola Roma (Little Rome). Journalist John Gunther noted in 1955 that "the Italians built [Asmara] well, like Tripoli, with handsome wide streets, ornate public buildings, and even such refinements of civilization as a modern sewage system ... [Asmara] gives the impression of being a pleasant enough small city in Calabria, or even Umbria.” Nowadays more than 400 buildings are of Italian origin, and many shops still have Italian names (e.g., Bar Vittoria, Pasticceria moderna, Casa del formaggio, and Ferramenta).

The Kingdom of Italy invested in the industrial development of Asmara (and surrounding areas of Eritrea), but the beginning of World War II brought this to a halt.

UNESCO made Asmara a World Heritage Site in July 2017, saying "It is an exceptional example of early modernist urbanism at the beginning of the 20th century and its application in an African context".

=== Federation with Ethiopia ===
In 1952, the United Nations resolved to federate the former colony under Ethiopian rule. During the Federation, Asmara was no longer the capital city. The capital was now Addis Ababa, over 1,000 kilometres (620 miles) to the south. In 1961, Emperor Haile Selassie I ended the "federal" arrangement and declared the territory to be the 14th province of the Ethiopian Empire. Ethiopia's biggest ally was the United States. The city was home to the US Army's Kagnew Station installation from 1943 until 1977. The Eritrean War of Independence began in 1961 and ended in 1991, resulting in the independence of Eritrea. Asmara was left relatively undamaged throughout the war, as were the majority of highland regions. After independence, Asmara again became the capital of Eritrea.

== Geography ==
The city lies at an elevation of 2,325 metres (7,628 feet) above sea level. It lies on north–south trending highlands known as the Eritrean Highlands, an extension of the Ethiopian Highlands. The temperate central portion, where Asmara lies, is situated on a rocky highland plateau, which separates the western lowlands from the eastern coastal plains. The lands that surround Asmara are very fertile, especially those to the south towards the Debub Region of Eritrea. The highlands that Asmara is located in fall away to reveal the eastern lowlands, characterized by the searing heat and humidity of the Eritrean salt pans, lapped by the Red Sea. To the west of the plateau stretches a vast semi-arid hilly terrain continuing all the way towards the border with Sudan through the Gash-Barka Region.

=== Climate ===
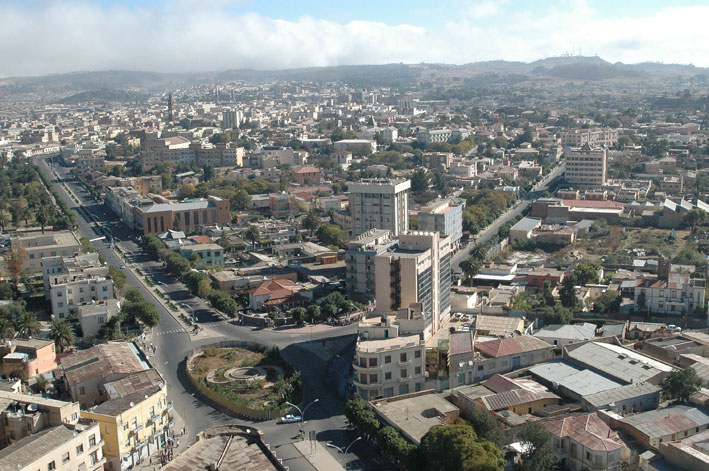
A view over Asmara

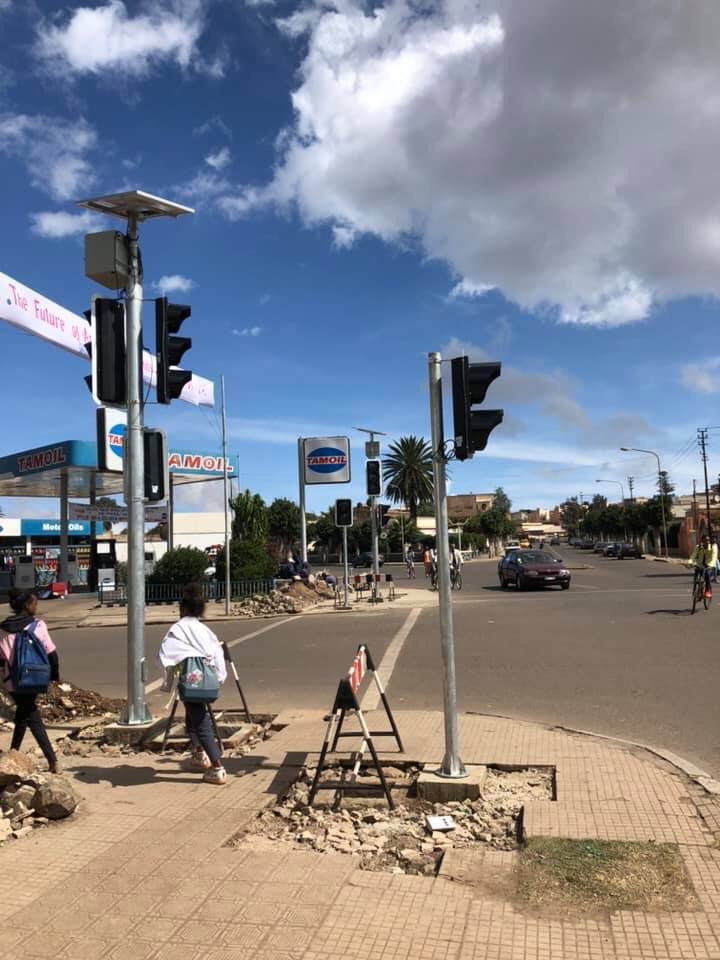
Solar-powered traffic lights in a street in Asmara

Asmara has a cool semi-arid climate (BSk) according to the Köppen climate classification. It has year-round moderately warm weather, with recorded temperatures ranging between a minimum of −4.5 °C or 23.9 °F and a maximum of 31.0 °C or 87.8 °F. It has an average humidity of 51% and an UV-index of 6. Holdridge life zones system of bioclimatic classification put Asmara in or near the subtropical thorn woodland biome. Rainfall patterns differ from month to month with highest precipitation in July and August, and lower precipitation in other months.

Asmara has warm, but not hot summers and mild winters. Due to its 2,325-metre (7,628 ft) altitude, temperatures are relatively mild for a city located not particularly far from the hotter surroundings in the country. This climate is characteristic of rainy, wet seasons and dry seasons. Asmara averages about 518 mm (20.4 in) of precipitation annually. Frost, however, is extremely rare in the city. The long dry season of the year extends from September until around April, and a season of occasional showers occurs from April to June. On average, about 60% of Asmara's annual precipitation is experienced during the months of July and August. In contrast, December to February are typically Asmara's driest months, where on average only 9.1 mm (0.36 in) of precipitation falls in the three months combined. Due to variable rainfall, Asmara's climate is also characterized by drought. Several prolonged droughts in this region have occurred beginning in the 1960s and have recurred each decade since then. During periods of drought, temperatures are high and little rainfall occurs. As temperatures in a region increase, the rate of evaporation of water from the soil also increases. These combined processes result in the desertification of the soil. In order to obtain nutrient rich and moist soil for farming purposes, populations rely on deforestation to make use of the underlying ground. The most serious environmental issues Asmara faces are deforestation and desertification. Other issues Asmara faces are soil erosion and overgrazing. All of these environmental issues produce soil degradation.

Climate data for Asmara, Eritrea (1961–1990 normals, extremes 1903–2012)
Month	Jan	Feb	Mar	Apr	May	Jun	Jul	Aug	Sep	Oct	Nov	Dec	Year
Record high °C (°F)	29.0 (84.2)	29.2 (84.6)	30.5 (86.9)	31.0 (87.8)	30.0 (86.0)	29.4 (84.9)	29.4 (84.9)	27.4 (81.3)	27.2 (81.0)	31.0 (87.8)	26.7 (80.1)	26.2 (79.2)	31.0 (87.8)
Mean daily maximum °C (°F)	22.3 (72.1)	23.8 (74.8)	25.1 (77.2)	25.1 (77.2)	25.0 (77.0)	24.9 (76.8)	21.6 (70.9)	21.5 (70.7)	22.9 (73.2)	21.7 (71.1)	21.5 (70.7)	21.5 (70.7)	23.1 (73.6)
Daily mean °C (°F)	13.8 (56.8)	14.9 (58.8)	16.3 (61.3)	17.0 (62.6)	17.6 (63.7)	17.6 (63.7)	16.3 (61.3)	16.1 (61.0)	15.7 (60.3)	14.9 (58.8)	14.0 (57.2)	13.2 (55.8)	15.6 (60.1)
Mean daily minimum °C (°F)	4.3 (39.7)	5.1 (41.2)	7.5 (45.5)	8.7 (47.7)	10.2 (50.4)	10.5 (50.9)	10.8 (51.4)	10.7 (51.3)	8.6 (47.5)	8.1 (46.6)	6.6 (43.9)	4.8 (40.6)	8.0 (46.4)
Record low °C (°F)	−4.5 (23.9)	−1.6 (29.1)	−0.8 (30.6)	−0.2 (31.6)	2.0 (35.6)	3.4 (38.1)	3.9 (39.0)	3.7 (38.7)	0.2 (32.4)	1.0 (33.8)	−0.5 (31.1)	−1.4 (29.5)	−4.5 (23.9)
Average precipitation mm (inches)	3.7 (0.15)	2.0 (0.08)	14.6 (0.57)	33.4 (1.31)	41.1 (1.62)	38.5 (1.52)	174.9 (6.89)	155.6 (6.13)	15.6 (0.61)	15.4 (0.61)	20.4 (0.80)	3.4 (0.13)	518.6 (20.42)
Average rainy days (≥ 1.0 mm)	0	0	2	4	5	4	13	12	2	2	2	1	47
Average relative humidity (%)	54	48	46	49	48	48	76	80	59	63	66	61	58.2
Mean monthly sunshine hours	291.4	260.4	275.9	264.0	257.3	219.0	151.9	158.1	213.0	272.8	276.0	282.1	2,921.9
Percentage possible sunshine	84	81	75	71	65	57	38	41	59	76	82	82	67
Source 1: NOAA
Source 2: Meteo Climat (extremes)

== Culture ==
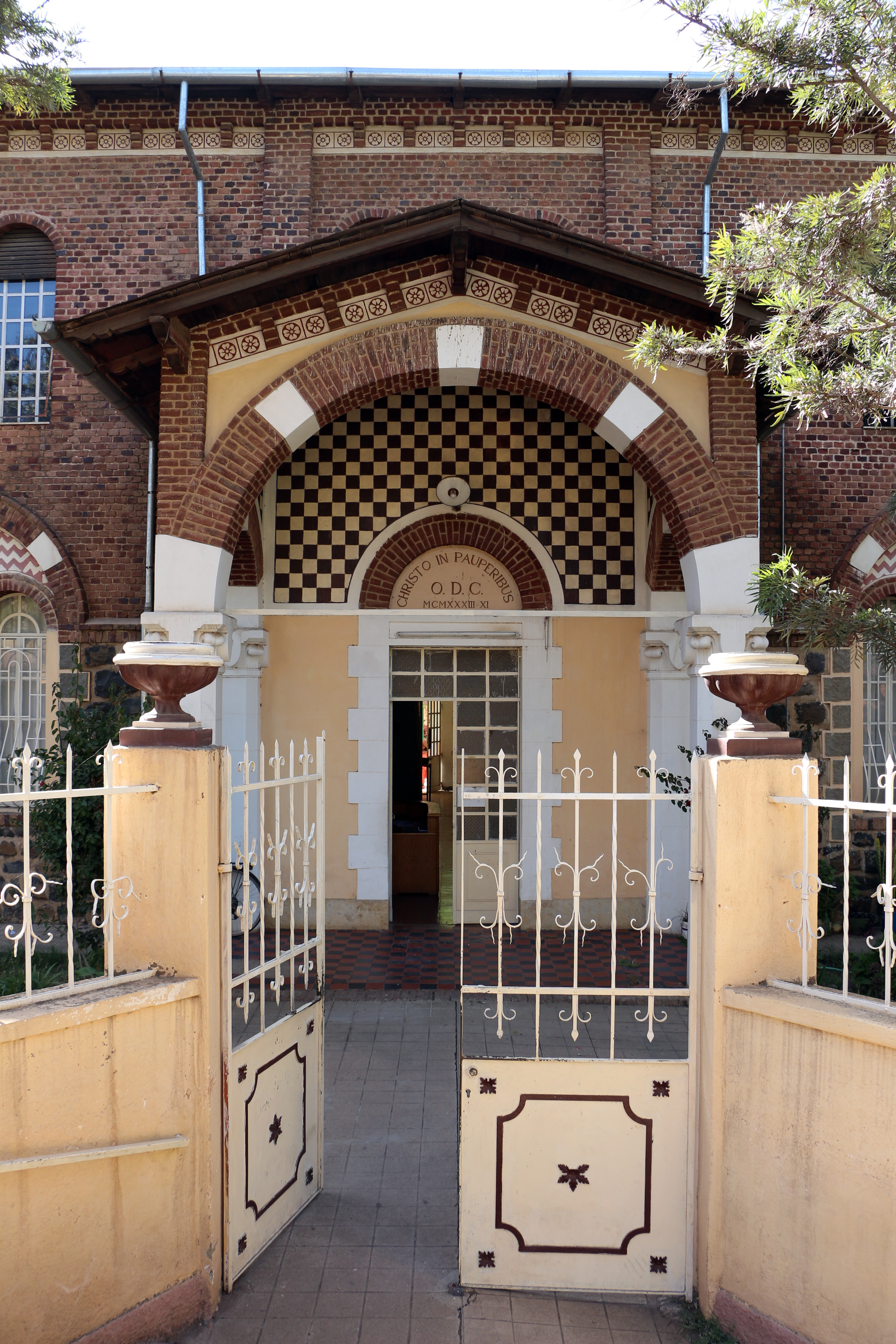
The Eritrean national museum in Asmara

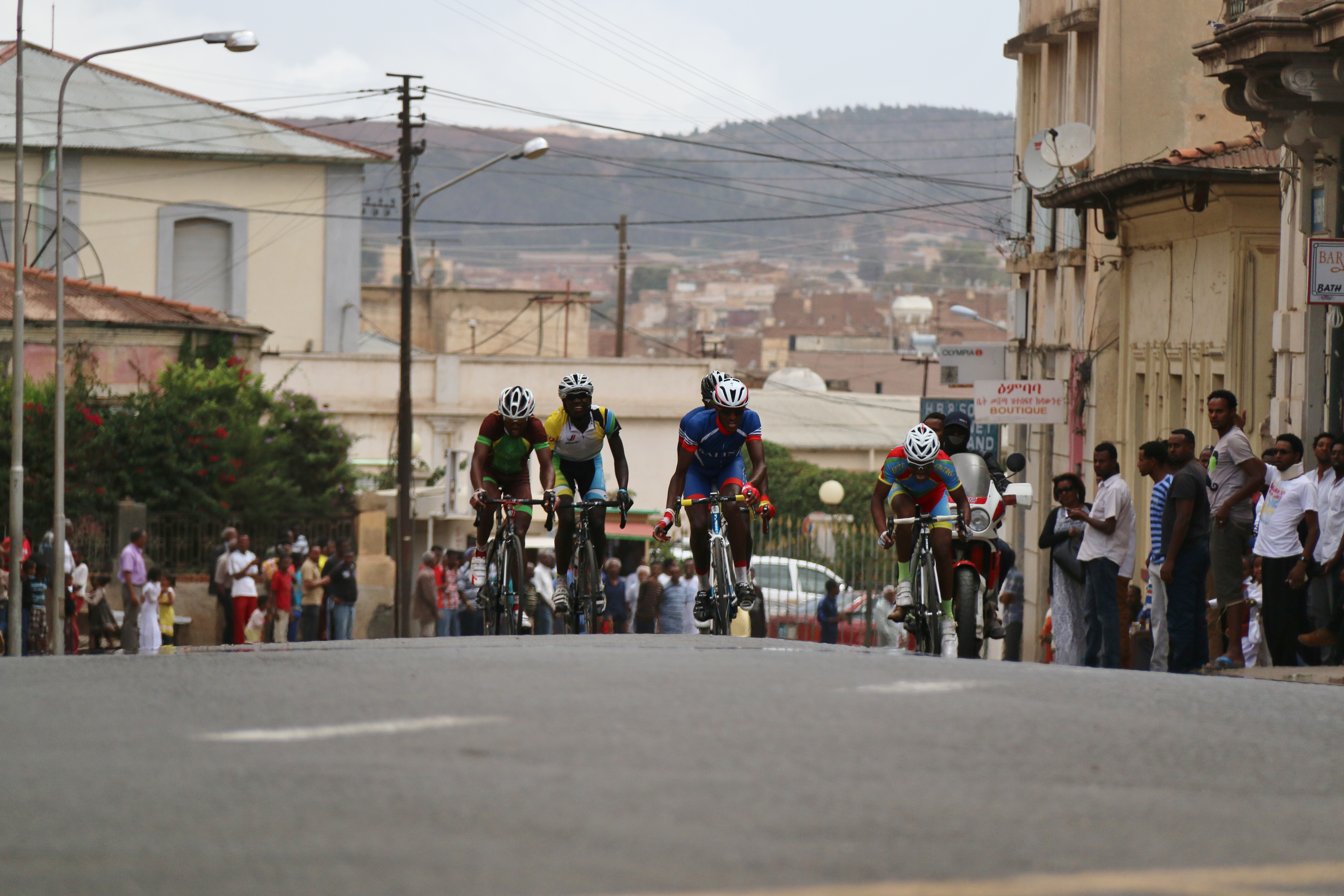
Tour of Eritrea cycling competition in Asmara, Eritrea

The city is home to the Eritrean National Museum. The city is often the starting point of the Tour of Eritrea cycling competition.

== Architecture ==
The city is known for its early 20th-century buildings, including the Art Deco Cinema Impero (opened in 1937 and considered by the experts one of the world's finest examples of Art Déco style building), Cubist Africa Pension, eclectic Eritrean Orthodox Enda Mariam Cathedral and former Opera House, the futurist Fiat Tagliero Building, the neo-Romanesque Church of Our Lady of the Rosary, Asmara, and the neoclassical Governor's Palace. The city is adorned by Italian colonial villas and mansions, one prominent example being the World Bank Building. Most of central Asmara was built between 1935 and 1941, so the Italians effectively managed to build almost an entire city in just six years. At this time, the dictator Benito Mussolini had great plans for a second Roman Empire in Africa. War cut this short, but his injection of funds created the Asmara of today, which supposedly was to be a symbol to the colonial fascism during that period of time.

The city shows off most early 20th-century architectural styles. Some buildings are neo-Romanesque, such as the Church of Our Lady of the Rosary, some villas are built in a late Victorian style. Art Deco influences are found throughout the city. Essences of Cubism can be found on the Africa Pension Building, and on a small collection of buildings. The Fiat Tagliero Building shows almost the height of futurism, just as it was coming into big fashion in Italy.

Asmara is known to be an exceptionally modern city, not only because of its architecture, but Asmara also had more traffic lights than Rome did when the city was being built. The city incorporates many features of a planned city.

=== Restaurants, bars, cafes ===
Asmara has wide streets, restaurants, piazzas (town squares), bars and cafes while many of the boulevards are lined with palm trees. The Italian inspired food and culture is very present and was introduced during Italian Eritrea. Countless restaurants and cafes, serve high quality espresso, cappuccinos and lattes, as well as gelato parlours and restaurants with Italian Eritrean cuisine. Common dishes served from the Italian Eritrean cuisine are 'Pasta al Sugo e Berbere', which means "pasta with tomato sauce and berbere" (spice), "lasagna" and "cotoletta alla milanese" (milano cutlet).

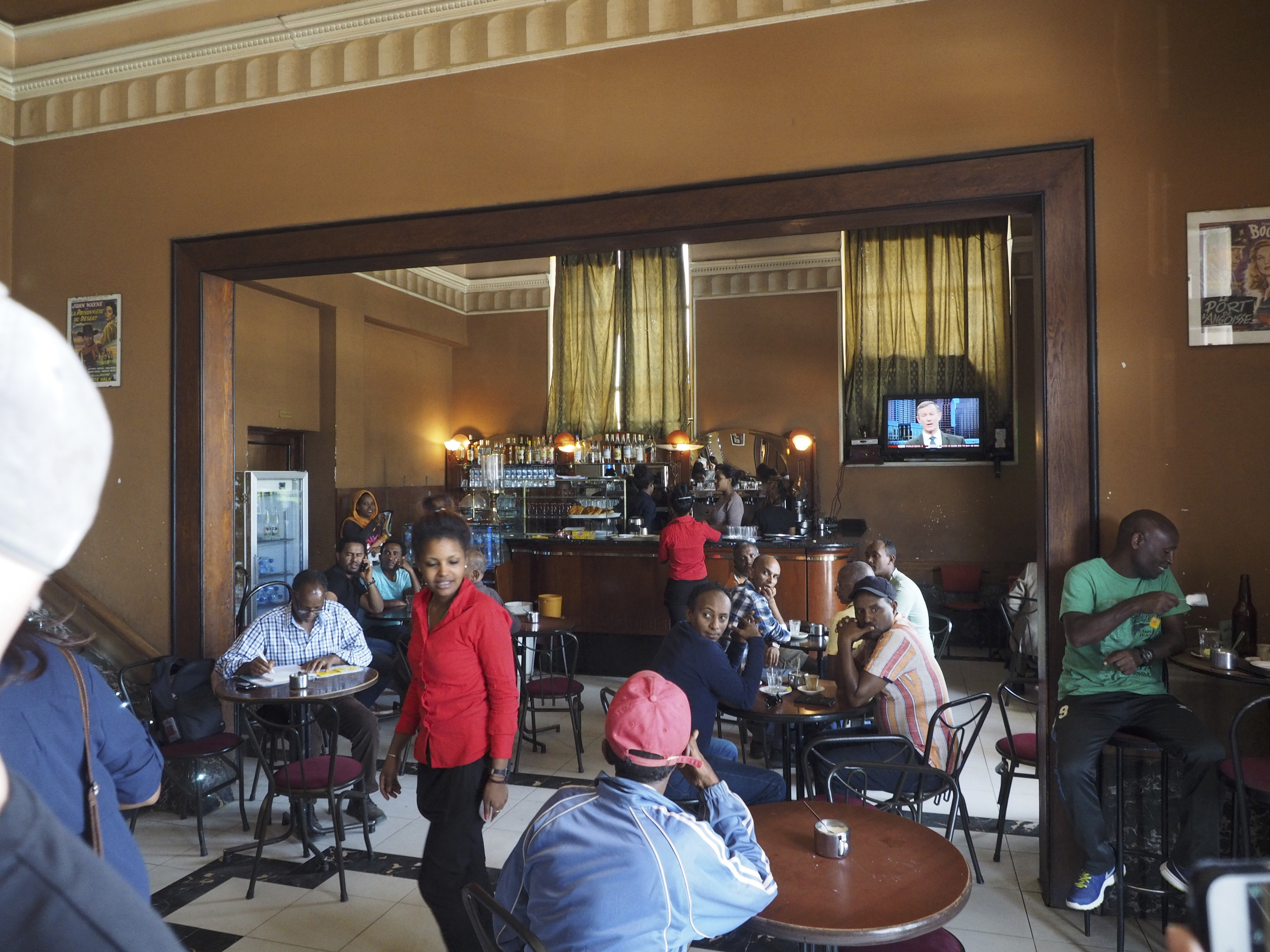
The cafe and bar at the old Cinema Roma

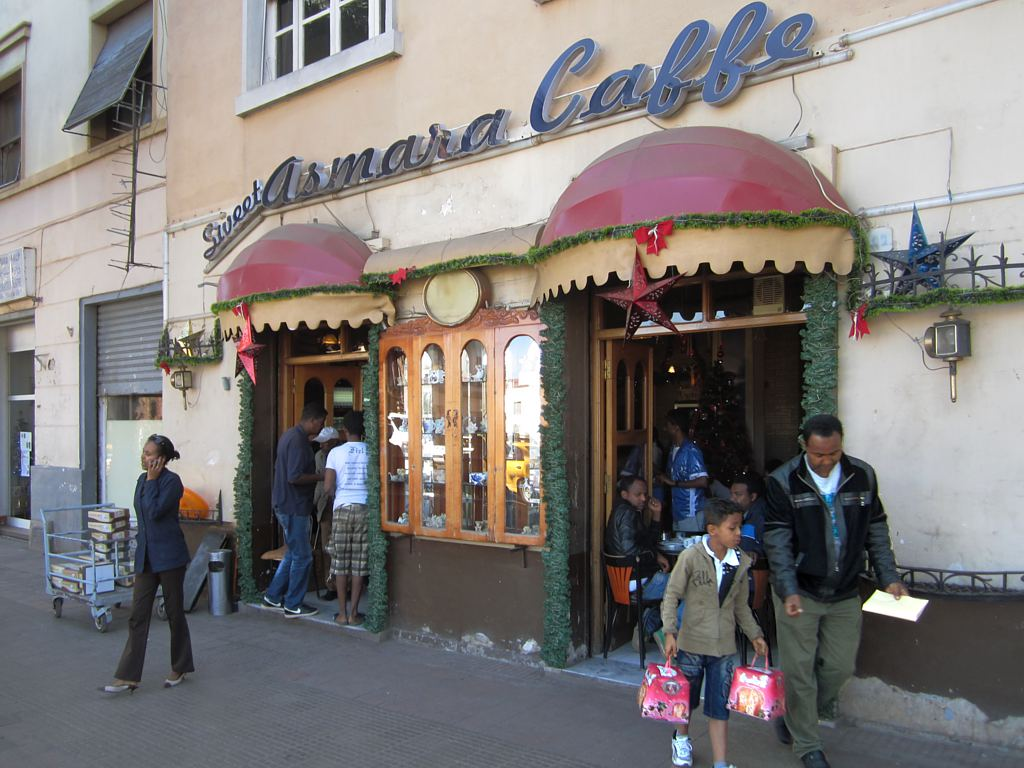
A typical cafe in Asmara selling panettone

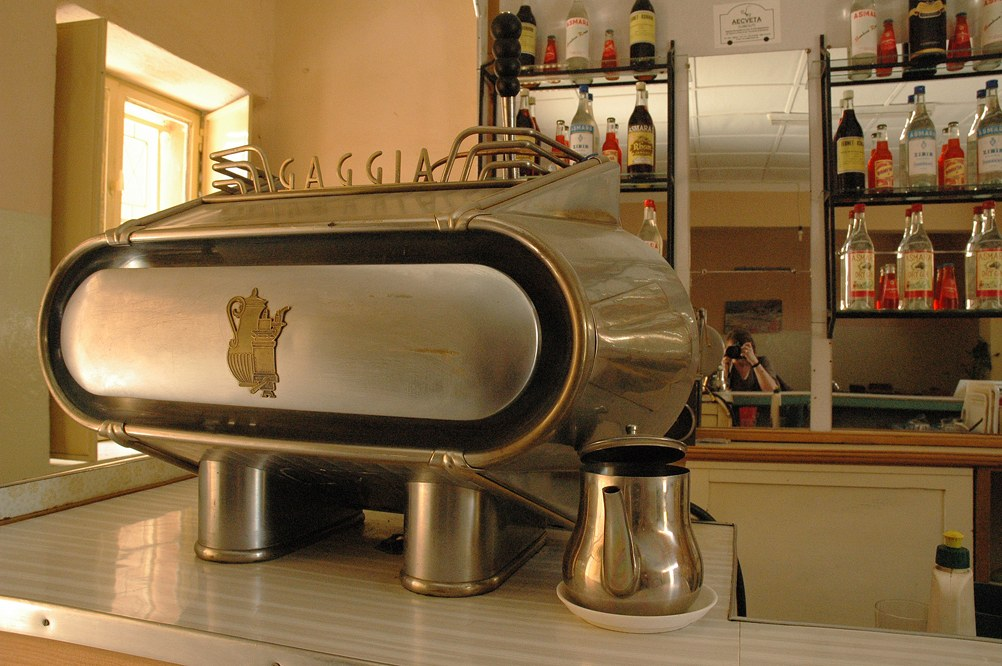
A vintage Gaggia espresso machine in a bar in Eritrea. Vintage Italian machinery is common in most Asmara cafes.

== UNESCO World Heritage Site ==
Asmara was listed as a UNESCO World Heritage Site in July 2017, becoming the first modernist city anywhere to be listed in its entirety. The inscription taking place during the 41st World Heritage Committee Session.

The city has thousands of Art Deco, futurist, modernist, and rationalist buildings, constructed during the period of Italian Eritrea. The city, nicknamed "La piccola Roma" ("Little Rome"), is located over 2,000 meters above sea level, and was an ideal spot for construction due to the relatively cool climate; architects used a combination of both Italian and local materials.

Some notable buildings include the Fiat Tagliero Building, Bar Zilli, opera houses, hotels, and cinemas, such as the Cinema Impero.

A statement from UNESCO read:

It is an exceptional example of early modernist urbanism at the beginning of the 20th century and its application in an African context.

— UNESCO

Some buildings included in the UNESCO World Heritage Site list for Asmara:
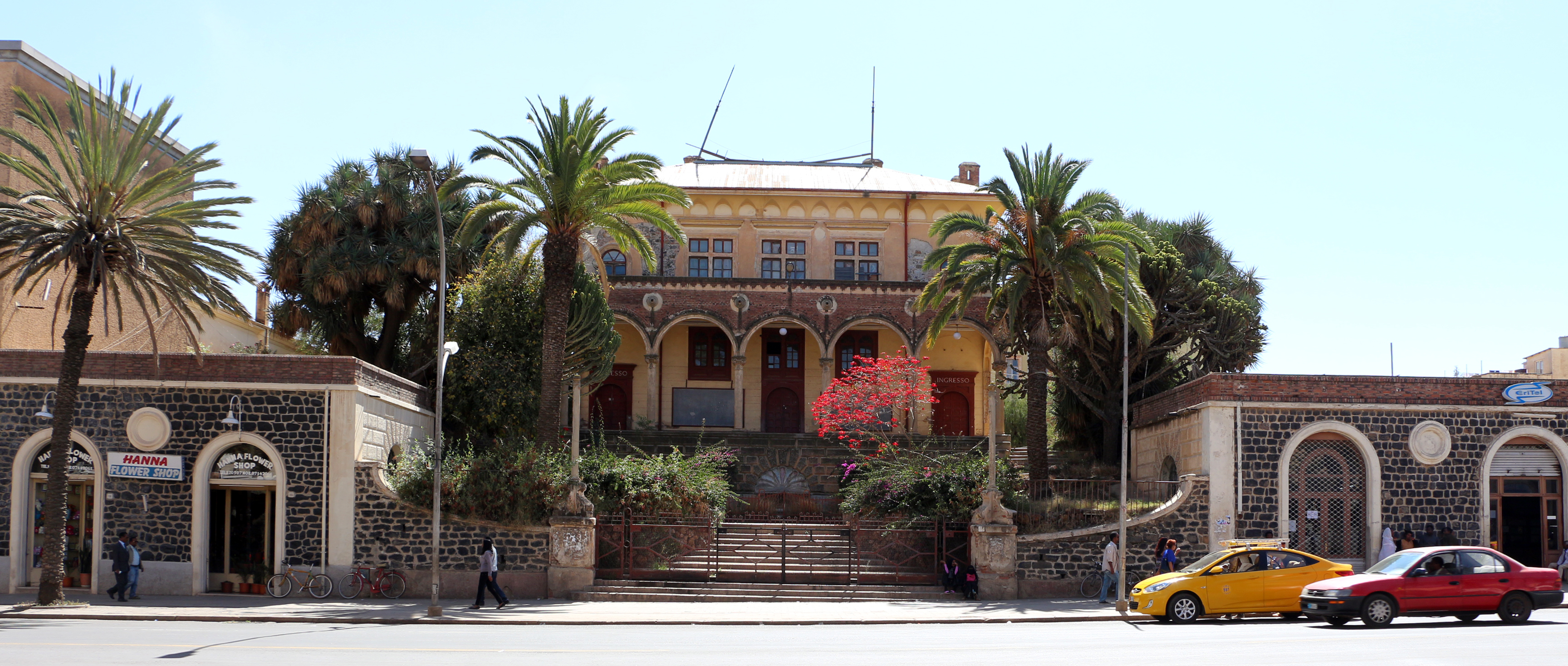
Teatro d'Opera, the opera house of Asmara.

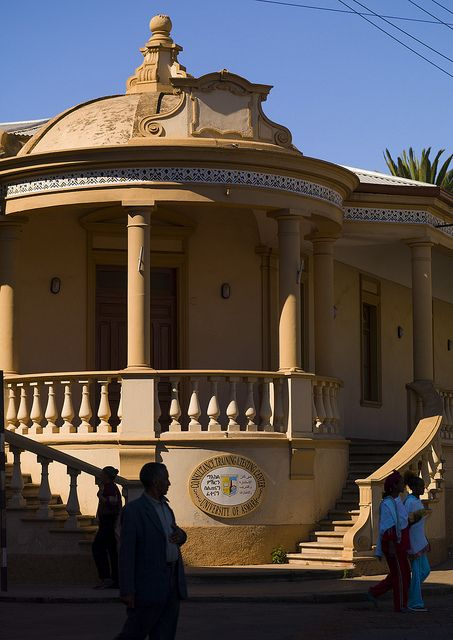
A building at the University of Asmara.

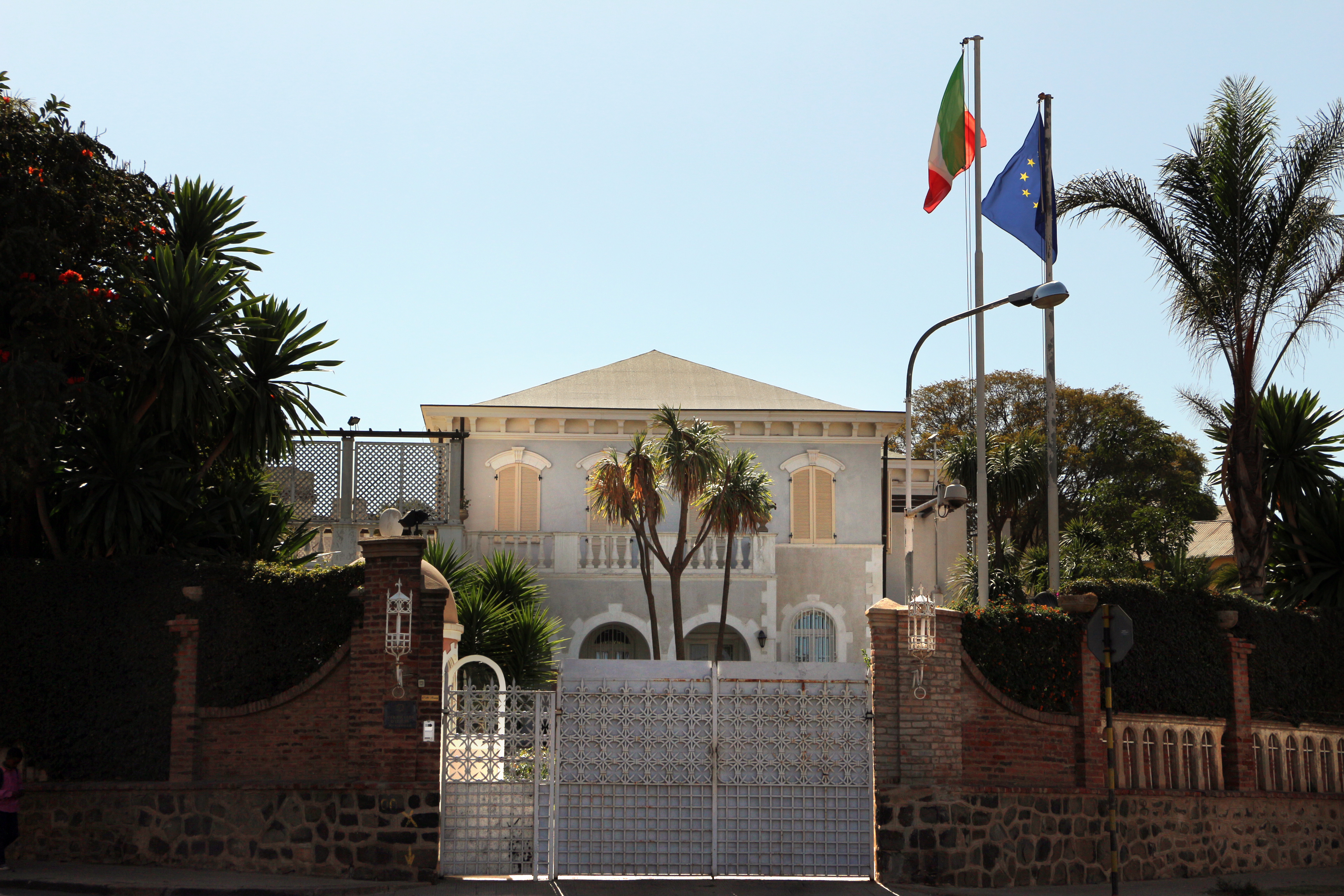
Villa Roma, Italian embassy.

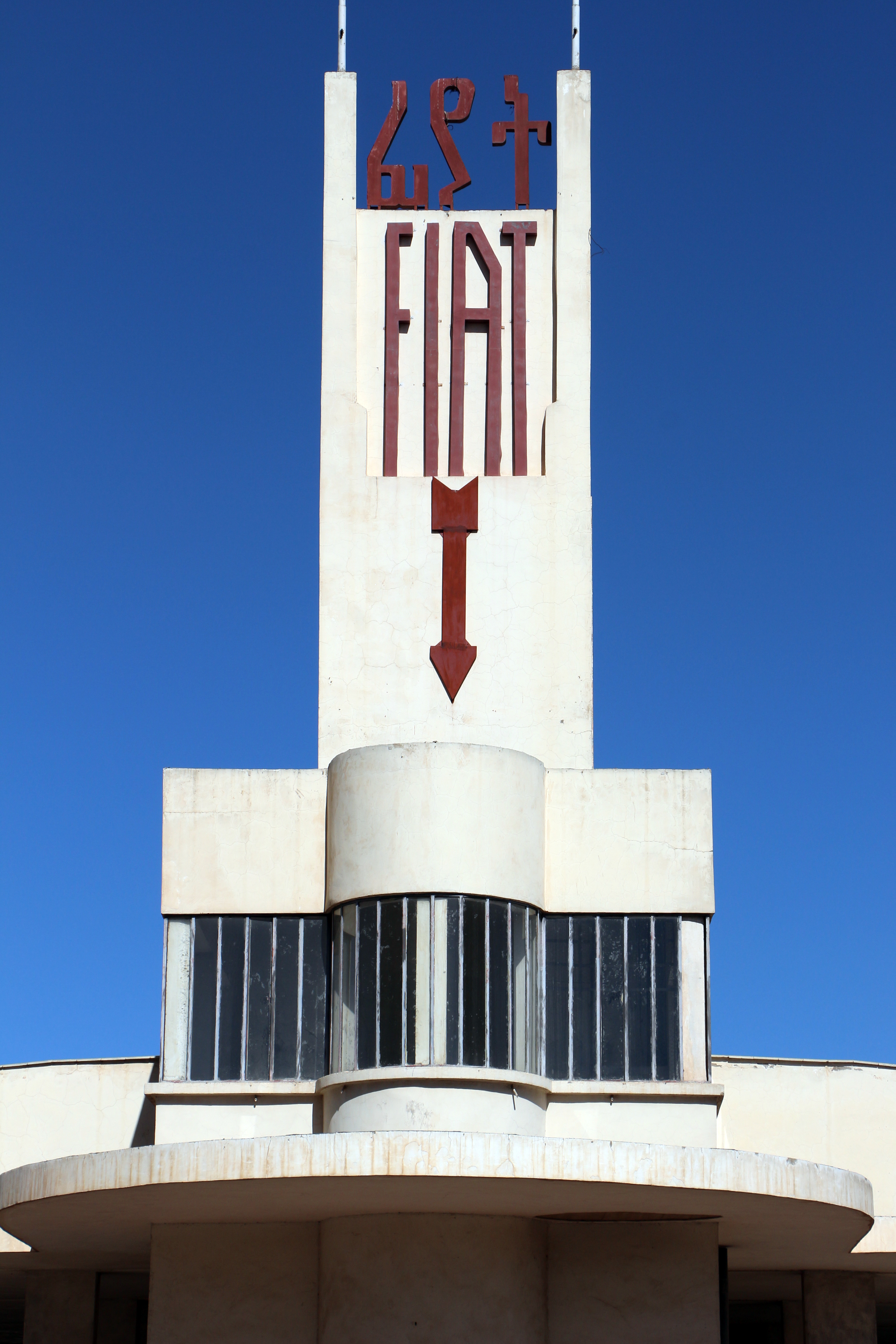
The Fiat Tagliero Building.

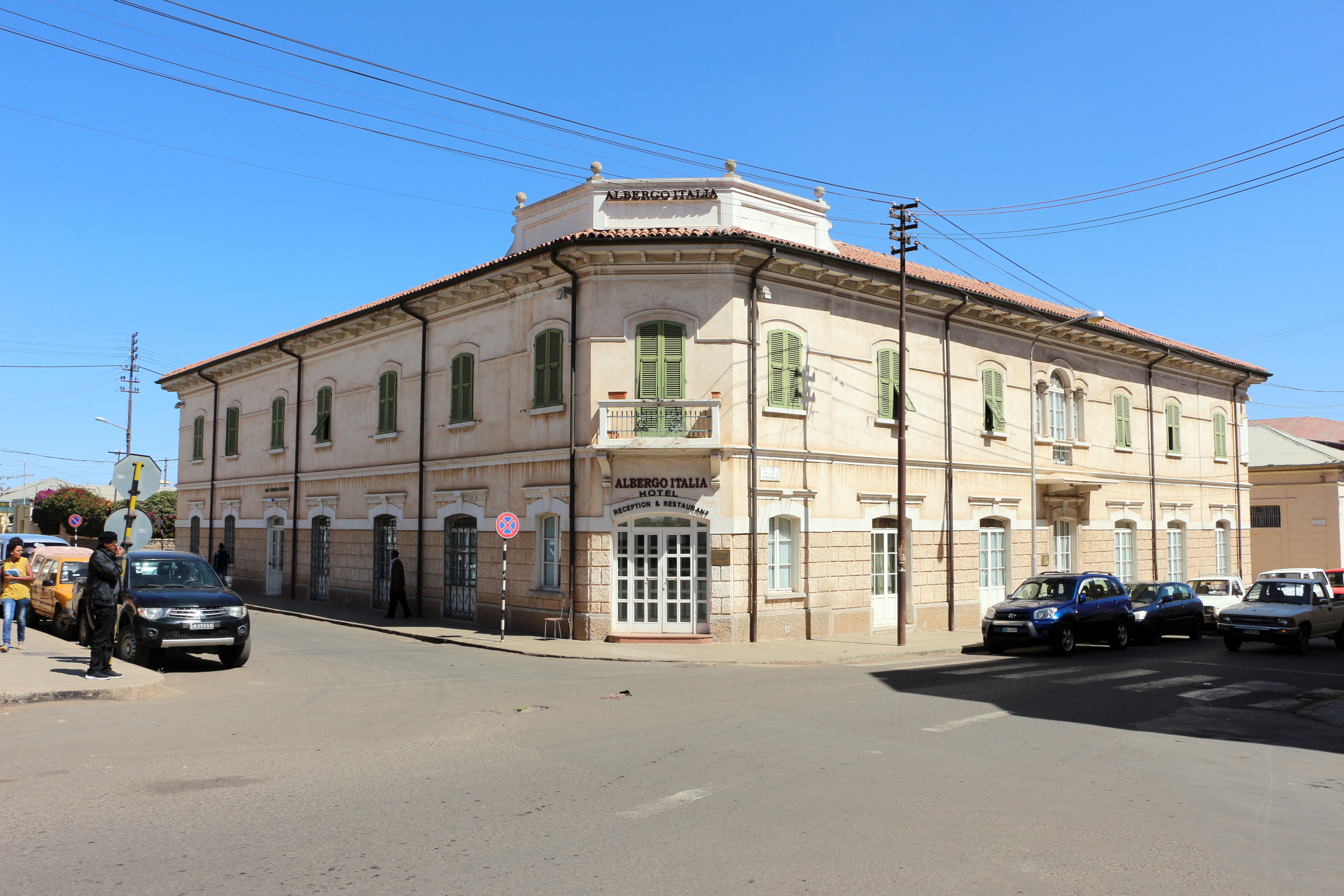
Hotel (Albergo) Italia, built 1889. The hotel is one of the oldest hotels in Asmara

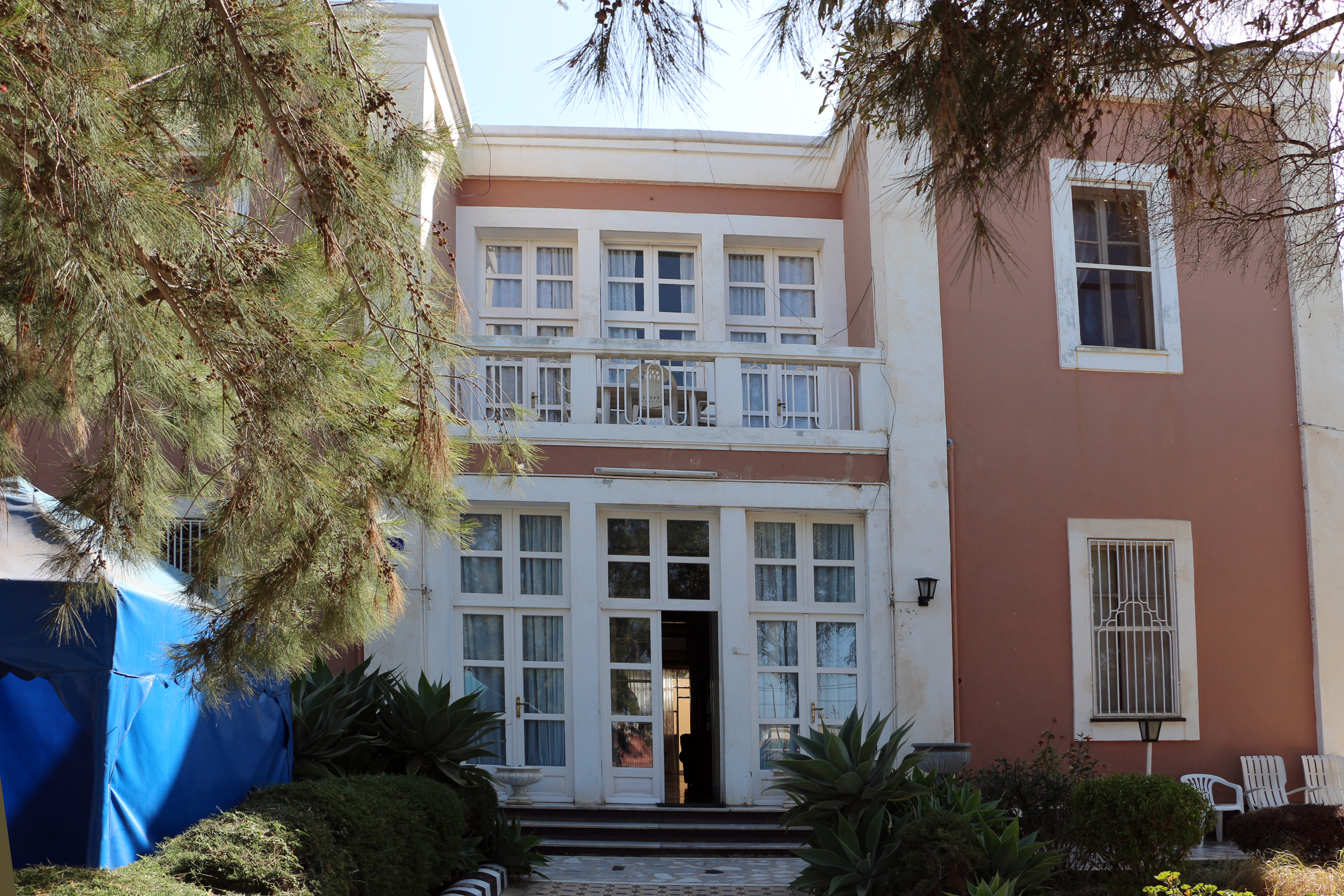
The African pension.

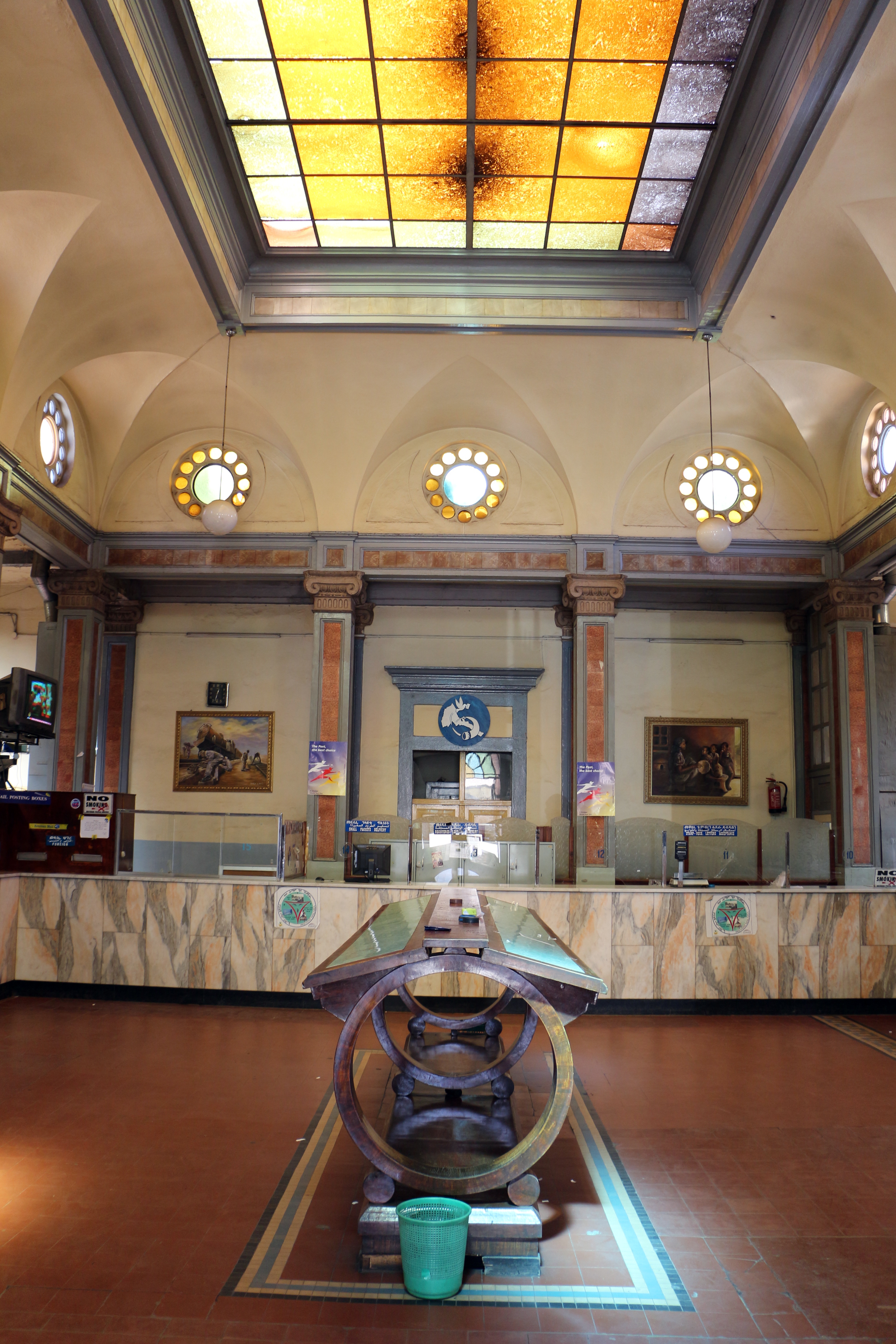
Interior of Asmara post office.

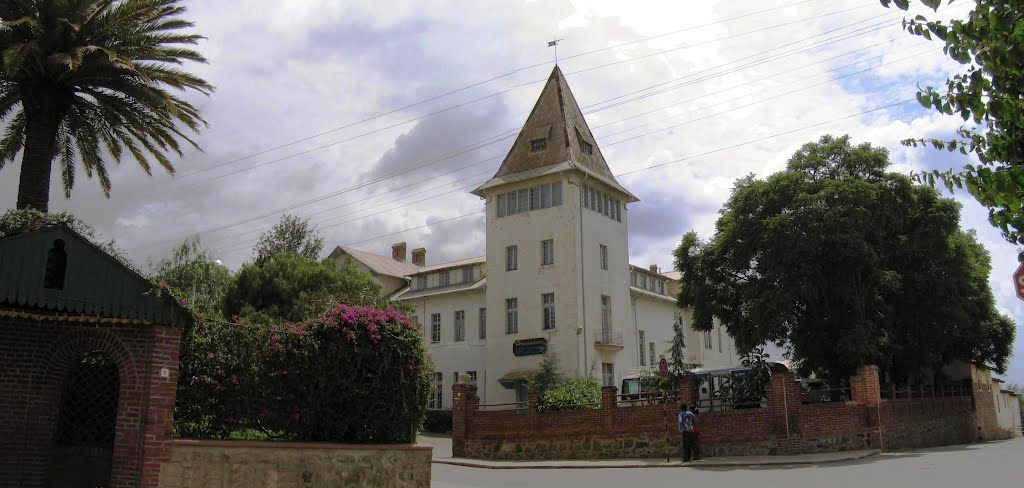
The Embasoira built 1919 (Old Imperial hotel), celebrated 100 years in 2019.

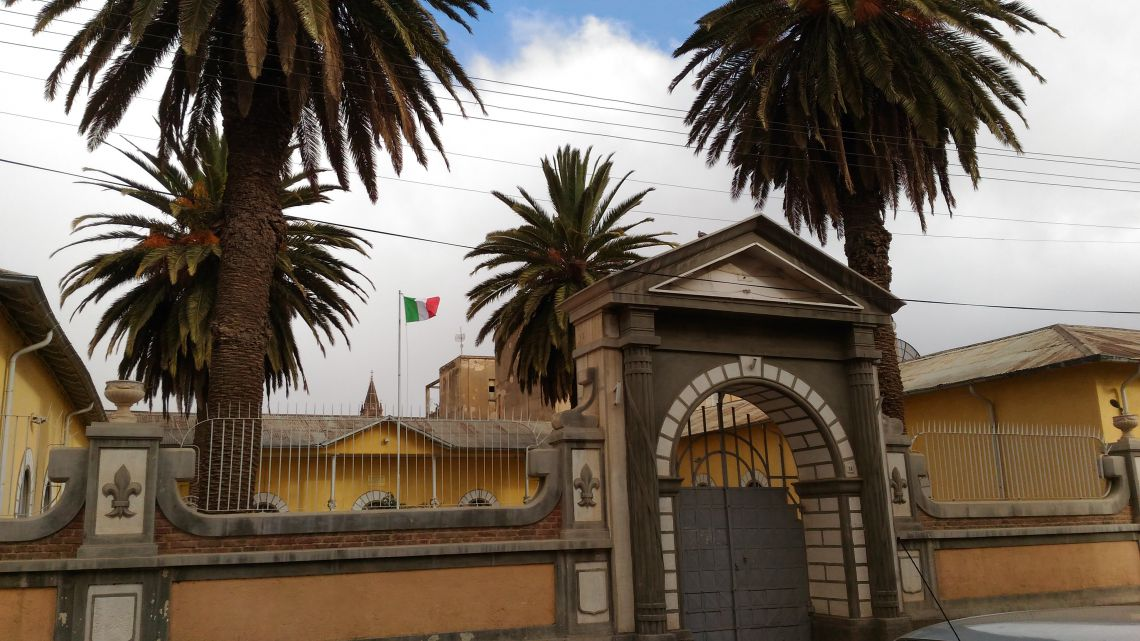
The Casa degli Italiani restaurant.

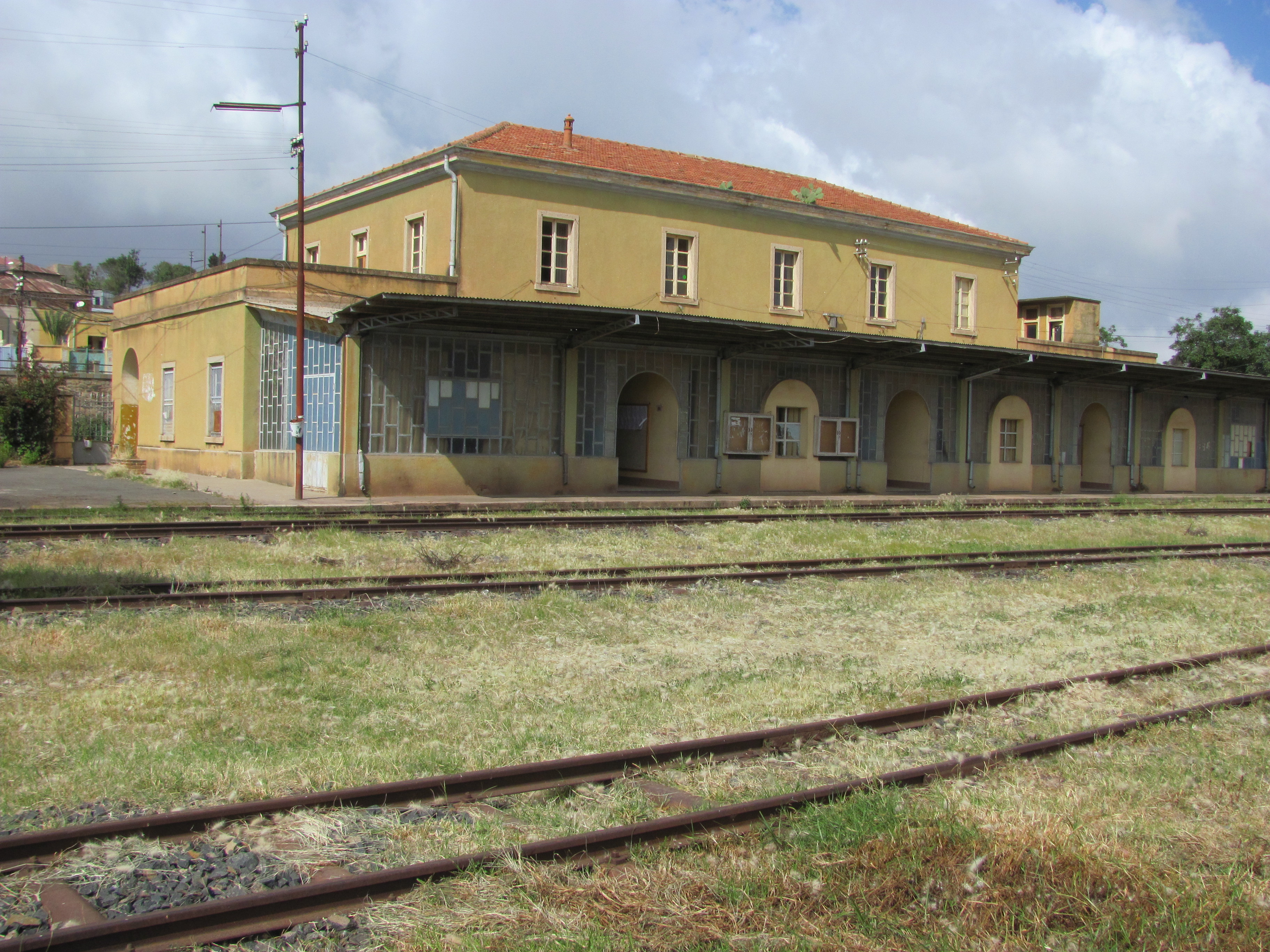
The railway station in Asmara.

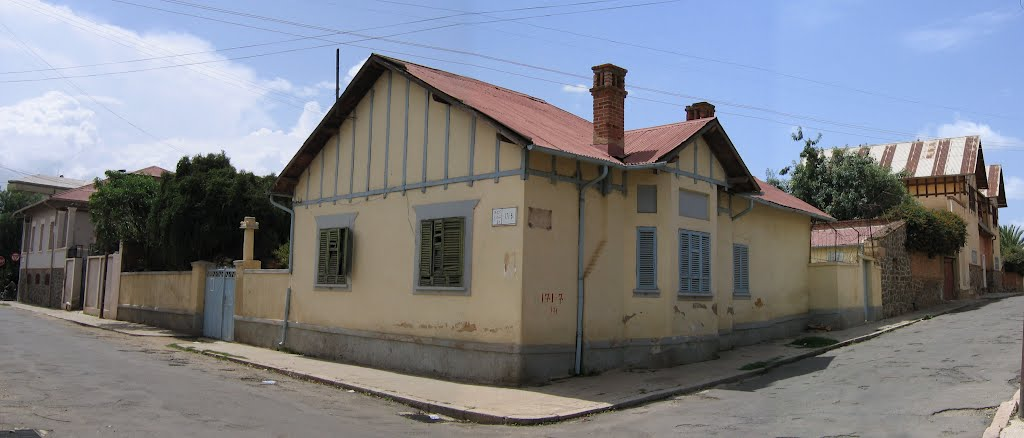
An old house in the European quarter.

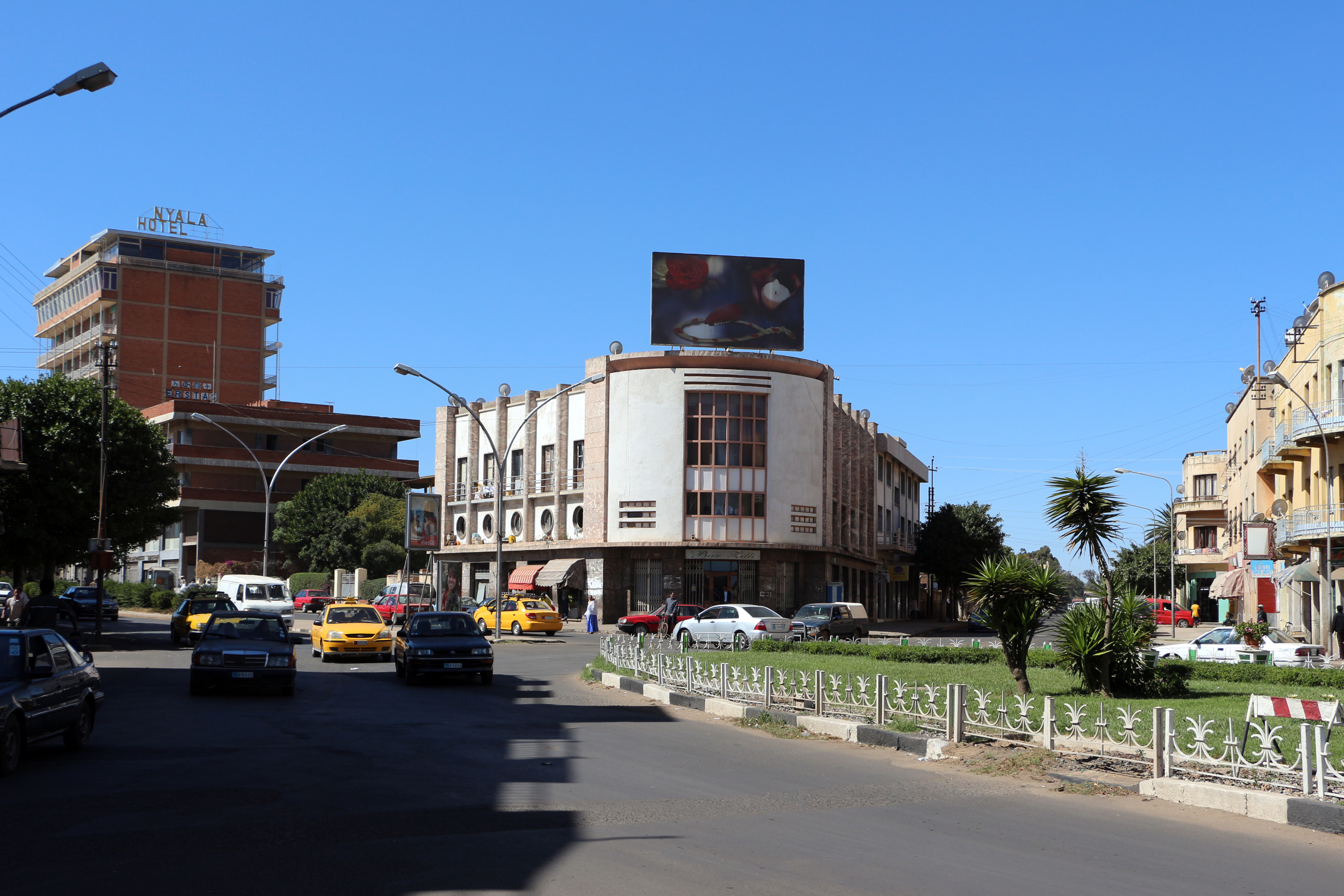
Bar Zilli, architecturally modeled in accordance with the Art Deco movement in the 1930s.

The Historic Center of Asmara was placed on the World Monuments Fund's 2006 Watch List of 100 Most Endangered Sites. The listing was designed to bring more attention to the city to save the center from decay and redevelopment and to promote restoration.

Following CARP (a World Bank initiative on Cultural Heritage), the European Union Delegation in Asmara has engaged into a Heritage Project pertaining to building's restoration and archive management. Launched in 2010 the EU/Eritrea Cultural Project was expected to be completed in 2014 (Pierre Couté – Edward Denison, Project Design Report, EUD Asmara 2009).

== Religion ==
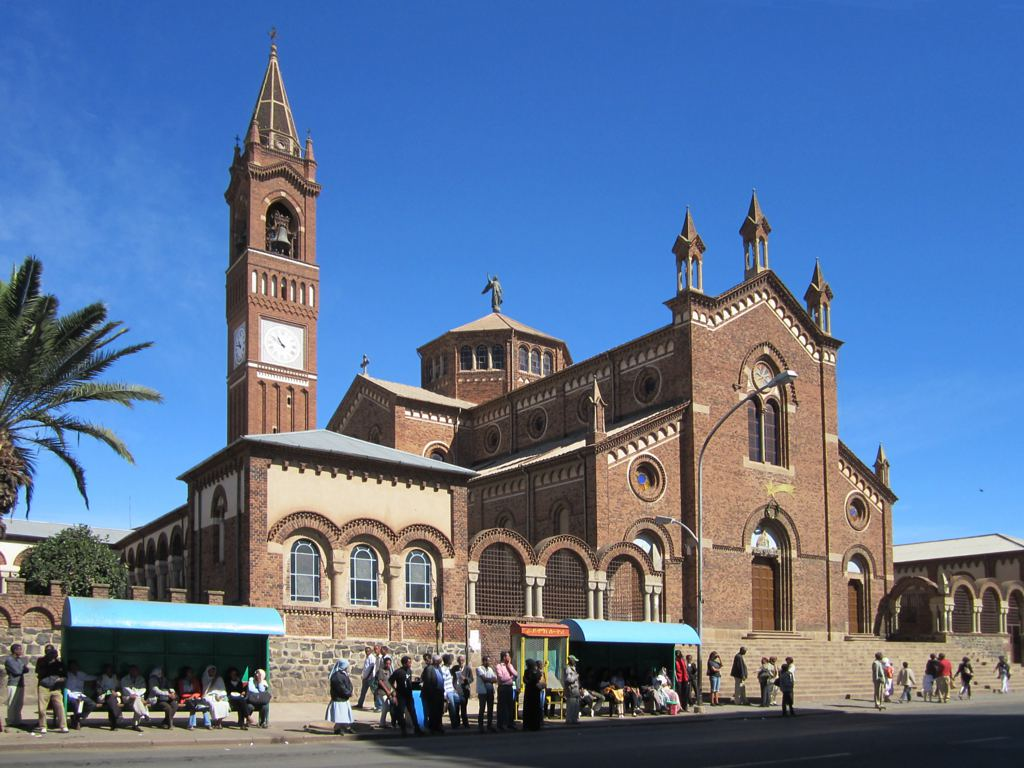
Church of Our Lady of the Rosary, Asmara

Four big landmarks of the city are the Church of Our Lady of the Rosary and the Kidane Mehret Cathedral of the Catholic faith (the former of Latin and the latter of Coptic rite), the Enda Mariam Cathedral of the Eritrean Orthodox Tewahedo Church, and the Al Khulafa Al Rashiudin Mosque of the Islamic faith. The population in the Central Region, which contains Asmara, is 89 percent Christian (almost 84 percent Orthodox, 4 percent Roman Catholic, and more than 1 percent Protestant) and 5 percent Muslim.

Asmara is also the see of the archbishop of the Eritrean Orthodox Tewahedo Church, which became autocephalous in 1993. The archbishop was elevated in 1998 to the rank of Patriarchate of Eritrea, on a par with the Ethiopian Orthodox Tewahedo Church.

== Economy ==
Eritrean Airlines, the Eritrean Telecommunications Corporation, and other companies are headquartered in the city. The country's national television station Eri-TV has many studios located in various areas in the capital.

Asmara Brewery, built in 1939 under the name of Melotti, is located in the city and employs 600 people. The brewery produces Asmara beer and other beverages like rum and gin. The brewery also owns and operates as a sponsor of the local football team Asmara Brewery FC, also named "Asmara Birra" (translated "Asmara Beer").

== Transport ==
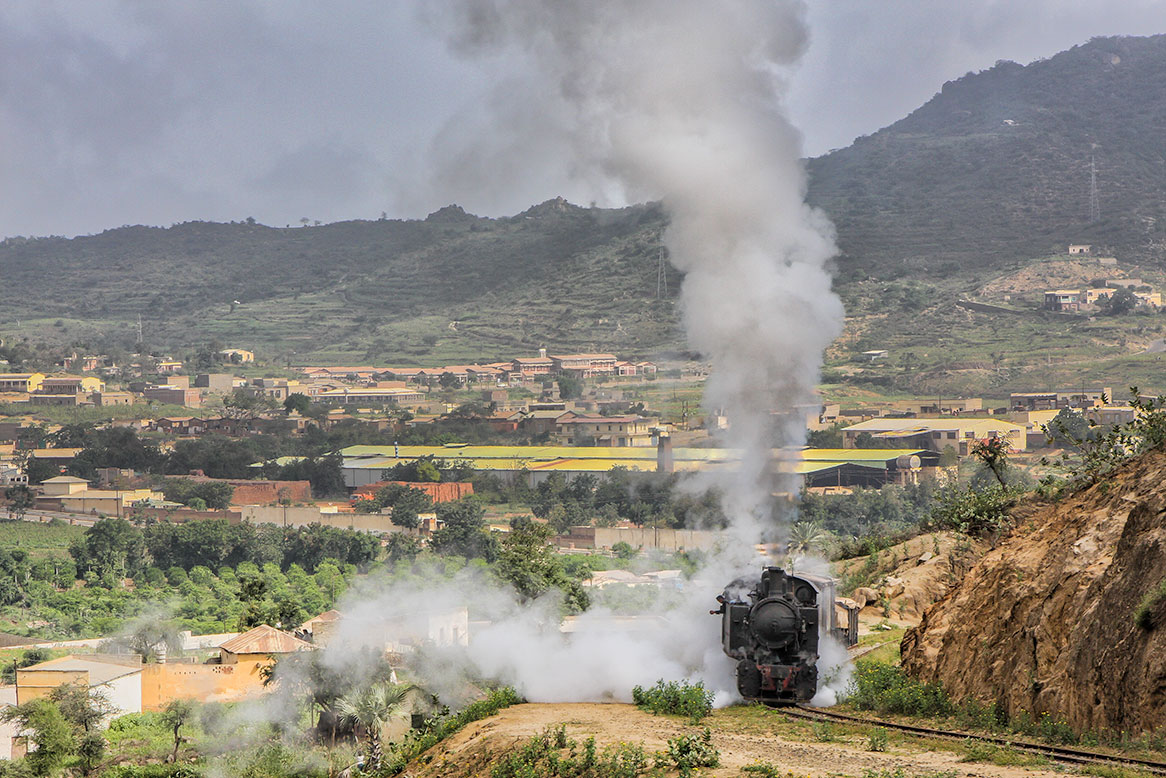
Steam train outside Asmara on the Eritrean Railway

After Eritrean independence, the roads of Asmara underwent extensive construction projects. Old roads were renovated and new highways were also built. There are five primary roads out of Asmara.

Asmara International Airport serves the city with many international flights. Massawa International Airport is an alternative airport nearby.

As of 1999, there is a total of 317 kilometres of 950 mm (3 ft 1 3/8 in) (narrow gauge) rail line in Eritrea. The Eritrean Railway was built between 1887 and 1932. Badly damaged during WWII and in later fighting, it was closed section by section, with the final closure coming in 1978. After independence, a rebuilding effort commenced, and the first rebuilt section was reopened in 2003. As of 2009, the section from Asmara to Massawa was fully rebuilt and available for service.

== Education ==
Asmara has always been a national centre of education, and is home to many elementary and high schools. It was home to the University of Asmara from 1958 until the university was shut down in 2006, following the opening of a university at Mai Nefhi. During the period of Ethiopian Federation and annexation, the university was also linked with what was then the nation's largest tertiary institution, Addis Ababa University.

=== Universities and colleges ===
- University of Asmara (1958-2006)
- Eritrea Institute of Technology

=== Primary and secondary schools ===
==== International schools ====
- Asmara International Community School – Anglophone international school
- Italian School of Asmara – Italian primary school with a Montessori department (1903-2020)

Secondary Schools

- Shek Ibrahim Sultan Secondary School
- Red sea Secondary School
- Barka Secondary School
- Limeat Secondary School
- Halay Secondary School
- Hafeshawi Secondary School
- Isaac Tewoldemedhn High School
- Semaetat Secondary School

== Districts ==
Asmara is divided into 13 districts or administrative areas. These districts are subdivided into North, North-West, North-East, South-East, South-West, East, West and Central areas. The thirteen districts (or Neous Zobas) are:

North

- Akhria District
- Abbashaul District
- Edaga Hamus District

North-East

- Arbaete Asmara District

North-West

- Mai Temenai District
- Paradiso District

South-West

- Sembel District

South-East

- Kahawuta District
- Godaif District

Central

- Maakel Ketema District

West

- Tiravolo District
- Tsetserat District

East

- Gheza Banda District
- Gejeret District

== Notable people ==
- Asmeret Asefaw Berhe, soil biogeochemist and Director of the Office of Science at the US Department of Energy
- Abraham Afewerki, popular singer, songwriter and music producer
- Beyene Haile, Eritrean writer, public administrator and founder of the Eritrean Center for Organizational Excellence
- Isaias Afwerki, President of Eritrea
- Tsehaytu Beraki, popular Eritrean musician
- Yemane Barya, famous Eritrean singer and musician
- Tedros Adhanom Ghebreyesus, 8th Director-General of the World Health Organization
- Remo Girone, Italian film and stage actor
- Biniam Girmay, Professional bicycle rider.
- Bruno Lauzi, Italian singer-songwriter, poet and writer
- Dawit Isaak, Swedish-Eritrean journalist
- Meb Keflezighi, Eritrean-born American long-distance runner
- Gianfranco Rosi, Italian film director and documentarian
- Mehari Shinash, Eritrean footballer
- Mussie Zerai, Roman Catholic priest and activist for the right of asylum

== See also ==
- CH-Star
