= University of Asmara =

University in Eritrea, (1958–2006)

- Type: Public
- Active: 1958–2006
- President: Tadesse Mehari
- Location: Asmara, Eritrea; 15°20′33″N 38°55′39″E
- Website: www.uoa.edu.er

The University of Asmara (UoA) was a public university in Asmara, Eritrea. The nation's first university, it was founded in 1958 by the "Piae Madres Nigritiae" (Comboni Sisters). It was meant to provide for the local population, though its initial enrollment in the 1950s was entirely Italian. Over the course of its history it has been reopened and reorganised following political changes. In 2006 it was closed and reorganized into other institutions such as the Eritrea Institute of Technology.

== History ==
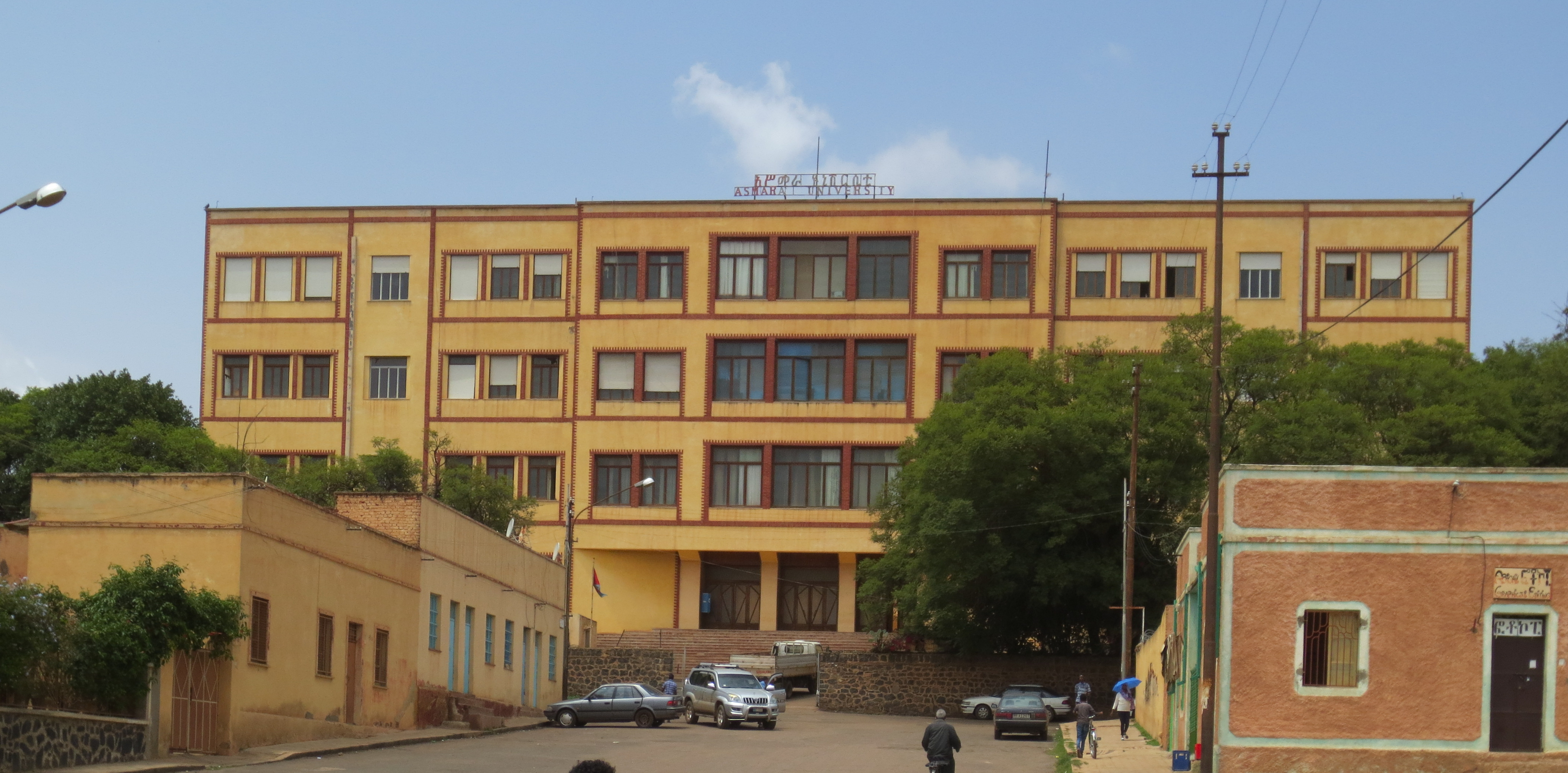
The faculty of Medicine in Asmara

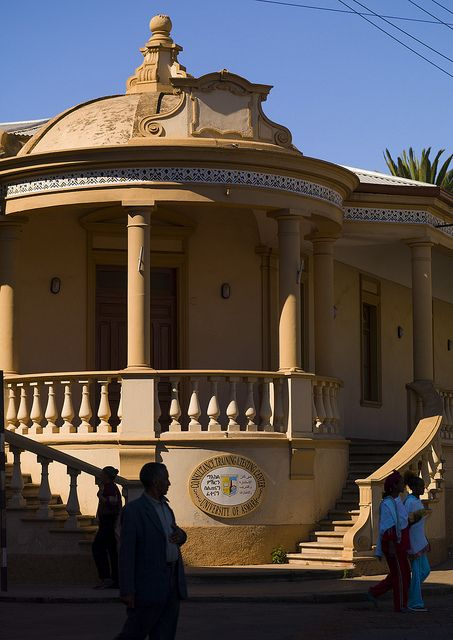

The university was founded as the "Catholic College of Santa Famiglia" in 1958 by the "Piae Madres Nigritiae" (Comboni Sisters). In 1964 the university had been renamed as "University of Asmara" and began offering Associate Diploma programs in the arts, commerce, and the sciences. The roots of the university are connected to the 1940s when Dr. Vincenzo Di Meglio promoted the creation of the "School of Medicine" in Italian Asmara. It is also linked historically to the Istituto Italiano Statale Omnicomprensivo di Asmara.

..it is noteworthy to remember that the "University of Asmara" was created by Italian religious organizations. Indeed The University of Asmara (UoA) was the nation's first university, and was founded in 1958 by the 'Piae Madres Nigritiae' (Comboni Sisters). The school was meant to provide for the local population, though its initial enrollment in the 1950s was entirely Italian. The university was founded with the name "Collegio Cattolico della Santa Famiglia": the roots were in the 1941 "Scuola di Medicina", linked to the Asmara Hospital (then named "Regina Elena"). In the early years, the curriculum reflected Italian educational plans, and courses were taught in Italian with a view to preparing students to receive the "laurea" (degree) from a university in Italy. In 1958, members of the missionary congregation 'Piae Madres Nigritiae' or Comboni Sisters began private education classes for 10 Italian female students: the "Holy Family University Institute" was founded by the Italian Sister Marianora and Sister Fosca. B. D'Ambrosio

In 1979 the new president pushed through a major reorganization of the curriculum and structure. The next years saw an increase in students from 300 to 2700. New courses, staff, day and evening extension programs and campus buildings revived the university, together with a bilateral agreement to exchange students and faculty with the University of Addis Ababa, particularly focusing on graduate training in Addis Ababa to produce faculty for Eritrea. In the 1980s, the Arid Zone Agricultural College was established as a faculty.

=== Closure ===
In 2001, students protested against the Ministry of Education's call for them to take leave during the rainy seasons, and to temporarily retrain as census workers in rural Eritrea. Between August and September in 2001, the conflict escalated and students suffered serious violence from the authorities. The university then began to refuse new admissions. As early as 2002, undergraduate programs were eliminated. Applications for admission were redirected to Eritrea Institute of Technology. Academic trips abroad were eliminated. During the 2005-2006 academic year, the university was not operational. The university closed its doors in 2007, after graduating its last class.

Other sources claim that the closure of the university is linked to the fact that it centralized and monopolized all higher education programs in the country, which prevented a diversified development of the Eritrean education sector. After the final closure of admission in 2003, seven higher education institutions inherited the accreditations of the University of Asmara.

== See also ==
- Education in Eritrea

== Bibliography ==
- Killion, Tom (1998). Historical Dictionary of Eritrea. The Scarecrow Press. ISBN 0-8108-3437-5.
- Feagles, Shelley M. (1999). A Guide to Educational Systems Around the World. Washington, D.C.: NAFSA: Association of International Educators. ISBN 9780912207834.
