= Mai Nefhi =

Coordinates: 15.2523°N 38.7838°E

Mai Nefhi (Tigrigna for "Water-Distend?") is both a location near Asmara, Eritrea and the dam after which it was named. The Mai Nefhi dam was completed in 1970, during the reign of Haile Selassie, and remains the main water source for Asmara.

Abardae, a historical town with a population of 3,000 residents is located nearby. Eritrea Institute of Technology, the only technical college in the country is located 500m away from Abardae-Mai Nefhi.
