= Mehari (name) =

Mehari (Amharic: መሀሪ (mehārī) or መሐሪ (meḥārī), its literal meaning in the Amharic-language being "merciful", "forgiving") is a male given name of Ethiopian and Eritrean origin which like all Ethiopian male given names can also be used as a surname and may refer to:

== Surname ==
- Enawgaw Mehari (born 1960), Ethiopian-American neurologist, global health advocate, philanthropist, humanitarian, and medical educator
- Mizan Mehari (1980–2007), Ethiopian-born Australian athlete
- Rehaset Mehari (born 1989), Eritrean long-distance runner
- Senait Ghebrehiwet Mehari (born 1974), Eritrean-born German singer

== Given name ==
- Mehari Shinash (born 198?), Eritrean footballer
