= SAWA Defence Training Center =

Military training center in Eritrea

Coordinates: 15°41′56.00″N 36°58′25.32″E

The SAWA Defence Training Center is a military academy in the Gash-Barka region of Eritrea. It is where the Eritrean Defence Forces (EDF) recruits, and national service conscripts are sent for basic military training. Since 2003, all local secondary school pupils have been required to attend their 12th grade at an institution proximate to the SAWA center in order ensure that they meet their mandatory national service obligations.

In August 2019, Human Rights Watch reported that the students have been fleeing from the country to avoid training at the Sawa camps, where they are subjected to systematic abuse, torture, harsh working conditions and punishments, and also paid insufficiently.

== See also ==
- Education in Eritrea
