= Asmara International Community School =

Location
- Asmara; Eritrea

Information
- Type: Independent, coeducational day school
- Established: 1994

The Asmara International Community School (AICS) in Asmara, Eritrea, is an independent, coeducational day school which offers an educational program to children from prekindergarten (age 3) through grade 12. The school was founded in 1994 to serve the needs of the international community and other students seeking English-language education.

== Organization ==
The school is governed by a seven-member board of governors. Five of the board members are elected by the AICS Parents’ Association. Two board members are appointed, one by the U.S. Embassy and one from the United Nations. The school closed 4 years ago, in 2020

== Curriculum ==
The curriculum is similar to that of other international schools. The Early Childhood Classroom (PK and KG) uses the International Primary curriculum, as does Grades 1–6. Grades 7 and 8 use the International Middle Years curriculum. Starting in Grade 7, the Secondary School is departmentalized by core subject: English, mathematics, science, and social studies. In addition to the regular academic courses, there are specialist teachers for music, computer, art and physical education are offered at all grade levels. Classes in French are also offered. Starting from school year 2019-2020 the school is authorized to offer IB programme leading to the IB diploma.

== Facilities ==
The school consists of a brick building with 12 large classrooms and four small classrooms. It has a library for supplemental reading and research. The school has an auditorium attached to the building for use in drama productions and other large group gathering events. The auditorium also occasionally also doubles as a gym for special sports events. There are grounds with area to play as well as playground equipment, basketball court, and soccer pitch. However, both the basketball court and the soccer pitch are entirely concrete.

== See also ==
- Italian School of Asmara – Italian primary and Montessori school in Asmara
- Istituto Italiano Statale Comprensivo (IT) – Italian international elementary and junior high school in Asmara
- Liceo Sperimentale "G. Marconi" – Italian international senior high school in Asmara
- List of international schools

== Sources ==
This article has been adapted from information released by the US State Department's Office of Overseas Schools on November 10, 2020, a public domain source.
