= Bar Zilli =

Bar Zilli (ባር ዚሊ)
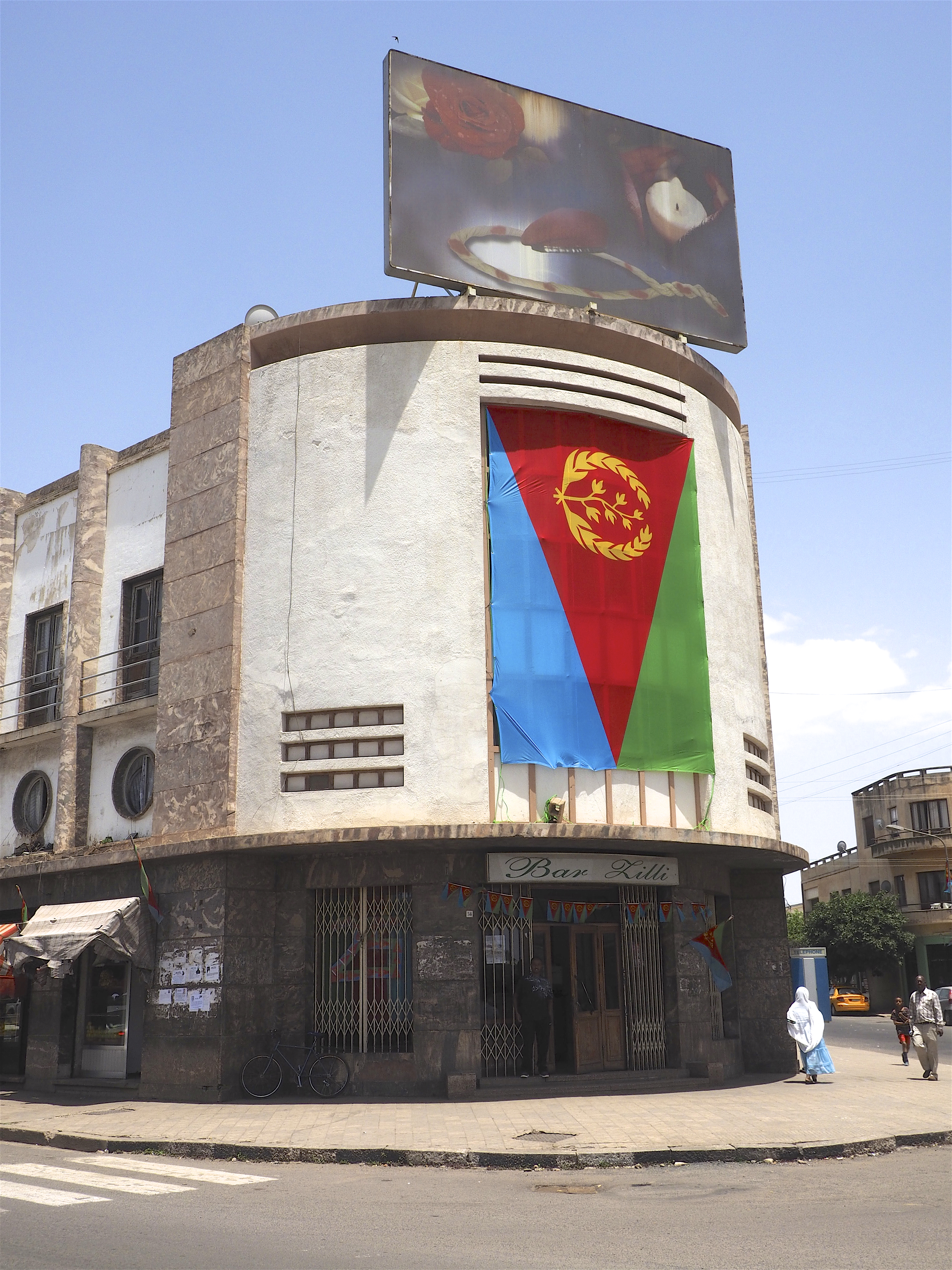
- Bar Zilli
- Interactive map of Bar Zilli (ባር ዚሊ)

Restaurant information
- Established: 1930; 96 years ago
- Food type: Eritrean cuisine
- Location: Sematat St. & Beirut, Asmara, Eritrea
- Coordinates: 15.3317°N 38.9295°E

Bar Zilli is a building located in central Asmara, Eritrea. Currently, it operates as a restaurant and it serves as a commonly identifiable landmark to Asmara residents.

== History ==
Bar Zilli was built during the late stages of Italian colonial rule and was architecturally modeled according to the art style of Art Deco.

== Architecture ==
Bar Zilli is an easily-recognizable building that was featured in a Fodor's Architectural publication. The architecture is described as featuring a "curved façade with a mix of central vertical windows and small horizontal strips at the corners are the reasons why experts have called this structure “idiosyncratic” and “distinctive.”

According to a New York Times article written in 2017," The Bar Zilli building looks like an old-fashioned radio set, with windows like tuning buttons."

Bar Zilli Gallery
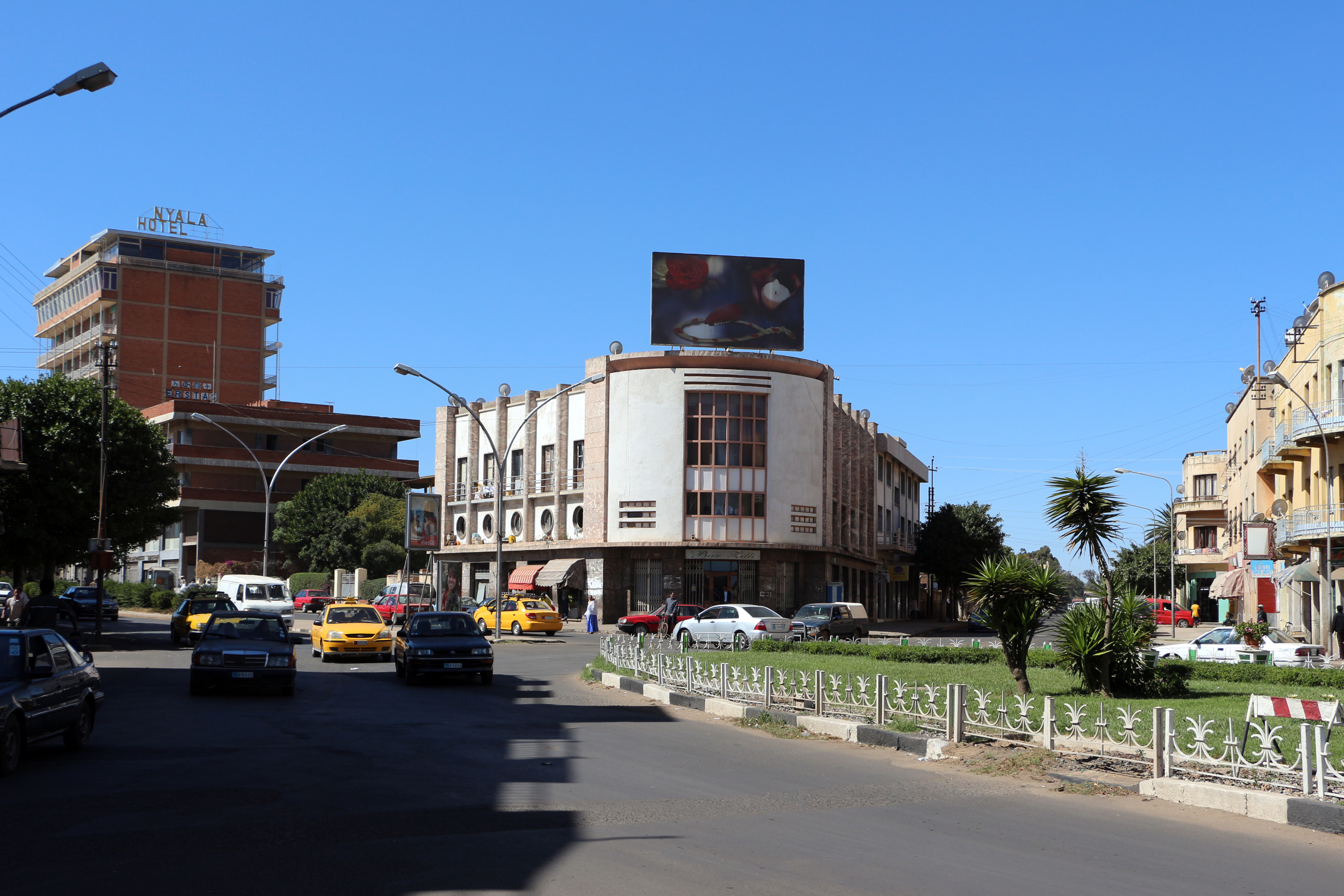
Bar Zilli stands as a symbol of Asmara's distinctive city design. As recognized by UNESCOWorld Heritage Site.

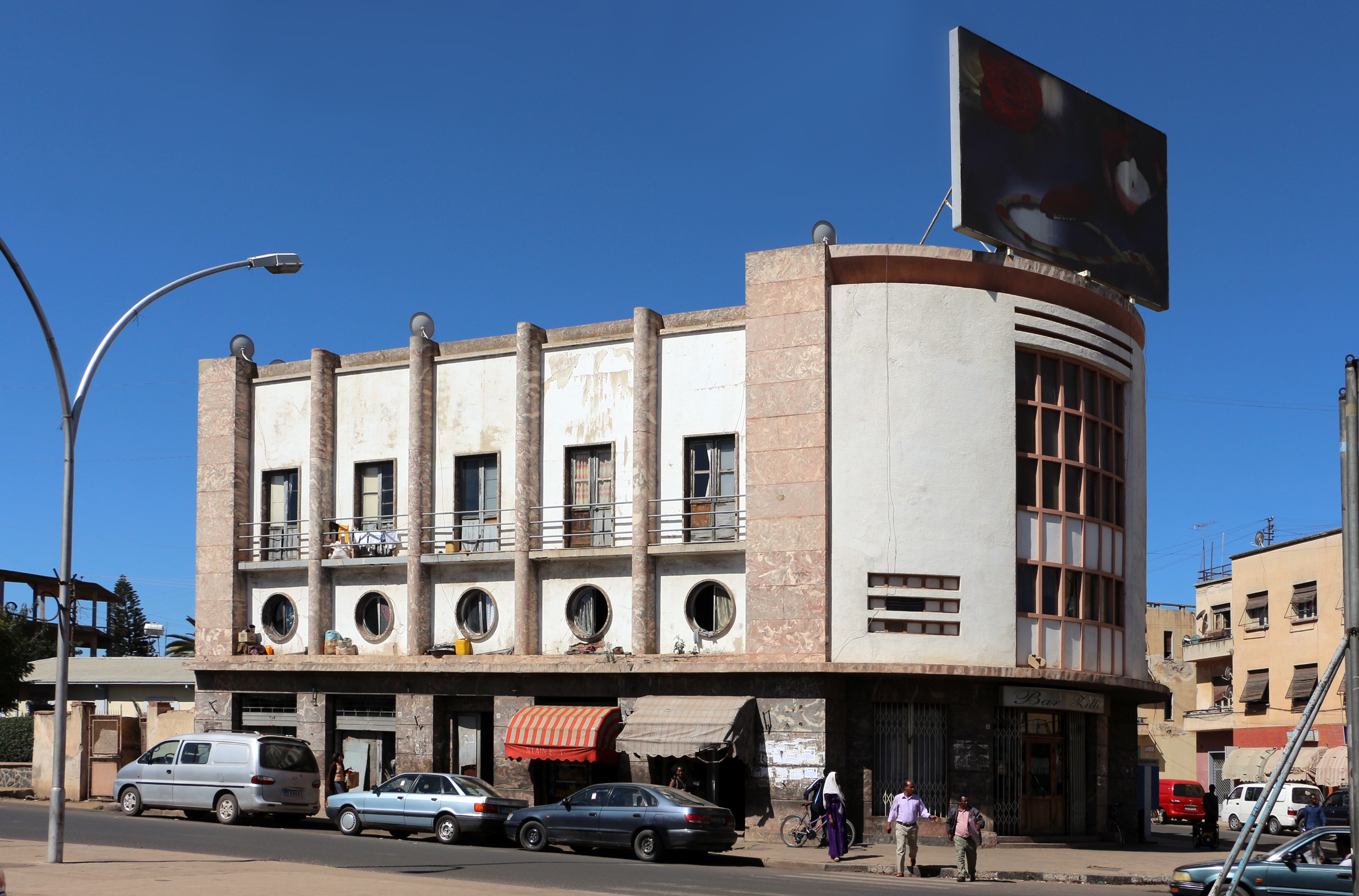
Side profile of Bar Zilli.
