= World Bank Building, Asmara =

Building in Eritrea

The World Bank Building of Asmara, Eritrea is a large Italian villa built in 1938 which was bought by the World Bank to house its headquarters in that country. The architecture of the building is a mixture of futurist and art deco architectural styles.

== Sources ==
- Asmara: The Frozen City, Jochen Visscher and Stefan Boness (Jovis, 2007)
