= Buonarroti =

Buonarroti (Buonarotti) is a surname, and may refer to

- Michelangelo Buonarroti (1475–1564), the Italian artist known as Michelangelo
- Filippo Buonarroti (1661–1733), Florentine official and grandnephew of Michelangelo
- John Buonarotti Papworth (1775–1847), British prolific architect and artist
- Philippe Buonarroti (1761–1837), Italian revolutionary writer
