= Mussie Zerai =

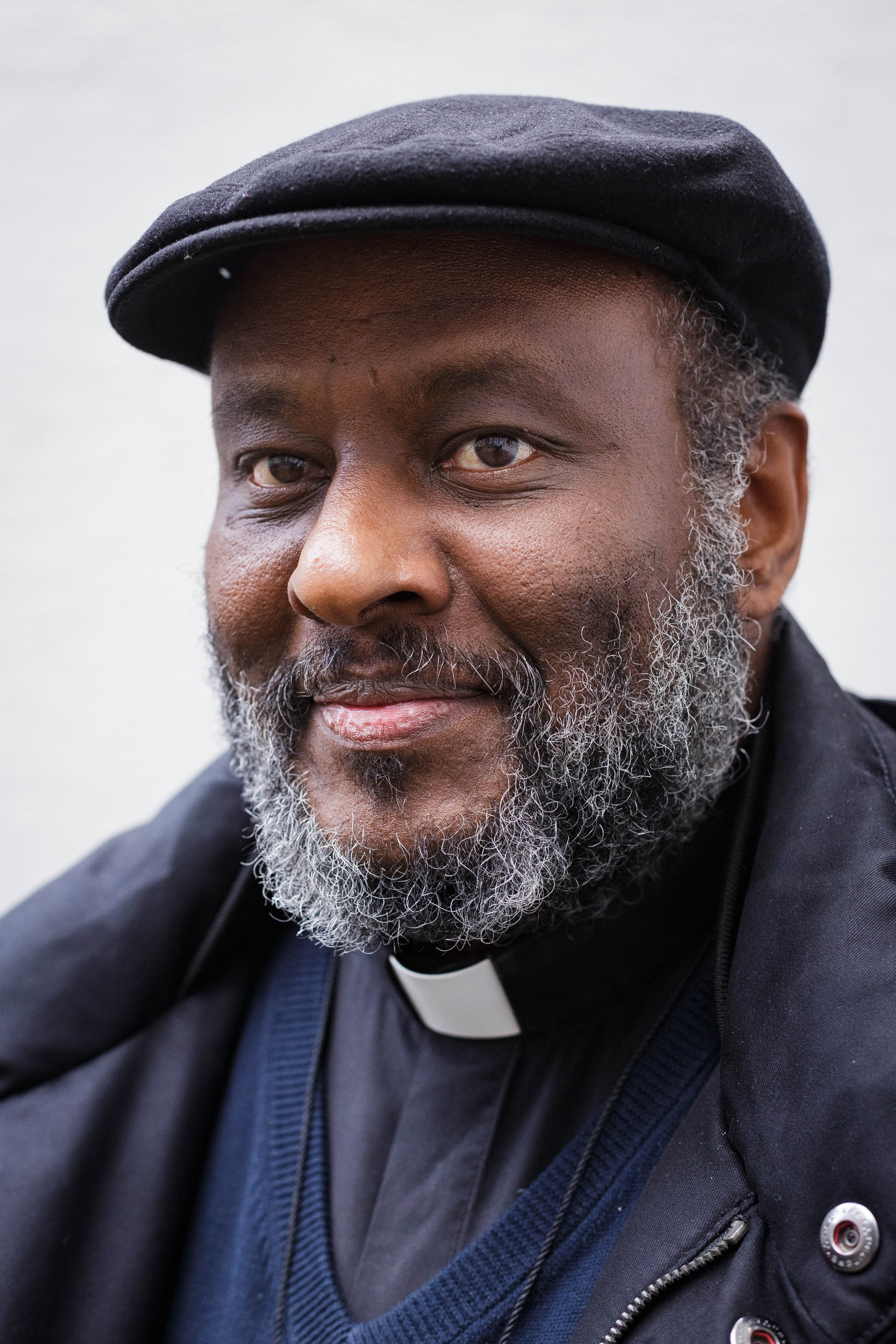

Mussie Zerai Yosief, also known as Dr. Abba Mussie Zerai Yosief, Mosè Zerai and Dr. Father Moses, (born 1975), is an Eritrean Catholic priest known for his work with asylum seekers & refugees crossing the Mediterranean Sea from North Africa to Europe during the European Asylum seekers crisis.

== Biography ==
Born in Asmara, Zerai grew up with seven siblings and was raised by his grandmother; his mother died when he was five and his father, who at one point was arrested by the Secret Police, fled the country to Italy. At age seventeen, Zerai traveled to Rome where he applied for asylum and with the aid of a British priest, obtained a residence permit.

His first years in Italy were spent sorting newspapers and working on a fruit stand, while helping his priest as a translator and assistant, especially supporting immigrants & refugees to obtain identification, residency permits, health cards, pensions, and tax registration.

For three years he studied with the Scalabrinian Missionaries in Piacenza, returning to Rome in 2003 to study theology and work for the organization there. In 2006, Zerai co-founded Agenzia Habeshia, an organization which works to pursue the interest of asylum seekers and refugees.

He was ordained a priest in 2010. After 2011, Zerai lived in Switzerland where he was a priest for the Eritrean and Ethiopian communities. He was first placed in Fribourg and later in Erlinsbach. In 2014, he was elected European coordinator for Eritrean Catholics and their chaplains.

In 2018, he returned to Rome to carry out the task of European coordinator and prepare the way for the appointment of the apostolic visitor for the faithful of the géèz rite in Europe, the USA and Canada. In 2022, he was assigned to carry out pastoral service for the Italian missions in Montreal in Canada.

== Awards ==
- Giardino dei Giusti di tutto il mondo al Monte Stella - Milano https://it.gariwo.net/giornata-dei-giusti/giornata-dei-giusti-2023-25636.html
- Premio per la Cultura Mediterranea 2017 https://www.fondazionecarical.it/iniziative-della-fondazione/premio-per-la-cultura-mediterranea/xi-edizione-premio-per-la-cultura-mediterranea/
- Terra Justa - Fafe Portugal April 2016, https://static.cm-fafe.pt/camara-municipal-fafe/296/236385/terra-justa-programa-2016.pdf
- Golden Doves for Peace - Rome Italy, June 2016, https://archiviodisarmo.it/premio-colombe-d-oro-per-la-pace.html
- The 100 Most Influential People, TIME, April 2016, https://time.com/collection-post/4302419/mussie-zerai-2016-time-100/
- ProAsyl award for Human Right, September 2016, http://www.proasyl.de/pressemitteilung/pro-asyl-menschenrechtspreis-geht-an-father-mussie-zerai/
- CRANS Montana Forum award for Peace and Human Dignity, October 2016 https://www.cmf.ch/index.php?page=16
- Mundo Negro at la Fraternidad 2017 Spain http://mundonegro.es/helena-maleno-y-mussie-zerai-estamos-cediendo-nuestra-libertad-a-cambio-de-seguridad/
- One Young World Counsellor Father Mussie Zerai is a Nobel Peace Prize nominee https://www.oneyoungworld.com/counsellors/father-mussie-zerai https://www.oneyoungworld.com/news-item/one-young-world-counsellor-father-mussie-zerai-nobel-peace-prize-nominee
- The Peace Research Institute Oslo nominated Zerai for the 2015 Nobel Peace Prize.
- Honorary PHD 2020 Luzern University of Switzerland https://www.unilu.ch/universitaet/dienste/universitaetskommunikation/medienmitteilungen/fakultaeten-und-departement-verleihen-fuenf-ehrendoktorate-5481/
