= Istituto Italiano Statale Omnicomprensivo di Asmara =

Italian School of Asmara
- Asmara; Eritrea

Information
- School type: Public international school
- Established: 1935 (91 years ago)
- Closed: 2020 (6 years ago)
- Language: Italian
- Website: scuoleasmara.it

The Italian School of Asmara (officially Istituto italiano statale omnicomprensivo di Asmara - Scuola italiana di Asmara) was a government-operated Italian international school located in Asmara, the capital of Eritrea. The school closed in 2020.

== History ==
In 1903, two Italian schools were founded, each with an Italian instructor, to serve the growing Italian colonial population, in Asmara and Keren. The school in Keren later closed. The Asmara school originally served only preschool and grades one to five, but in 1957 added the Scuola dell'Infanzia Montessori, which served ages three to five.

In 1975, the school ceased most operations due to the breakout of the Eritrean War of Independence, and most of the Italian community left. By 1990, the Montessori preschool school grew to three teachers and four classes.

In 2000, Italy recognised the school, arranging an agreement that the school be accessible to all temporary expatriate families for low cost.

In 2012, the Italian and Eritrean governments agree to jointly manage the school, which had been owned by Italy and run as a private school.

As of 2015, 550 students attended the school.

The school closed in 2020.

== Divisions ==
There were three divisions:

- A preschool, Scuola dell'infanzia italiana "Maria Montessori"
- A combined elementary and junior high school, Istituto italiano comprensivo di Asmara).
  - Scuola Elementare "Buonarroti"
  - Scuola media "A. Volta"
- Liceo Sperimentale "G. Marconi" or the Liceo italiano di Asmara ([liˈtʃɛːo marˈkoːni])

The high school started operations in the 1935–1936 school year. It started as the Martini four-year state scientific senior high school. It was temporarily converted to a classical high school in the 1937–1937 school year but it reverted to its scientific high school status in the 1955–1956 school year. It became a five-year school in the 1986–1987 school year through a resolution of the academic board and the approval of the Italian Ministry of Foreign Affairs (MAE).

As of 2015, 85% of the high school's 330 students were Eritreans, with other nationalities making up the remainder. Previously, its students were almost entirely expatriate Italians.

== Demographics ==
When the school was founded in 1903 it almost wholly served the children of Italian nationals. Following World War II, the number of native Eritrean students steadily increased. In the 1956–57 school year, Eritrean students made up 17% of the student body, with Italians making up 83%. As of 2015, native students represented 84% of the school, Italians or other Europeans 14%, and children of temporary expatriate workers, as per the Italian agreement with the school, made up 2%. The preschool was 80% Eritrean and 20% Italian or other European.

== See also ==
- Asmara International Community School – English-language international school
- List of international schools
