= Eritrea Institute of Technology =

Technological institute in Eritrea

- Type: Public
- Established: 2003; 23 years ago
- President: Ghebrehiwet Medhanie
- Location: Abardae, Eritrea; 15.2430°N 38.7750°E
- Website: eit.edu.er

The Eritrea Institute of Technology (EIT) is a technological university located in Mai Nefhi, Eritrea. It is situated about 12 km (7.5 mi) southwest of Asmara, near the Mai Nefhi dam. The institute has three colleges: Science, Engineering and Technology, and Education. The institute began with about 5,500 students during the 2003-2004 academic year.

== Overview ==
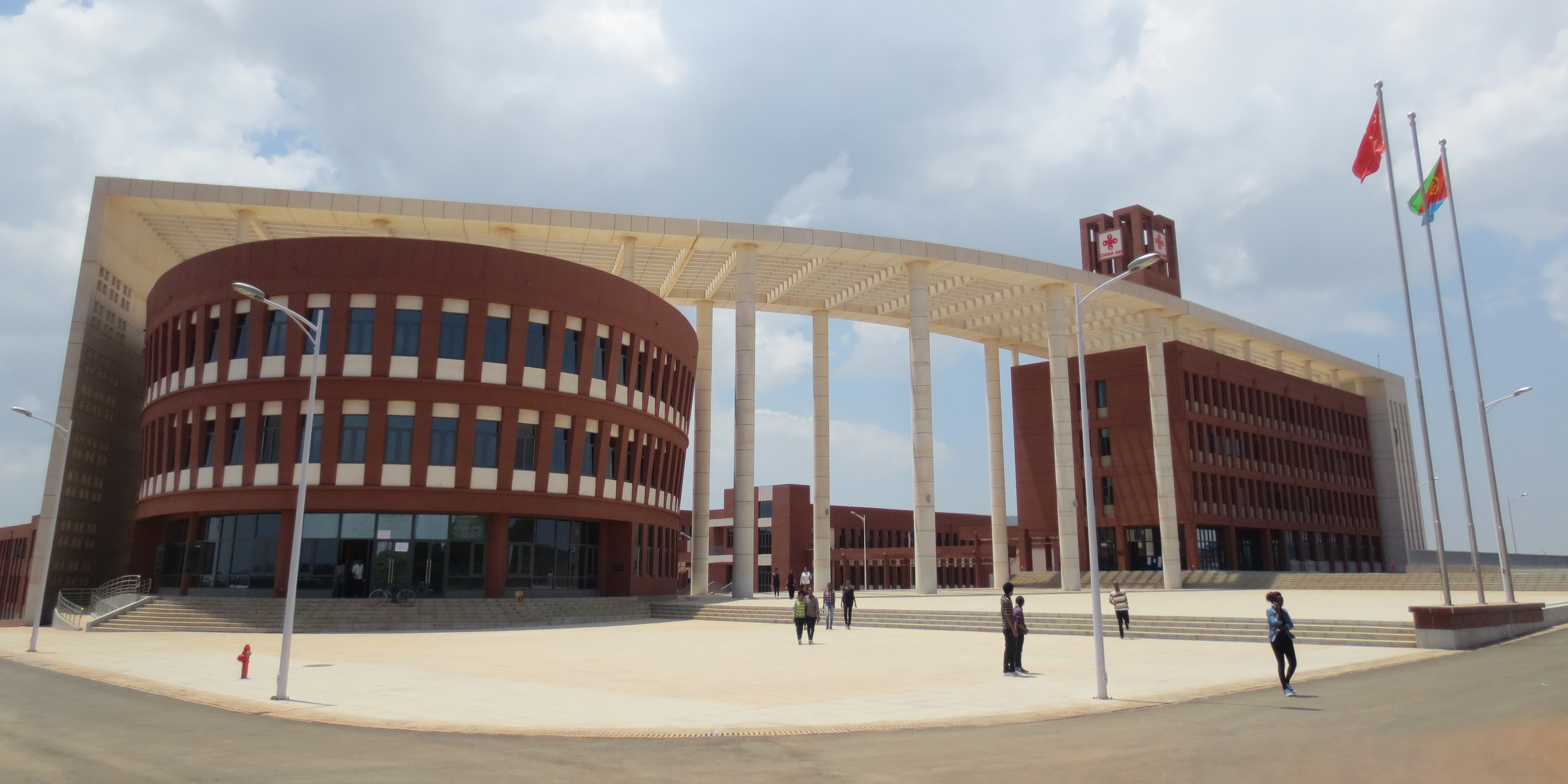
The Eritrea Institute of Technology

The EIT was opened after the University of Asmara was reorganized. According to the Ministry of Education, the institution was established, as one of many efforts to achieve equal distribution of higher learning in areas outside the capital city, Asmara. Accordingly, several similar colleges are also established in different other parts of the country.

The Eritrea Institute of Technology at Mai Nefhi is the main local institute of higher studies in science, engineering and education. Funding for EIT is largely provided by the Ministry of Education.
