= Mehari Shinash =

Eritrean footballer

Mehari Shinash is an Eritrean footballer. He played for the Eritrean national football team.

== International career ==
Shinash played in the 2009 CECAFA Cup in Kenya, where his cross was deflected in for an own goal in the 3–1 victory against Somalia.

== Personal life ==
He was born in Asmara Eritrea . Whilst competing in the 2009 CECAFA Cup in Kenya he was part of the Eritrea national football team which failed to return home after competing in the regional tournament in Nairobi. After receiving refugee status from the Australian government, the team moved to Adelaide, Australia.
