= List of Eritreans =

The following is a list of notable Eritreans.

== Actors and actresses ==
- Aida Osman
- Azie Tesfai
- Ella Thomas
- Mereb Estifanos
- Tiffany Haddish
- Zeudi Araya

== Artists ==
- Abdulkadir Kebire
- Aron Mehzion
- Dawit Isaak
- Fesshaye Yohannes
- Genet Sium
- Hamid Barole Abdu
- Hannah Pool
- Michael Adonai
- Osman Saleh Sabbe
- Ruth Simon
- Saba Kidane
- Yegizaw Michael

== Athletes ==
- Alexander Isak
- Amanuel Ghebreigzabhier
- Berhane Aregai
- Biniam Girmay
- Daniel Teklehaimanot
- Ghirmay Ghebreslassie
- Golgol Mebrahtu
- Hennos Asmelash
- Henok Goitom
- Jemal Abdu
- Joel Gerezgiher
- Meb Keflezighi
- Mekseb Debesay
- Merhawi Kudus
- Mossana Debesai
- Nat Berhe
- Natnael Berhane
- Nebiat Habtemariam
- Oliver Kylington
- Shannon-Ogbnai Abeda
- Simret Sultan
- Teklemariam Medhin
- Thomas Kelati
- Yidnekachew Shimangus
- Yonas Kifle
- Zemenfes Solomon
- Zersenay Tadese

== Businesspeople ==
- Haregot Abbai
- Kisanet Tedros

== Doctors and professors ==
- Asmeret Asefaw Berhe
- Haile Debas
- Paulos Tesfagiorgis
- Teamrat Ghezzehei

== Journalists ==
- David Fjäll
- Dawit Isaak
- Fesshaye Yohannes
- Hannah Pool
- Yirgalem Fisseha Mebrahtu

== Noblemen ==
- Abram Petrovich Gannibal
- Bahr negus Yeshaq
- Bahta Hagos
- Woldemichael Solomon

== Political figures ==
- Abdalla Jabir
- Abdulkadir Kebire
- Abraha Kassa
- General Oqbe Abreha
- Ali Abdu Ahmed
- Ali Said Abdella
- Aman Mikael Andom
- Araya Desta
- Astier Fesehazion
- Beraki Gebreselassie
- Estifanos Seyoum
- Filipos Woldeyohannes
- Germano Nati
- Haile Menkerios
- Haile Woldense
- Hamid Himid
- Hamid Idris Awate
- Haregot Abbai
- Ibrahim Sultan Ali
- Isaias Afwerki
- Joe Neguse
- Mahmoud Ahmed Sherifo
- Mesfin Hagos
- Mohamed Omer
- Mohammed Saeed Nawed
- Ogbe Abraha
- Osman Saleh Mohammed
- Osman Saleh Sabbe
- Paulos Tesfagiorgis
- Petros Solomon
- Saleh Meki
- Sebhat Ephrem
- Semhar Araia
- Semere Russom
- Tedla Bairu
- Tekle Kiflay
- Umar Hassan
- Woldeab Woldemariam
- Yemane Gebreab
- Zerai Deres

== Scholars and educators ==
- Bereket Habte Selassie
- Haben Girma
- Selamawi Asgedom
- Semhar Araia

== Singers and musicians ==
- Abeba Haile
- Abraham Afewerki
- Abrar Osman
- Adiam
- Afrob
- Aminé
- Bereket Mengisteab
- Dehab Faytinga
- Deno
- Eriam Sisters
- Helen Meles
- J. Holiday
- Lay Bankz
- Negash Ali
- Nipsey Hussle
- Rubi Rose
- Senait Mehari
- Senhit
- Tsehaytu Beraki
- Winta
- Yemane Baria
- Yohannes Tikabo

== Soldiers ==
- Mohammed Ibrahim Farag
