= Kidane =

Kidane (Amharic: ኪዳነ), is a word in various Ethiopian Semitic languages that translates to covenant or vow. It is also a common male name in Ethiopia and Eritrea.

== People with the name ==
Kidane is used as a given name in Eritrea and Ethiopia.

- Abraham Kidane, the Senior Economic Advisor to the Government of Eritrea and to the Ministry of National Development
- Azazet Habtezghi Kidane, Eritrean-British nurse working with refugees in Israel
- Daniel Kidane (born 1986), British composer
- Etalemahu Kidane (born 1983), Ethiopian long-distance runner who specializes in the 3000 metres
- Kidane Tadasse (born 1987), Eritrean long-distance runner who specializes in the 5000 metres and 10,000 metres
- Kidane Wedi Qeshi, Eritrean Government Official
- Kidane-Mariam Teklehaimanot (1933–2009), Ethiopian Roman Catholic prelate
- Saba Kidane (born 1978), Eritrean poet
- Simon Kidane (born 1975), Ethiopian basketball player
- Tekle Kidane (born 1939), former football player
- Werknesh Kidane (born 1981), Ethiopian long-distance track and field athlete running both 5000 and 10,000 metres

== Other uses ==
Kidane may also refer to:

- Ura Kidane Mehret, an Ethiopian Orthodox Church located on the Zege peninsula in Lake Tana of Ethiopia

== See also ==
- Habesha name
