= Berhe =

Berhe is a surname of Ethiopian and Eritrean origin, and may refer to:

- Asmeret Asefaw Berhe, American soil scientist, director of the Sierra Nevada Research Institute at the University of California, Merced
- Arefaine Berhe (born before 1997), Eritrean minister
- Eyasu Berhe (1956–2010), Ethiopian singer, writer, producer and poet
- Nat Berhe (born 1991), American professional football player
- Ruth Berhe (born 1995), Canadian singer-songwriter
- Saron Berhe (born 2007), Ethiopian middle-distance runner
