= Ruth Abraha =

Eritrean singer

- Born: 1989 (age 35–36); Ethiopia
- Origin: Asmara
- Genres: Eritrean music
- Occupation: Vocalist

Ruth Abraha, also known as Rutta Abraha (born 1989), is a singer from Eritrea. She is the lead singer of the group Wari.

== Career ==
Abraha's style has been described as a combination of Helen Meles, Elsa Kidane, and Gual Ankere. As of 2011, she was dominating the Eritrean music scene. The Ethiopian Review described her as "the hottest singer in the Horn of Africa right now". Abraha's fans call her "Ruta Shikor". With a relaxed, stylish persona, she presents an ideal of modern Eritrea.

Abraha was one of the performers at the 5th Eri Youth Festival, held in the SAWA Defence Training Center, Eritrea on 13–15 July 2012. Other acts at the festival included the Eriam Sisters and Helen Meles.

== See also ==
- Eriam Sisters
