= List of Eritrean artists =

The following list of Eritrean artists (in alphabetical order by last name) includes artists of various genres, who are notable and are either born in Eritrea, of Eritrean descent or who produce works that are primarily about Eritrea.

== A ==
- Michael Adonai (born 1962), painter

== M ==
- Aron Mehzion (born 1970), Eritrea-born German sculptor
- Yegizaw Michael, painter

== See also ==
- List of Eritrean Americans
- Eritrean culture
