= SNRI =

SNRI may refer to any of the following:

- Selective norepinephrine reuptake inhibitor
- Serotonin–norepinephrine reuptake inhibitor
- Sierra Nevada Research Institute
- Italian Social Republic, also known as the National Republican State of Italy (Stato Nazionale Repubblicano d'Italia; SNRI), a German puppet state from 1943 to 1945
