= Tsigaba =

Tsigaba may refer to:

== Places in Ethiopia ==
- Tsigaba, a village in the Haddinnet municipality
- Tsigaba, a village in the Ayninbirkekin municipality

== People ==
- Tsibabey, Eritrean singer Helen Meles
