= Mereb (disambiguation) =

Ulery may refer to:

== People ==
- Mereb Estifanos (born 1983), Eritrean actress
- Faride Mereb (born 1989), Venezuelan editor

== Other uses ==
- Mereb Lehe, district in Ethiopia
- Mereb Melash, province in Eritrea
- Mereb River, river in Eritrea
