= Yufang Jin =

- Education: Peking University, Boston University
- Known for: Wildfires, Remote Sensing, Ecosystem Sciences
- Website: jin.ucdavis.edu

Yufang Jin is a professor of remote sensing and ecosystem change at UC Davis's Department of Land, Air and Water Resources, and director of the Remote Sensing and Ecosystem Change Lab. Her research uses satellite imaging and other techniques to track and model how landscapes and ecosystems change.

== Early life and education ==
Jin received her Bachelor of Science in atmospheric physics in 1995 from Peking University, in Beijing, China. She continued her studies at Peking University to receive her master's degree in environmental science in 1998. In 2002, Jin completed her Ph.D. in geography from Boston University.

== Career and research ==
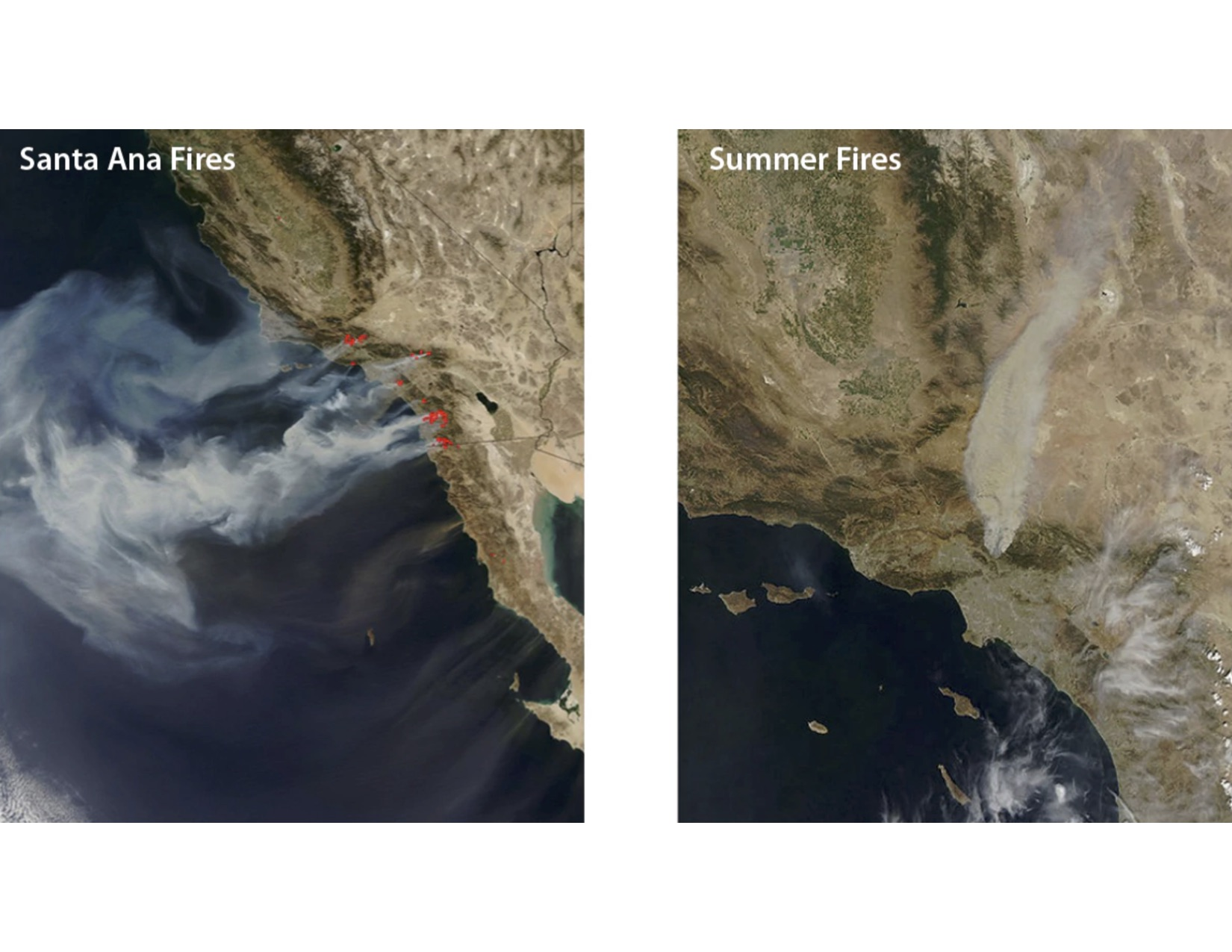
Jin's research for NASA on the relationship between Santa Ana winds and Southern California Fires.

After receiving her Ph.D., Jin worked as a postdoctoral research associate at the Department of Geography of Boston University. In 2003 she continued her geographical work as an assistant research scientist for the University of Maryland. In 2005, she entered University of California Irvine's Department of Earth System Science, and began her work as an assistant and associate research scientist. Jin has remained in the UC system, and since 2014 has worked as an assistant professor in remote sensing and ecosystem change for the Department of Land, Air and Water Resources at University of California, Davis/

Her research uses satellite modeling to observe the biogeophysical properties of land and monitor how they are changing. She additionally focuses on ecological responses to climate change and ecosystems' response to wildfires., in particular her current work identifying different fire regimes in Southern California, and the role of the Santa Ana winds

== Honors and awards ==
While a student at Peking University, Jin received awards for Excellent Student Honor, as well as the Guanghua Scholarship for Outstanding Graduate Students. In 2006, she received the second International Young Scientists’ Conference award on Global Change, and in 2008, received the NASA New Investigator Program in Earth Science Award.

== Publications ==
- van der Werf, G. R., Randerson, J. T., Giglio, L., Collatz, G. J., Mu, M., Kasibhatla, P. S., Morton, D. C., DeFries, R. S., Jin, Y., and van Leeuwen, T. T.: Global fire emissions and the contribution of deforestation, savanna, forest, agricultural, and peat fires (1997–2009), Atmos. Chem. Phys., 10, 11707–11735, https://doi.org/10.5194/acp-10-11707-2010, 2010.
- C. B. Schaaf, F. Gao, A. H. Strahler, W. Lucht, X. Li, T. Tsang, N. C. Strugnell, X. Zhang, Y. Jin, J.-P. Muller, P. Lewis, M. Barnsley, P. Hobson, M. Disney, G. Roberts, M. Dunderdale, C. Doll, R. d’Entremont, B. Hu, S. Liang, and J. L. Privette, “First operational BRDF, Albedo and Nadir reflectance products from MODIS,” Remote Sens. Environ., vol. 83, no. 1/2, pp. 135–148, Nov. 2002.
- Randerson, J.T., Liu, H., Flanner, M.G., Chambers, S.D., Jin, Y., Hess, P.G., Pfister, G., Mack, M.C., Treseder, K.K., Welp, L.R., Chapin, F.S., Harden, J.W., Goulden, M.L., Lyons, E., Neff, J.C., Schuur, E.A.G. & Zender, C.S. (2006) The impact of boreal forest fire on climate warming. Science, 314, 1130–1132.
