= 2000s in Eritrea =

The Eritrean–Ethiopian War ended with the signing of the Algiers Agreement on December 12, 2000. In 2002, in an effort to mitigate the effects of the prolonged stalemate with Ethiopia, the President's Administration created the Wefri Warsay Yika'alo. It is a comprehensive, revolutionary, national economic rehabilitation and development program in the aftermath of the destructive war with Ethiopia. Due to his frustration with the stalemated peace process with Ethiopia, the President of Eritrea Isaias Afwerki wrote a series of Eleven Letters to the UN Security Council and Secretary-General Kofi Annan. Despite the Algiers Agreement, tense relations with Ethiopia have continued and led to regional instability.

His government has also been condemned for allegedly arming and financing the insurgency in Somalia; the United States is considering labeling Eritrea a "State Sponsor of Terrorism," however, many experts on the topic have shied from this assertion, stating that "If there is one country where the fighting of extremists and terrorists was a priority when it mattered, it was Eritrea." This accusation has also been labeled a reckless move by others.

In December 2007, an estimated 4000 Eritrean troops remained in the 'demilitarized zone' with a further 120,000 along its side of the border. Ethiopia maintained 100,000 troops along its side.

Under Afwerki's rule, Eritrea has had one of the worst rates of press freedom in the world, and since 2007, the worst.
