= Marymoor Village station =

Light rail station in Redmond, Washington

64 Marymoor Village
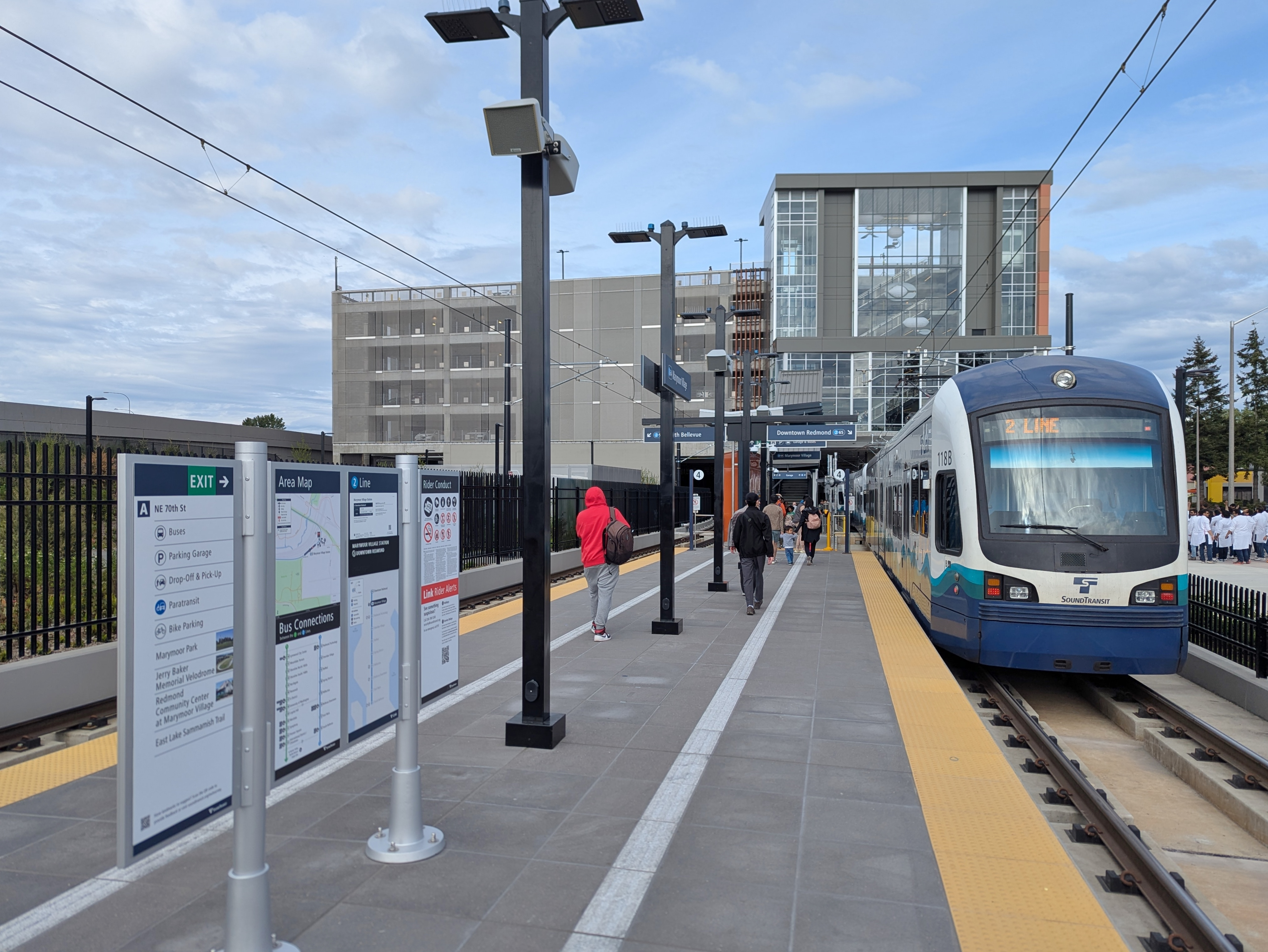
- Platform view of the parking garage

General information
- Location: 17300 Northeast 70th Street; Redmond, Washington; United States
- Coordinates: 47°40′03″N 122°06′33″W
- System: Link light rail
- Owner: Sound Transit
- Platforms: 1 island platform
- Tracks: 2
- Connections: King County Metro

Construction
- Structure type: At-grade
- Parking: 1,400 stalls
- Accessible: Yes

History
- Opened: May 10, 2025

Services
Preceding station	Sound Transit	Following station
Link
Redmond Technology toward Lynnwood City Center	2 Line	Downtown Redmond Terminus
Location

Marymoor Village station is a Link light rail station near Marymoor Park in Redmond, Washington, United States. The station is located along the south side of State Route 520 southwest of its interchange with State Route 202 near Downtown Redmond and Marymoor Park. It also includes a 1,400-stall park and ride in a garage that also contains a bus station.

The station was originally included in the Sound Transit 2 ballot measure in 2008, but was left out of the East Link Extension after a funding shortfall stemming from the City of Bellevue's desire for a tunneled alignment under Downtown Bellevue. Sound Transit instead completed environmental reviews and selected a preferred alignment to Downtown Redmond, indefinitely deferring the final segment of East Link until a later date. The Sound Transit 3 ballot measure, passed in 2016, includes $1.1 billion in funding for the two stations in Downtown Redmond, which were planned by 2024. Preliminary engineering on the Redmond extension was approved in February 2016, after being suspended in 2010.

The station was originally named SE Redmond until Marymoor Village was adopted as its permanent name in June 2022. Preliminary construction at the site began in late 2020. The station was opened on May 10, 2025, with a community festival and live performances.

Marymoor Village station consists of a single island platform that is accessed from the east by crossing one set of tracks or through the parking garage's stairs or elevator. The western exit is for emergency use only. Eastbound trains continue through the lower floor of the parking garage and turn west to cross under highway ramps. The station is near Marymoor Park, a major county park and music venue, as well as the East Lake Sammamish Trail.

The station has two pieces of public artwork that was commissioned by Sound Transit as part of its percent for art program. "Point of Connection", a mural by Yegizaw Michael, is inside the bus loop and depicts the history and diversity of Redmond. Michael's work was the first to be selected by Sound Transit's virtual selection panel, which formed in May 2020. Nova Jiang's work "Air Grove" consists of three airships that are suspended above the parking garage's western stairway.
