= Teamrat Ghezzehei =

American earth scientist

Teamrat Afewerki Ghezzehei
- Education: University of Asmara; Utah State University
- Spouse: Asmeret Asefaw Berhe
- Scientific career
- Workplaces: Lawrence Berkeley National Laboratory; University of California, Merced
- Thesis: Post-tillage dynamics of soil structural and hydraulic properties induced by capillary forces and external loading (2001)
- Website: Soil Physics Lab

Teamrat Afewerki Ghezzehei is a Professor of Environmental Soil Physics at the University of California, Merced. He specialises in soil physics, agroecology and environmental stewardship.

== Early life and education ==
Ghezzehei was born in the Province of Eritrea in Ethiopia. He attended the University of Asmara, where he earned an undergraduate degree in 1995. His senior thesis considered the use of prickly pears as compost to reclaim degraded soil.

After emigrating to the United States, Ghezzhei attended Utah State University, where he studied the micromechanics of soil aggregates. As a graduate student Ghezzehei, took an interest in nature photography, and spent his spare time in the national parks of Wyoming. After earning his doctoral degree, Ghezzehei joined the Lawrence Berkeley National Laboratory as a postdoctoral fellow.

== Research and career ==
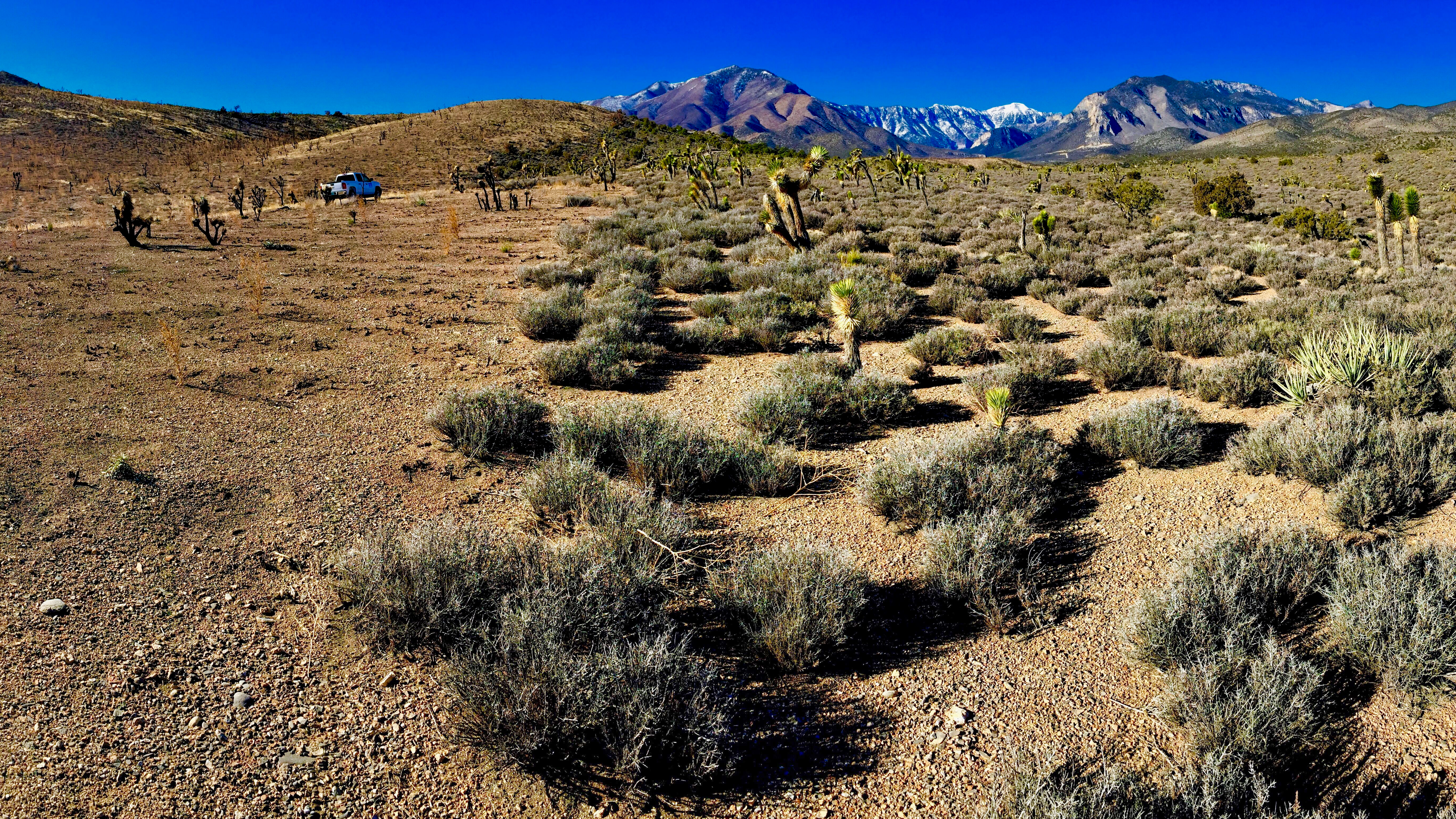
Boundary of the Carpenter 1 Fire, 2013 photo by Teamrat Ghezzehei

Ghezzehei was eventually promoted to Affiliate scientist at the Lawrence Berkeley National Laboratory. His early training involved the physics of fluid flow, and it wasn't until later in his career that he started applying this understanding to biology. He was appointed to the faculty at the University of California, Merced in 2009, where he established the Soil Physics Laboratory. Ghezzehei has applied his understanding of fluid flow to better conserve agriculture, including the NRI Projects in Five Points, California. He has been supported by the California Department of Water Resources to better understand the water retention, hydraulic conductivity and aggregate stability of the site. In particular, Ghezzehei looked to understand the impact of winter cover crops on soil water depletion and carbon capture.

Ghezzehei works in California, a region well known for its dangerous wildfires. Whilst it had long been assumed that prescribed burns and low-severity wildfires were not dangerous to the soil below, Ghezzehei showed that they can weaken the soil structures. Soil comprises mineral particles bound by organic matter and other components to form aggregates. In severe fires, the organic materials burn, but the same is now true in low-severity fires. Ghezzehei has shown that fire increases the pressure within the aggregates due to the vaporisation of water; weakening the aggregates and overall soil structure. The damage was worse if the soil was more wet. He went on to study the stability of these soil aggregates, performing simulated burn experiments and monitoring the amount of organic carbon released to the atmosphere in the form of carbon dioxide. His lab use various analytical techniques, including confocal laser microscopy.

In 2019, Ghezzehei was made Chair of the Life & Environmental Sciences Department at the University of California, Merced. He specialises in soil physics and environmental science. At UC Merced, Ghezzehei worked with Berhe to investigate the production of biochar and how it can be used to reduce greenhouse gas emissions. Ghezzehei and Berhe designed mobile biochar units, which convert biomass from agriculture and forestry to biochar.

== Select publications ==
- Albalasmeh, Ammar A.; Berhe, Asmeret Asefaw; Ghezzehei, Teamrat A. (2013). "A new method for rapid determination of carbohydrate and total carbon concentrations using UV spectrophotometry". Carbohydrate Polymers. 97 (2): 253–261. doi:10.1016/j.carbpol.2013.04.072. ISSN 0144-8617. PMID 23911443.
- Ghezzehei, Teamrat A.; Or, Dani (2001). "Rheological Properties of Wet Soils and Clays under Steady and Oscillatory Stresses". Soil Science Society of America Journal. 65 (3): 624–637. Bibcode:2001SSASJ..65..624G. doi:10.2136/sssaj2001.653624x. ISSN 1435-0661.
- Or, Dani; Ghezzehei, Teamrat A (2002-02-01). "Modeling post-tillage soil structural dynamics: a review". Soil and Tillage Research. Soil Fragmentation and Seedbed Characterization. 64 (1): 41–59. Bibcode:2002STilR..64...41O. doi:10.1016/S0167-1987(01)00256-2. ISSN 0167-1987.

== Personal life ==
Ghezzehei is married to Asmeret Asefaw Berhe, a fellow soil scientist and director of the Sierra Nevada Research Institute at UC Merced. The couple met in Eritrea. He has continued to take photographs of nature.
