= Abeba =

Abeba may refer to:

- Abeba Haile, Eritrean singer
- Addis Ababa, capital city of Ethiopia, alternately spelled "Addis Abeba"
  - Duke of Addis Abeba, title using this spelling
  - Ethiopian Catholic Archeparchy of Addis Abeba
  - Addis Abeba Stadium
  - Royal College, Addis Abeba

== See also ==
- Abebe Bikila (1932–1973), Ethiopian runner
- Addis Abebe (born 1970), Ethiopian runner
