= Erika Marín-Spiotta =

Biogeochemist and ecosystem ecologist

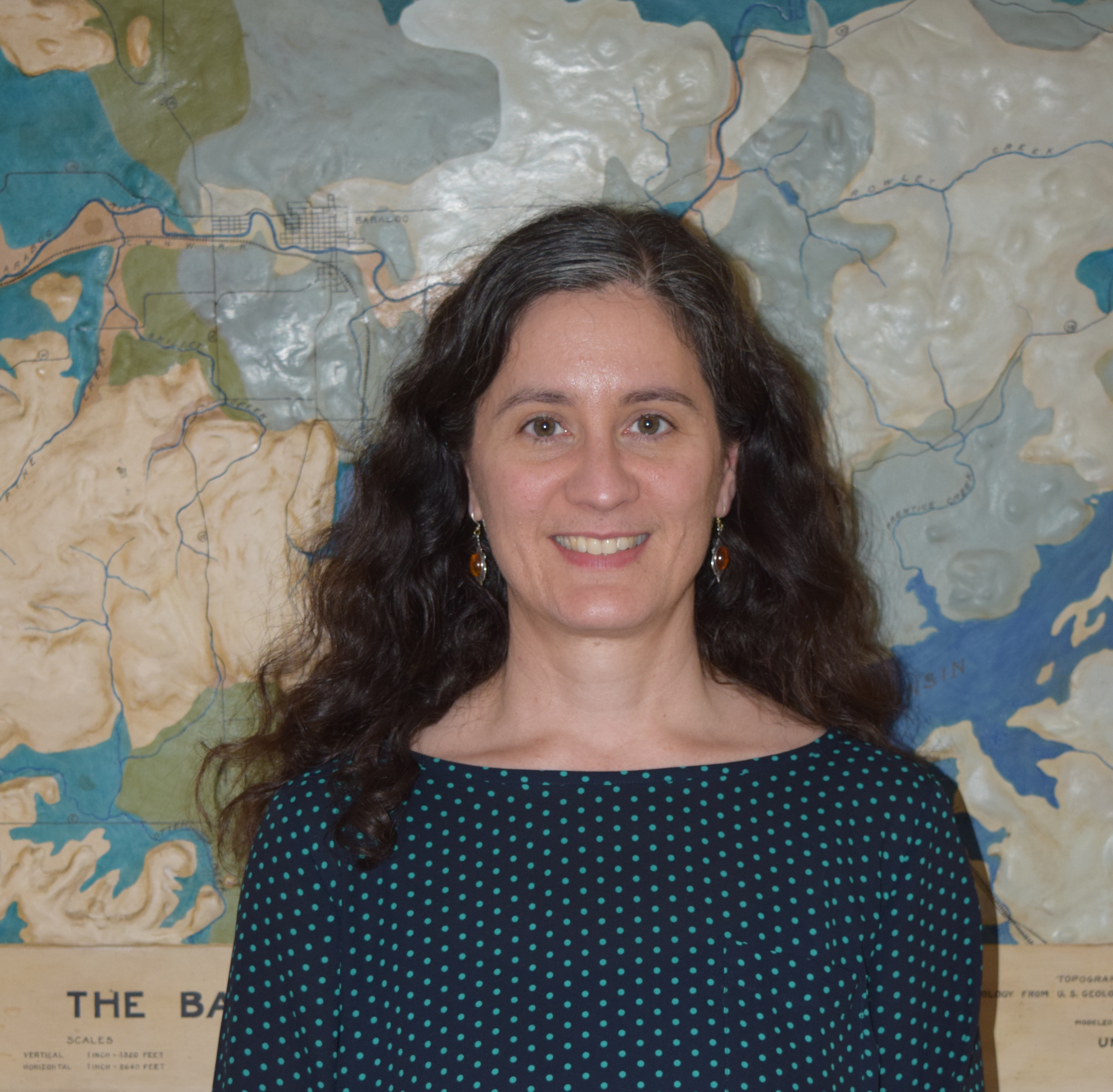
- Education: Stanford University (B.S.), University of California, Berkeley (Ph.D.)
- Awards: PECASE Award, NSF CAREER Award, Sulzman Award for Excellence in Education and Mentoring
- Scientific career
- Fields: Biogeochemistry, soil science, ecology, geography
- Thesis: Controls on above and belowground carbon storage during tropical reforestation
- Website: https://marinspiotta.wordpress.com/

Erika Marín-Spiotta is a biogeochemist and ecosystem ecologist. She is currently Professor of Geography at the University of Wisconsin-Madison. She is best-known for her research of the terrestrial carbon cycle and is an advocate for underrepresented groups in the sciences, specifically women.

== Early life and education ==
Marín-Spiotta grew up in Spain. She became interested in her area of study and spending time outside with her family, visiting archeological sites. In 1997, she graduated from Stanford University with a B.S. in Biology with a Minor in Political Science. Nine years later, Marín-Spiotta completed her Ph.D. of Ecosystem Science from University of California, Berkeley. Her thesis, “Controls on above and belowground carbon storage during tropical reforestation,” contributed to her field as it discussed how changes in land use affect carbon sequestration in soil and how the establishment of secondary forests can contribute to biodiversity conservation. During her time at UC-Berkeley, she was a Graduate Research Environmental Fellow for the Department of Energy.

== Career ==
After working as a NSF Postdoctoral Research Fellow in the Department of Geography at the University of California, Santa Barbara, Marín-Spiotta joined the faculty at UW-Madison in 2009 as an Assistant Professor in Geography. In the following years, she also became an affiliate of the Latin American, Caribbean, and Iberian Studies Program and Center for Culture, History, and the Environment, the Nelson Institute for Environmental Studies, and the Departments of Soil Science and Forest and Wildlife Ecology. Marín-Spiotta was promoted to Associate Professor in 2015 and to Professor in 2019 in the Department of Geography. In 2019, Marin-Spiotta was awarded the Presidential Early Career Award for Scientists & Engineers (PECASE).

== Research ==
Marín-Spiotta focuses on the ways in which both human-caused land use and climate changes affect biodiversity, biomass, and the biogeochemistry of the atmosphere, water, and soil, in particular as related to terrestrial carbon cycling. Her research offers insight into a variety of fields and the intersections between them, including soil science, biogeochemistry, ecosystem ecology, and geography. Specifically, much of her research looks at these impacts in tropical ecosystems and the strength and ability of forests in different stages of succession to store and sequester carbon. More recently, Marín-Spiotta has conducted research about paleosols and how the carbon stored in these soils could be a potential driver of climate change in the future. Following this research, Marín-Spiotta and her colleague were awarded a National Science Foundation grant to continue investigating the role of deep soil carbon in the carbon cycle. Currently, Marín-Spiotta’s lab researches a variety of projects across a range of questions focused on how global change is altering ecosystems and critical global elemental cycles.

=== Selected publications ===
- Marín-Spiotta, E. 2018. Harassment should count as scientific misconduct. Nature 557: 141.
- Berhe, A.A., R. Barnes, J. Six and E. Marín-Spiotta. 2018. Role of erosional mass movement on the biogeochemical cycling of essential elements: carbon, nitrogen, and phosphorus. Annual Review of Earth and Planetary Sciences 46: 521-548.
- Powers, J.S. and E. Marín-Spiotta. 2017. Ecosystem processes and biogeochemical cycles during secondary tropical forest succession. Annual Review of Ecology, Evolution and Systematics 48:497-519.
- Marín-Spiotta, E., N.T. Chaopricha, A. F. Plante, A.F. Diefendorf, C.W. Müller, S. Grandy and J.A. Mason. (2014). "Long-term stabilization of deep soil carbon by fire and burial during early Holocene climate change." Nature Geoscience Vol. 7.
- Marín-Spiotta, E., K.E. Gruley, J. Crawford, E.A. Atkinson, J.R. Miesel, S. Greene, C. Cardona-Correa and R.G.M. Spencer. (2014). "Paradigm shifts in soil organic matter research affect aquatic carbon turnover interpretations: Transcending disciplinary and ecosystem boundaries." Biogeochemistry Vol. 117.
- Marín-Spiotta, E. and S. Sharma. (2013). "Carbon storage in successional and plantation forest soils: a tropical analysis." Global Ecology and Biogeography Vol. 22.
- Marín-Spiotta, E., W.L. Silver, C.W. Swanston, and R. Ostertag. (2009). "Soil organic matter dynamics during 80 years of reforestation of tropical pastures." Global Change Biology Vol. 15.
- Marín-Spiotta, E., C.W. Swanston, M.S. Torn, W.L. Silver, and S.D. Burton. (2008). "Chemical and mineral control of soil carbon turnover in abandoned tropical pastures." Geoderma, Vol. 143.
- Marín-Spiotta, E., R. Ostertag, and W.L. Silver. (2007). "Long-term patterns in tropical reforestation: plant community composition and aboveground biomass accumulation." Ecological Applications Vol. 17.

== Awards and leadership ==
Marín-Spiotta has received many awards for her contributions in the sciences, mentorship, and inclusion. She was the Secretary of the Biogeosciences section at the American Geophysical Union in 2015 and 2016 and has held various other leadership and volunteer positions for the AGU.

Marín-Spiotta is an advocate for underrepresented groups in the sciences and is committed to increasing awareness about sexual harassment in the field. She is a board member of the Earth Science Women's Network (ESWN) which works to mentor and support women in the geosciences. The National Science Foundation ADVANCE Program awarded her and a team a $1.1 million grant to investigate these issues and establish ways to further the advancement of women in STEM, specifically focusing on how bystander intervention can lead to positive results.

- Presidential Early Career Award for Scientists and Engineers (2019)
- National Science Foundation’s CAREER Award (2014)
- Sulzman Award for Excellence in Education and Mentoring from the American Geophysical Union (2016)
- President’s Award from the Association for Women Geoscientists (2016)
- Vilas Associate Award from UW-Madison.
- Ambassador Award, American Geophysical Union (2020)
- Elected Fellow of the Ecological Society of America (2022)
