= Habesha naming conventions =

Habesha names, the naming convention used in Ethiopia and Eritrea, do not have family names and typically consist of an individual personal name (given name) and a separate patronym. This is similar to Arabic, Icelandic, and Somali naming conventions. Traditionally among most Ethiopians and Eritreans the lineage is traced paternally; legislation has been passed in Eritrea that allows for this to be done on the maternal side as well.

In this convention, children are given a name at birth, by which name they will be known. To differentiate from others in the same generation with the same name, their father's first name and sometimes grandfather's first name is added. This may continue ad infinitum. Outside Ethiopia, this is often mistaken for a surname or middle name but unlike European names, different generations do not have the same second or third names.

In marriage, unlike in some Western societies, women do not change their maiden name, as the second name is not a surname.

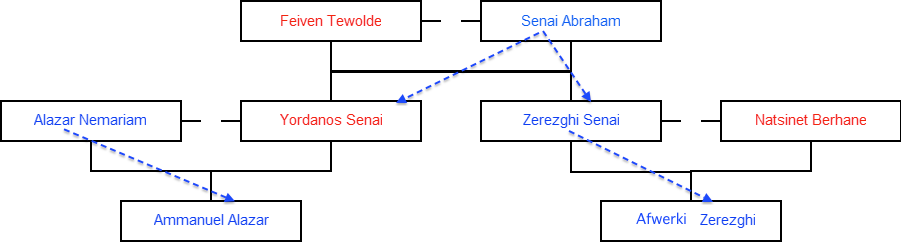
Example Eritrean family tree explained below. Blue: male; red: female.

In the example above, the progenitors, Feiven and Senai, may be differentiated from others in their generation by their father's name. In this example, Feiven's and Senai's fathers' first names are Tewolde and Abraham respectively.

Feiven and Senai have a daughter and a son, each of whom is married and has a child. The first to have a child (a son) is their daughter, Yordanos Senai; she and her husband name the boy Ammanuel. The next sibling to have a child is Yordanos' brother, Zerezghi Senai; this child is also a son, named Afwerki. Ammanuel and Afwerki would each get their father's first name for their last.

In contemporary post-independence Eritrea, a person's legal name consists of their given name, followed by the given name of one of the parents (written name position equivalent to a "middle name" in Western naming conventions) then the given name of a grandparent (position equivalent to a "last name" in Western naming conventions). In modern Ethiopia, a person's legal name includes both the father and the individual's given names, so that the father's given name becomes the child's "last name", there is no actual middle name. In Ethiopia, and traditionally in Eritrea, the naming conventions follow the father's line of descent, while certain exemptions can be made in Eritrea in which the family may choose to use the mother's line of descent. Usually in both countries the grandparent's name of the person is omitted in a similar way to how the middle name is omitted in Western naming conventions excluding important legal documents.

Ethiopians and Eritreans in the diaspora who have to legally adopt Western naming conventions usually convert their father's or grandfather's given name into an official last name or surname, with the ones who choose their grandfather's name additionally repurposing their father's name as an official middle name.

== Culture ==
Ethiopians, Eritreans, and related cultures thus put heavy stock in having the names of their forefathers memorized and being able to recite their lineage from a young age. This plays a role in numerous aspects of the region's cultures including proving entitlements to inheritances, descent from sub-ethnic kinship groups known as clans or tribes, as well as proving unrelatedness as far back as seven generations due to strict rules (prohibited degree of kinship) and a social stigma towards consanguine marriage in the Ethiopian Orthodox Tewahedo Church.

Among the Amhara people a child's name can relate to or build upon their father's, resulting in a sort of multigenerational wordplay which in some families has continued for centuries. An example of this practice (Amharic: ሚግጥም ስም IPA: migətʼom səm; lit. "a poetic name") would be a man named Abebe (he flowered, blossomed) son of Woldemariam, together meaning "the son of Saint Mary (Jesus) has blossomed. He could then name his son Kidus (holy) or Kiduse (he is holy) and so on.
