= Jennifer Harden =

Soil scientist

- Education: University of California, Berkeley (PhD)
- Scientific career
- Workplaces: United States Geological Survey
- Thesis: A study of soil development using the geochronology of Merced river deposits, California (1982)

Jennifer Harden is geologist known for her research on soils, particularly tracking changes in soil profiles over time and the role of soil systems in carbon and nitrogen cycling.

== Education and career ==
Harden earned her BS (1976), MS (1979), and PhD (1982) from the University of California, Berkeley. Following her PhD, she joined the United States Geological Survey where she became a scientist emeritus in 2013.

Harden was elected a fellow of the American Association for the Advancement of Science in 2011. In 2015, Harden was elected a fellow of the American Geophysical Union who cited her "for fundamental contributions to quantitative understanding of soils in global change and carbon cycling".

== Research ==
Harden's PhD research used different properties of the soil to establish a "profile development index" or "soil development index" which can be used to track changes in soil over millions of years. Harden and others use this to track the age of soils and changing climate conditions. Harden's research has also considered carbon lost from soils in forests and cropland, and the capture of carbon in soil during deglaciation of the Laurentide Ice Sheet. The connections between fire in boreal forests and carbon is another focus of Harden's research. She has examined the impact of burning and permafrost in soils and assessed the level of organic carbon transferred to the atmosphere from soils in Alaskan forests and peatland. With Margaret Torn, Harden co-advised Asmeret Berhe in her research on soil erosion which showed that erosion allow soils to store more carbon. Harden has also quantified the amount of carbon and nitrogen that would be released under different future climate scenarios from Gelisols, soils impacted by permafrost. Through collaborative research projects, Harden has quantified the amount of soil organic carbon stored in permafrost and the release of this organic carbon under warming climate conditions.

=== Selected publications ===
- Harden, J. W.; Trumbore, S. E.; Stocks, B. J.; Hirsch, A.; Gower, S. T.; O'neill, K. P.; Kasischke, E. S. (December 2000). "The role of fire in the boreal carbon budget: FIRE IN THE BOREAL CARBON BUDGET". Global Change Biology. 6 (S1): 174–184. Bibcode:2000GCBio...6S.174H. doi:10.1046/j.1365-2486.2000.06019.x. PMID 35026928. S2CID 86434480.
- Harden, Jennifer W. (1 July 1982). "A quantitative index of soil development from field descriptions: Examples from a chronosequence in central California". Geoderma. 28 (1): 1–28. Bibcode:1982Geode..28....1H. doi:10.1016/0016-7061(82)90037-4. ISSN 0016-7061.
- Schuur, E. A. G.; McGuire, A. D.; Schädel, C.; Grosse, G.; Harden, J. W.; Hayes, D. J.; Hugelius, G.; Koven, C. D.; Kuhry, P.; Lawrence, D. M.; Natali, S. M.; Olefeldt, D.; Romanovsky, V. E.; Schaefer, K.; Turetsky, M. R.; Treat, C. C.; Vonk, J. E. (April 2015). "Climate change and the permafrost carbon feedback". Nature. 520 (7546): 171–179. Bibcode:2015Natur.520..171S. doi:10.1038/nature14338. hdl:1874/330256. PMID 25855454. S2CID 4460926.

== Awards and honors ==
- Fellow, American Geophysical Union (2015)
- Fellow, American Association for the Advancement of Science (2011)
