= Abebe =

Abebe (Amharic: አበበ) is a male given name and patronymic of Ethiopian origin as well as a surname of Nigerian origin. Notable people with the name include:

== Given name ==
- Abebe Aregai (1903–1960), Ethiopian Prime Minister from 1957 to 1960
- Abebe Bikila (1932–1973), Ethiopian marathon runner and two-time Olympic champion
- Abebe Dinkesa (born 1984), Ethiopian long-distance runner
- Abebe Fekadu (born 1970), Ethiopian-Australian Paralympic weightlifter
- Abebe Gessese (born 1953), Ethiopian Olympic long jumper
- Abebe Mekonnen (boxer) (born 1940), Ethiopian Olympic boxer
- Abebe Mekonnen (born 1964), Ethiopian former long-distance runner and 1989 Boston Marathon winner
- Abebe Wakgira (born 1921), Ethiopian Olympic long-distance runner
- Abebe Zerihun (born 1955), Ethiopian Olympic middle-distance runner
- Abiye Abebe (1917–1974), Ethiopian politician and son-in-law of Haile Selassie
- Addis Abebe (born 1970), Ethiopian former long-distance runner and 10,000 m Olympic medallist
- Alemu Abebe, Ethiopian politician during the Derg
- Biruk Abebe (born 1969), Ethiopian cyclist

== Family name ==
- Christopher E. Abebe (1919–2018), Nigerian human resources executive
- Daniel Abebe, American lawyer
- Medferiashwork Abebe (1925–2009), Empress-consort of Ethiopia
- Mekides Abebe (born 2001), Ethiopian athlete, All-Africa Games champions in women's 3000 metres steeplechase (2019)
- Moet Abebe (Laura Monyeazo Abebe; born 1989), Nigerian television presenter, video jockey, and actress
- Rediet Abebe (born 1991), Ethiopian computer scientist
- Tsiyon Abebe (born 2006), Ethiopian middle- and long-distance runner

== See also ==
- Abeba (disambiguation)
