= Afewerki =

Afewerki, Afwerki or Afewerk (Tigrinya: ኣፈወርቂ or አፈወርቅ) is an Eritrean name that may refer to

- Afewerk Tekle (1932–2012), Ethiopian painter on African and Christian themes, stained glass artist
- Abraham Afewerki (1966–2006), Eritrean singer
- Isaias Afwerki (born 1946), President of Eritrea
