= Quatit, Eritrea =

Quatit ዃዕቲት
- Town
- Quatit, Eritrea (Eritrea)
- Country: Eritrea
- Region: Debub
- Time zone: UTC+3 (EAT)

Also known as Qua'atit, Quatit (Tigrinya: ዃዕቲት) is a town located in the Debub region of Eritrea. It sits about 16 kilometers (10 mi) west of Adi Keyih.

== Geography ==
Quatit is located in southern Eritrea, approximately 100 km from the capital city of Asmara.

== Demographics ==
The population of Quatit is around 1,000 to 3,000 people. Most of the village’s inhabitants are Orthodox Christians, with a few Muslim families. The language spoken in Quatit is Tigrinya.

== Religion ==
There are two Orthodox churches in Quatit: Selassie (Holy Trinity) and Abune Aregawi. There is one mosque in the village.

== Economy ==
Many of the residents are farmers and cattle herders, with a few shopkeepers. The main income is from agriculture. Villagers grow a variety of grains, including teff, maize, sorghum, and wheat, as well as onions, papaya, oranges, lemons, tomatoes, potatoes, and carrots. Families also keep livestock in the form of goats, sheep, cows, camels, and donkeys. Every Saturday, there is a market in the middle of town, where one can buy and sell fruits and vegetables, teff and other grains, and animals. Quatit does not have electricity, nor internet. There is no foreign investment in Quatit, and there are no factories or industries in the village. Sunday is the official day of rest, and no shops operate on this day.

== Culture and contemporary life ==
Most boys act as shepherds. Usually, shepherding begins at ages 7–9 until about age 13, when the job is passed on to a younger sibling. School has two shifts, a morning shift and an afternoon shift, allowing children to both help their families and attend school. A few girls also act as shepherds. Girls are mostly expected to help their mothers with chores such as carrying water. The MayBellew and MayFallo wells are used for swimming and for animals. The MayBerazio well is for drinking. Popular sports include soccer, basketball, running, and shot put. These can be played on school sports teams. Commonly consumed foods are injera bread and suwa, a homebrewed alcohol.

== Important structures ==
Quatit has two churches, one mosque, and a hospital. There is also an abandoned Italian military base by the village, called Forto.

== Government ==
Quatit administers four other, smaller villages: Adiferti, Maadoruba, Adi'awhi, and Adi’etket.

== Education ==
Quatit has a preschool, an elementary school, a junior high school, and a high school. School has a morning shift and an afternoon shift, allowing children to both help their families and attend school.

== Transportation ==
There are buses to Asmara, Dekemhare, and Adikeih. The bus from Dekemhare to Quatit comes once a day, and the bus to Asmara comes three times a week. Quatit is not serviced by trains or planes.

== Notable people ==
- Tsehaytu Beraki (singer). She was known for her love songs and traditional music.
