= Asmeret Asefaw Berhe =

Eritrean-American soil biogeochemist

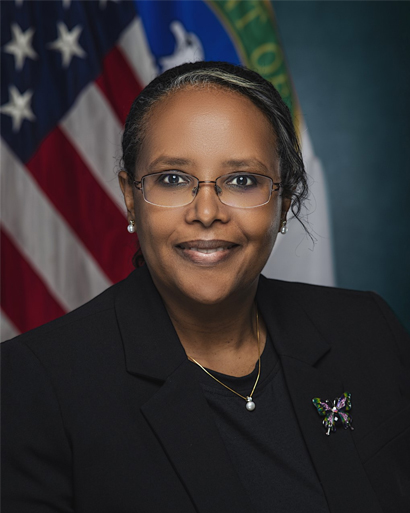

Director, Office of Science, Department of Energy
- In office May 19, 2022 – March 28, 2024
- President: Joe Biden
- Preceded by: Chris Fall
- Succeeded by: Harriet Kung (acting)

Personal details
- Born: Asmara, Ethiopia
- Spouse: Teamrat Ghezzehei
- Education: University of Asmara, Michigan State University, University of California, Berkeley
- Website: https://aaberhe.com/

Asmeret Asefaw Berhe is a nationally recognized American soil scientist and political ecologist. A professor of soil biogeochemistry at the University of California, Merced since 2009, she is the Ted and Jan Falasco Chair in Earth Sciences and Geology in the Department of Life and Environmental Sciences. Her research works to understand how soil helps regulate the Earth's climate.

Berhe became the director of UC Merced's Sierra Nevada Research Institute in July 2025. She served as Director of the Office of Science at the US Department of Energy from 2022 to 2024.

== Education and early career ==
Berhe was born and raised in Asmara. She earned her Bachelors of Science in Soil and Water Conservation at the University of Asmara, where she was one of three women in a 55-person class in the soil science department. She later attended Michigan State University for her master's degree in Political Ecology, with an emphasis on the effects of land degradation, working to understand how landmines cause land degradation.

She then performed her doctoral work at University of California, Berkeley, where she received her Ph.D. in Biogeochemistry in ecologist John Harte's laboratory, where she was also co-advised by Margaret Torn (Lawrence Berkeley National Laboratory) and Jennifer Harden (US Geological Survey, Menlo Park). Berhe's graduate work sought to understand how erosion affected the exchange of carbon between the land and the air. She found that erosion can actually cause soil to store more carbon. She continued her postdoctoral research at UC Berkeley with the support of the President's Postdoctoral Fellowship Program under the mentorship of Johan Six and Jillian Banfield, and then moved to University of California, Davis to continue her postdoctoral work.

== Research ==
Berhe's research interests center on the effect of changing environmental conditions—specifically fire, erosion, and climate change—on important soil processes. Her group is working to understand how perturbations in the environment affect how essential elements like carbon and nitrogen cycle through the soil system. One of her group's projects is to understand how drought and wildfire affect soil's ability to store carbon, taking her out to Yosemite National Park and the Sierra Nevada for fieldwork. Given the prevalence of drought in California, this work is of particular public importance, and as a result, has been highlighted by public figures like California Congressman Jerry McNerney (D-CA 9th District). Her team has also been working to fill data gaps of carbon dynamics in overlooked regions to improve global carbon projections.

Her research extends to political ecology, working to understand the contribution of armed conflict to land degradation and how people interact with their environment. Berhe has co-authored a review taking stock of the relationship between global change, soil, and human security (including food security and water quality) in the 21st century, citing possible interventions and solutions for sustainable soil management.

Berhe's work has garnered support from a number of funding sources, including the National Science Foundation CAREER Award, the University of California President's Research Catalyst Awards, the United States Department of Energy, and more.

== Advocacy and global impact of work ==
Berhe's work at the intersection of soil, climate change, and political ecology lends itself well to a number of global issues. During her graduate career, she was a member of the working group that produced the Millennium Ecosystem Assessment, which was called for by the United Nations Secretary Kofi Annan to assess the impact of humans on the environment. She was one of the lead authors on the 2005 report's chapter on "Drivers of Change in Ecosystem Condition and Services." The Assessment received the Zayed International Prize for the Environment in 2005.

In 2018, Berhe was selected as part of the inaugural National Academies of Sciences, Engineering, and Medicine New Voices in Sciences, Engineering, and Medicine cohort, as an early career leader working to advance the conversation around key emerging global issues and communicate the evidence base around those challenges.

An advocate for women in science, Berhe was a co-Principal Investigator of ADVANCEGeo, which is working to transform the workplace climate of the geosciences to increase retention of women in the field and develop a sustainable model that can be transferred to other scientific domains. Currently, the Earth Science Women's Network (ESWN), the Association for Women Geoscientists, and the American Geophysical Union (AGU) have partnered to address the issue of sexual harassment in the earth, space and environmental sciences. The program led by Erika Marín-Spiotta was run with support from a four-year $1.1 million grant from the National Science Foundation, and has continued with support from NSF.

She previously served as an advisory board member of 500 Women Scientists, a grassroots organization working to make science open, inclusive, and accessible, and is on the leadership board of the Earth Science Women's Network.

Berhe has delivered 200+ invited talks worldwide, including two TED Talks, related to soil science, biogeochemistry and nature-based climate change solutions at the White House, Congressional hearings, and more. Her work has been covered by a variety of national and international media outlets, including the BBC, NPR, the Washington Post, ABC News, Science, Nature, and Teen Vogue.

== Department of Energy ==
At the Department of Energy (DOE), after nomination by President Joseph R. Biden and confirmation by the US Senate, she served as the Director of the Office of Science. The Office of Science (SC) is the largest supporter of basic research in physical sciences in the US. The mission of SC is "to deliver scientific discoveries and major scientific tools to transform our understanding of nature and advance the energy, economic, and national security of the United States". The Director of SC oversees the management of eight programs (Advanced Scientific Computing Research, Basic Energy Sciences, Biological and Environmental Research, Fusion Energy Sciences, High Energy Physics, Nuclear Physics, Accelerator R&D and Production, and Isotope R&D and Production) and related federal research initiatives along with the grant-making process to hundreds of academic institutions, all 17 of the Department of Energy national labs, industry partners, and the management of ten national laboratories and 28 national scientific user facilities. As Director of SC her responsibilities also included budget advocacy for physical sciences and overseeing the work ten national laboratories and 28 national scientific user facilities and much more. Accomplishments under her tenure include:

- The SC budget grew annually (three fiscal years) every year she served in the position, resulting in the largest SC budget since the office opened.
- Launching of two new programs to increase federal support of Emerging Research Institutions (ERIs): Reaching a New Energy Sciences Workforce (RENEW, a training program) and Funding for Accelerated, Inclusive Research (FAIR, a capacity-building program).
- Implementation of the first-ever requirement for submission of a plan for Promoting Inclusive and Equitable Research (PIER plan) for all funding requests to SC.
- Increased funding available to early career researchers: international travel/collaboration allowance for early career researchers awarded funding via the Early Career Research Program (ECP) and the Office of Science Graduate Student Research program (SSCGSR); increase in graduate student support across SC Awards; and an increase in award size for DOE Early Career Research Program awards.

== Awards and honors ==
- Member National Academy of Engineering
- Fellow & Joanne Simpson Medal, American Geophysical Union
- Fellow & Bromery Award, The Geological Society of America
- John Hayes Award, Geochemical Society
- University of California, Berkeley's President's Postdoctoral Fellowship Awardee, 2006
- Hellman Family Foundation Fellow, 2011
- NSF CAREER Award, 2014
- Young Investigator Award, Sigma Xi, 2014
- New Voices in Science, Engineering, and Medicine, National Academy of Sciences, 2018
- Randolph W. "Bill" and Cecile T. Bromery Award, Geological Society of America, 2019
- Great Immigrants Award, Carnegie Corporation of New York, 2020
