= Haregot Abbai =

Eritrean businessman and politician

Haregot Abbai (Abay)
- KCVO
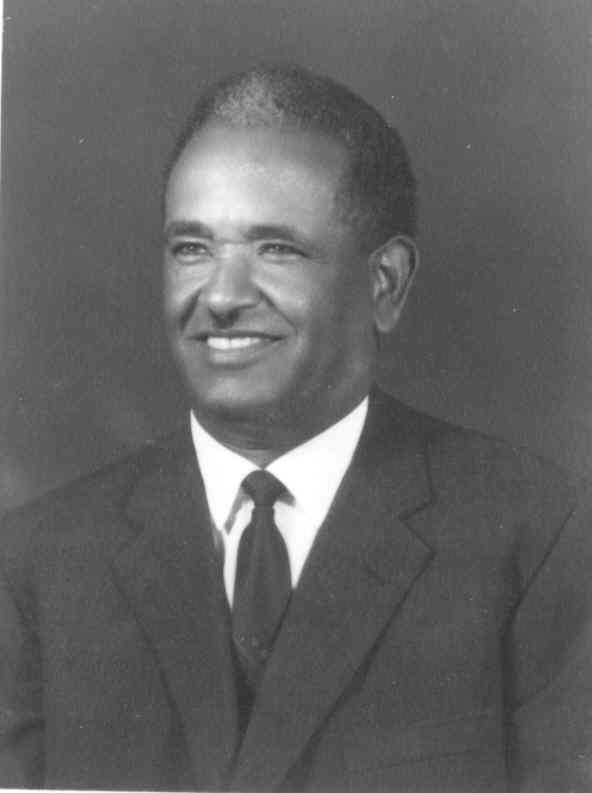
- Mayor of Asmara (1963- 1974)
- Born: 1909; Italian Eritrea
- Died: 1979 (aged 69–70); Addis Ababa, Ethiopia
- Religion: Ethiopian Orthodox Church

Mayor of Asmara
- In office 1963–1974
- Monarch: Haile Selassie

Personal details
- Party: Society for Love of Country (1940s)

Dejazmatch Haregot Abbai (Abay) KCVO (1909–1979) was an Eritrean businessman and politician. He was member of political party known as “Mahber Fikre Hager” (Society for Love of Country) in Eritrea in the late 1940s. In 1952, following the Federation of Eritrea with Ethiopia, he was elected as a member of the newly created Eritrean Assembly. During the early days of the Federation (1952–55) he served in the positions of Director of Interior, Secretary of Justice and Secretary of Economy. In 1963, a year after the Federation ended and Eritrea was annexed by Ethiopia, he was appointed as the Mayor of Asmara (then the second largest city in Ethiopia). In 1974 with the onset of military dictatorship Derg in Ethiopia he was imprisoned in Addis Ababa along with most of former Emperor Haile Selassie cabinet members, most regional governors, many senior military officers and other dignitaries. In 1979, he was killed by the Derg dictatorship in Ethiopia.
