= Abeba Haile =

- Born: Abeba Haile
- Origin: Adi-Tekelezan Eritrea
- Genre: Eritrean music

Abeba Haile (Tigrinya: ኣበባ ሃይለ; born August 2, 1970) is a prominent Eritrean singer. She has produced several albums in the Tigrinya language, and can play multiple instruments: traditional kirar, piano, bass guitar, and guitar. Abeba was also a member of the Eritrean People's Liberation Front (EPLF), a military organization that liberated Eritrea from Ethiopian colonialism. She joined the organization at a young age.

Abeba has been a highly influential singer, particularly during the 1998–2001 war with Ethiopia, where her music played a significant role in motivating and inspiring the people.

== Discography ==
Albums

- Vol. 1 Greatest Hits 1996
- Vol. 2 Me’quei’rsey 2001
- Vol. 3 Natey 2004
- Vol. 4 Africa 2007
- Vol. 5 Instrumental 2011
- Vol. 6 Ezis Men Yirekbo 2017

Single Hit Releases

- Amanido
- Ayenay Yhaysh
- Bahri
- Eirab
- Gahdi dyu
- Hadas ertra
- Hade Libi

Co-productions

The Melody of Nejem (Volume 1)
