= Dehab Faytinga =

Eritrean singer and musician

Faytinga
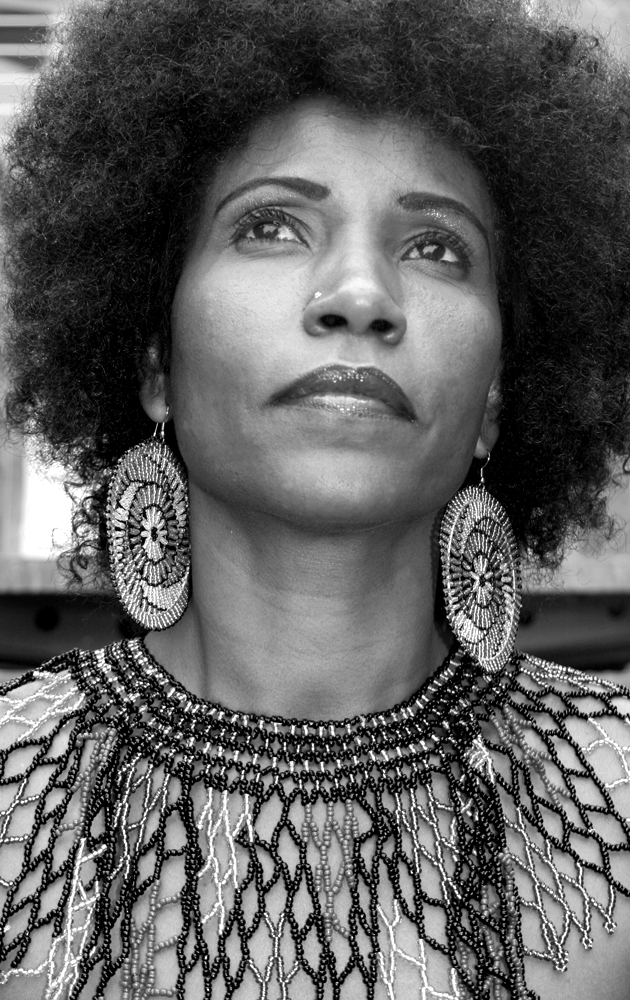

Background information
- Born: Dahab Faid Tinga; 10 June 1962 (age 64); Asmara, Ethiopia
- Origin: Eritrea
- Genres: World, Kunama
- Label: Cobalt
- Website: faytinga.com

Dahab Faid Tinga (born 10 June 1962), known professionally as Faytinga, is an Eritrean singer and musician. She belongs to the Nilotic Kunama and Tigrinya ethnic groups.

== Early life ==
Faytinga was born on 10 June 1962 in Asmara, Eritrea to a Tigrinya mother and Kunama father, who was a revered freedom fighter among the ethnic group. The state of anarchy that ensued in 1942 after the defeat of the Italian army, forced her father to form a military band to defend the Kunama people against the raids they suffered. He was given the nickname of 'Fighting gun' (taken from his name 'Faid Tinga') by the British administration in the early 1950s. Between 1952 and 1962, he was elected enthusiastically to represent the Kunama people. At the end of the Federal arrangement he was imprisoned several times by the Ethiopian Government for his pro-Eritrean work. He was a political prisoner when the Ethiopian military regime came to power and he was freed by the EPLF in 1974 when they stormed the prison in Asmara. Faid Tinga Longhi was a hero for the Kunama people.

in 1977, at the age of fourteen, Faytinga joined the liberation struggle and she became a combatant during the Eritrean War of Independence until the liberation in 1991. After being given military and political training at Bilekat, she was assigned to the public administration department. In 1987 she started to work with the Department of National Guidance to set up the Kunama radio programme. She then joined the cultural troupe as a Kunama language singer. In the late 1980s, Faytinga was reassigned to the public administration department in Kassala, Sudan and later Tokombia, where she was elected as member of the assembly of the National Union of Eritrean Women’s of Tokombia district.

== Career and musical style ==
In 1990, Faytinga toured the US and Europe as a member of The National Folkloric Troupe of Eritrea called the Sibrit Cultural Troupe. After releasing her first album “Sala Da Goda” on tape, she toured for the first time as a solo artist in 1995. Faytinga won the 2nd prize and 1st East African women singer at the 2000 Ma’ Africa in Benoni, South Africa. It took until 1999 and an appearance at the Africolor festival in France, before she could record her first album "Numey".

Faytinga composes her own songs and also interprets work from well-known poets and composers from Eritrea. When singing, she plays the krar, a small lyre.

The CD album "Numey" is Faytinga's first international release on the Paris-based Cobalt label. All of the songs on this album of hers are in her native Kunama language, which belongs to the Nilo-Saharan family.

In 2003, Faytinga released her second album "Eritrea". Besides the krar and wata, she also brought guitar, flute, and percussion sounds.

In 2022, she worked with jazz musician Hermon Mehari for the recording of his new album "Asmara" released on the KOMOS JAZZ label. The album includes two of her songs, "Tanafaqit" and "Milobe - Lawa Furda".

Faytinga has always been interested in music and developed her style ‘in the field’ that represents her own blend of several traditional music forms. She continues to release new single and music videos independently.

== World stage ==
Faytinga has been performing around the world representing Eritrea as a 'cultural ambassador' for her country. As Marco Cavallarin wrote in the Italian journal Africa e Mediterraneo, 'Faytinga interprets the profound culture of her country and its most ancient and more recent history, from the origins of the Kunama people to the war of liberation from the invading Ethiopia'. She participated in particular to Expo 2005 in Aichi, Japan and to Expo 2010 in Shanghai, China. She also attended the Earth Summit 2002 held in Johannesburg, South Africa. In 2022-2023, following the release of trumpeter Hermon Mehari's album "Asmara", she performed on stage with him in renowned jazz festivals in France and Switzerland, such as the Rencontres trans musicales in Rennes, Jazz en Nord in the Hauts de France, Les Rendez-vous de l'Erdre in Nantes and the Scène Ella Fitzgerald in Geneva.

In addition, she has been collaborated with other artists such as the group Ouï-Dire in an attempt to mix her voice, her music and culture with that of other continents.

Faytinga's music or photos are featured in various books, expositions, blogs, video documentaries, and other.

On 30 August 2004, in an interview with Joel Savage for The Voice Magazine she said that “I sing about peace, love, and togetherness, since war, conflict and other disturbances did not bring any positive change to Africa, but it only creates refugee crisis, pains, agony, discomfort and economic hardship. I bring a music of hope to the people.” With this spirit Faytinga played at the FLOG International music Festival in Florence (2004).

== Discography ==
=== Albums ===
- Salada Godda (also spelled Sala Da Goda) (1997, cassette) — Her first album, released on tape. This is the early foundation of her recording career. It introduced her songwriting and traditional musical style, with much of the repertoire in Kunama. The song “Asha’aley,” revisited in a remix in 2025, dates back to this period.
- Numey - Cobalt Records, January 2000. Her first internationally released album. It is a key testimony of her Kunama musical heritage. All ten tracks are sung in Kunama, and the album draws on traditional melodies and instrumentation while allowing her distinctive voice to take centre stage. Tracklist: "Numey"; "Milobe"; "Amajo"; "Lagàla Fàla Fesso"; "Kundura"; "Aleyda"; "Alemuye"; "Milomala"; "Asàmen Gàna"; "Salada Goda".
- Eritrea - Cobalt Records, November 2003. Her second major international album. Alongside traditional Eritrean instruments such as the krar and wata, Faytinga incorporates guitar, flute and percussion, giving the music a richer, more varied arrangement. Tracklist: "Goda Anna"; "Hakuma Tia"; "Degsi"; "Leledia"; "Eritrea"; "Amajo"; "Laganga"; "Alemuye"; "Taham Bele"; "Sema 'Ett"; "Buba".

These remain her primary full-length studio albums. Popular tracks from them (such as “Alemuye,” “Degsi,” “Amajo,” and “Goda Anna”) continue to circulate widely.

=== Notable singles and later releases ===
After the early 2000s albums, Faytinga has mainly released independent digital singles, many with accompanying music videos. Key ones include: "Megesha" and "Ciao, Ciao" (2012); "Sebaki Fkri" and "Son of Asmara" (2014); "Besela" (2016) — a more intimate song, sung in Tigrinya, about a woman who has been hurt by her partner. Its narrative moves from emotional pain towards forgiveness, showing Faytinga's interest in personal storytelling as well as cultural themes; "Deglele" (2018); "Kebkeba Kone" (2017) — a popular wedding song; "Lebam U Zdle", and "Goda Anna (Remix)" (2019); "Tsela’ika" (2021) — a song that reflects on the experiences of young Eritreans in the diaspora; "Fishaley" (2022); "Erey" (2025) — a song that captures the essence of Eritrea’s journey, one marked by struggle, but also by unbreakable hope and love for the nation. It reflects a longing for justice, freedom, and the return of prosperity, painting a vision of Eritrea rising from hardship to a future of democracy and unity; "Asha’aley (Remix)" (single in 2025 and music video in 2026); "Gual Salasa" (single, 2026).

=== Collaborations and international appearances ===
"Laganga with Laroz" — 2021. Released on the Miombo EP through Sol Selectas, this collaboration brought Faytinga's vocals into a contemporary electronic and global dance-music context. The release also included a remix by Rodrigo Gallardo, showing how her traditional vocal style can work beyond conventional folk arrangements.

“Resolution Song (Eritrea)” with Temesghen Yared — 2022. Created for the international World on Our Shoulders project, this Eritrean version adapts a global song about collective responsibility and protecting the planet. The lyrics were translated and adapted into Tigrinya, with an Eritrean musical arrangement.

Hermon Mehari — Asmara (2022). Faytinga contributed vocals to this project by jazz trumpeter Hermon Mehari, including “Tenafaqit” and “Milobe – Lawa Furda.” The collaboration connects Eritrean musical heritage with a jazz-oriented interpretation of the country's cultural roots.

She has also appeared on World Divas (2006), the Africolor compilation (2008), and The Asmara All Stars: Eritrea's Got Soul (2010), contributing tracks including “Lagàla Fàla Fesso,” “Hakuma Tia,” “Amajo,” and “Gwaila International".

== Advocacy ==
Faytinga singing on 10 December 2013 at UNAIDS Headquarters in Geneva, on the occasion of the opening of the Namibia gender-based violence Art Exhibition

Faytinga is one of the first artists from Eritrea engaged in support of people living with HIV and AIDS. She has participated in numerous World AIDS Day events including as guest-star singer on 1 December 2003 during the event held at the Hotel Intercontinental, and in June 2005, together with Kenyan singer Achieng Abura in an exceptional gala diner concert for the benefit of women and children affected by HIV and AIDS. She also performed on the occasion of the opening of the Namibia gender-based violence Art Exhibition on 10 December 2013 at UNAIDS Headquarters in Geneva.

In 2022, together with Eritrean musician and singer Temesghen Yared, she developed an Eritrean version of the “World on Our Shoulders” song, also called the “Resolution Song”. The Resolution Song brings together voices from all over the world in a demonstration of global unity and a call for action to protect the planet. The Eritrean version of this song is featured with 16 other versions in the "Resolution Song" album released on Earth Day, 22 April 2022.

== See also ==
- Music of Eritrea
