= Semhar Araia =

American lawyer

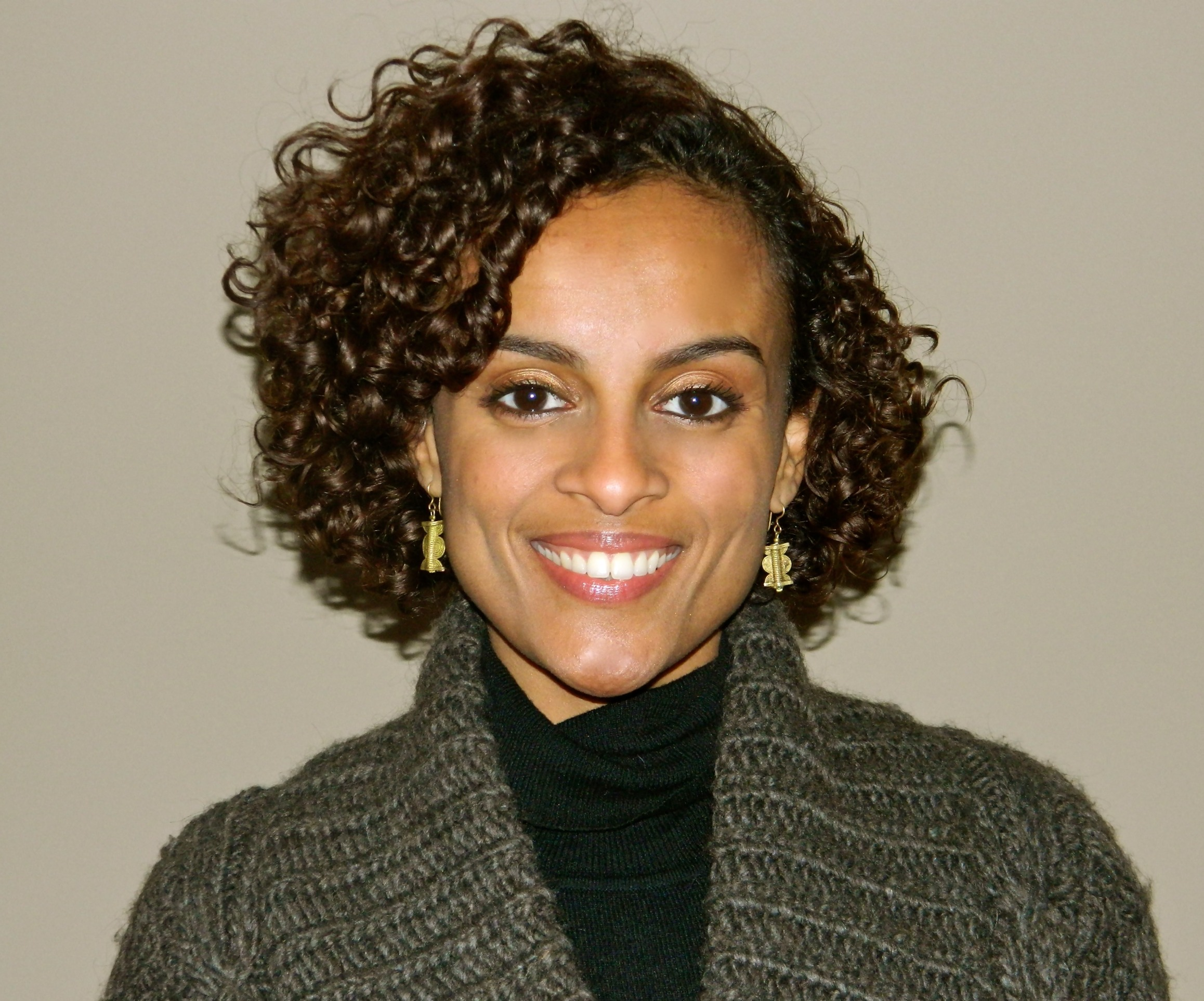
- Born: 1978 or 1979 (age 46–47); New York City, United States
- Education: University of Saint Thomas; Marquette University Law School
- Occupations: Lawyer, professor, activist
- Title: Founder and Executive Director of DAWN

Semhar Araia is an Eritrean American social activist, professor and international lawyer. She is the founder and executive director of the Diaspora African Women's Network (DAWN) non-governmental organization. Semhar was recently appointed as UNICEF USA Managing Director of Diaspora and Multicultural Partnership.

== Personal life ==
Araia was born between 1978 and 1979 in New York City to immigrants from Eritrea. Her parents had emigrated to the United States in the late 1960s for education and work. She was named after the coastal Eritrean province of Semhar.

For her post-secondary studies, Araia earned a bachelor's degree from the University of Saint Thomas in Saint Paul, Minnesota. She was subsequently admitted to the University of Michigan and American University law schools, but opted instead to attend the Marquette University Law School in Wisconsin in order to remain closer to her family. Araia later worked toward and received a J.D. degree from the institution in 1999.

== Career ==
Professionally, Araia has a background in international law. She served as a foreign policy analyst in the United States Congress, and has over a decade of work experience in public policy, U.S.-Africa foreign policy, international humanitarian law and conflict resolution.

Araia worked as an attorney for the Eritrea-Ethiopia Claims Commission, which was established to implement the 2000 Algiers Agreement between the governments of Eritrea and Ethiopia in the wake of the Eritrean–Ethiopian War. She was also an Africa analyst for The Elders.

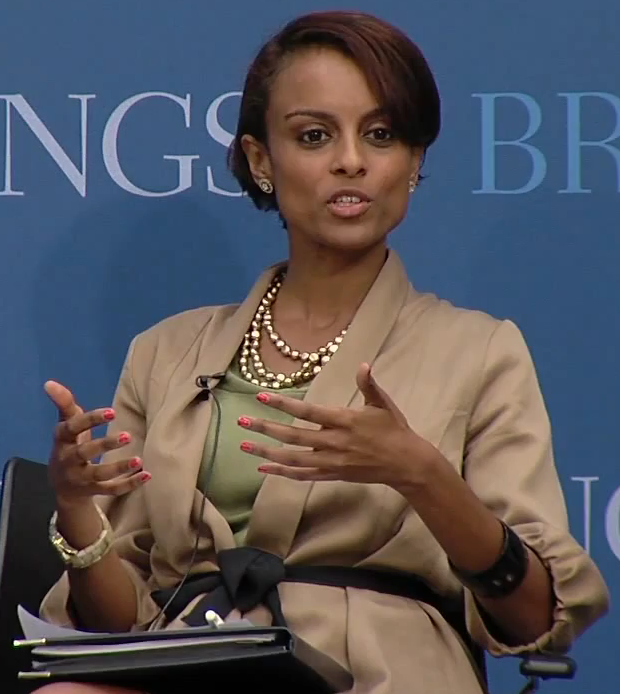
Araia speaking on the Somalia peace process at the Brookings Institution in Washington, D.C. (2011).

Araia's main area of focus has been on providing accurate information and clarifying misconceptions regarding the Horn of Africa region and its diaspora. She has also encouraged expatriates to re-invest in Africa's development through leadership, organizations and especially the remittance system. In this capacity, she founded and serves as the executive director of the Diaspora African Women's Network (DAWN), a non-governmental organization based in Washington, D.C. whose mission is to develop and support talented female immigrants from Africa. It presently has 180 members representing various places around the world.

Additionally, Araia serves as the Horn of Africa regional advisor for Oxfam International. She is a board member of the Africans in the Diaspora (AiD) organization, which focuses on development in Africa through engaging local communities as well as expatriates.

Araia has also served as a member of the Obama-Biden Presidential Transition Team. She is likewise an original founder of the IMPACT non-profit organization.

In addition, Araia has been featured as a guest speaker in various schools, universities, media outlets and other audiences on U.S.-Africa policy and effective campaign organizing and advocacy strategies.

Presently, she teaches a course on "Conflict and Peace in the Horn of Africa" at the University of Minnesota.

On 23 May 2024, Araia was among the guests invited to the state dinner hosted by U.S. President Joe Biden in honor of President William Ruto at the White House.

== Awards ==
In April 2012, Araia was honored by the White House as its 2012 Champion of Change for her work with DAWN. The organization was additionally presented the Diaspora African Forum Bridge Builder Award by the African Union.

In 2013, Araia was also selected as the AU's Diaspora Awardee of the Year.
