= Jemal Abdu =

Eritrean footballer

Jamal Abdu
Personal information
- Full name: Jemal Abdu Mahamud
- Date of birth: 2 July 1992 (age 34)
- Place of birth: Asmara, Eritrea
- Position: Midfielder

Senior career*
Years	Team	Apps	(Gls)
2011–2012	Croydon Kings	13	(0)
2012–2013	Adelaide Comets	7	(0)
2013–2014	Western Strikers	36	(1)

International career
2009	Eritrea	1	(0)
- * Club domestic league appearances and goals

Jemal Abdu (born 2 July 1992) is an Eritrean former footballer who played as a midfielder.

== Club career ==
In 2011, he signed with FFSA Super League club Croydon Kings after being granted political asylum by the Australian government.

== International career ==
Abdu played in the 2009 CECAFA Cup in Kenya, appearing in the 2–1 group match defeat to Rwanda.

== Personal life ==
Whilst competing in the 2009 CECAFA Cup in Kenya he was part of the Eritrea national football team which failed to return home after competing in the regional tournament in Nairobi. After receiving political asylum from the Australian government, the team moved to Adelaide, Australia.
