= Kisanet Tedros =

Eritrean educational entrepreneur

- Born: 20th century
- Occupation: entrepreneur
- Known for: support for Tigrinya language and culture

Kisanet Tedros is an Eritrean educational entrepreneur. She operates from Uganda where she supports her country's diaspora, the Tigrinya language and its culture. She was identified as one of the BBC's 100 Inspirational Women in 2022.

== Life ==
Tedros was born and brought up in Eritrea where she learned the Tigrinya language which is spoken by the Tigrinya and Tigrayan people of Eritrea, of the Tigray Region and of northern Ethiopia.

Tedros operates from Uganda where she supports her country's diaspora. Tedros has created Beles Bubu a YouTube channel that creates videos for Eritrean children. The videos are in the Tigrinya language and are intended to support children from Eritrea and Ethiopia. Tedros sees this as an important connect for children and their parents. The content is created from a self-taught team from Uganda as less as Eritrea and the Democratic Republic of Congo.

Tedros was identified as one of the BBC's 100 Women in 2022 in a list that included Olena Zelenska, Billie Eilish, Priyanka Chopra Jonas and Yulimar Rojas. She is one of the volunteers for an organisation called Mahtsen who support people from Ethiopia and Eritrea.

In 2023 a conference was organised by the Ugandan President's office. Abbey Walusimbi who is a Presidential adviser and ambassador created what was said to be the First Eritrean Diaspora Investment Conference. Tedros was appreciative and noted that the conference was about business and not politics. Uganda had been welcoming to the Eritrean immigrants and the conference would allow them access to Ugandan officials. The conferences guests included the 3rd Deputy Prime Minister Lukia Isanga Nakadama who welcomed the link between Eritrea and Uganda.
