= Azazet Habtezghi Kidane =

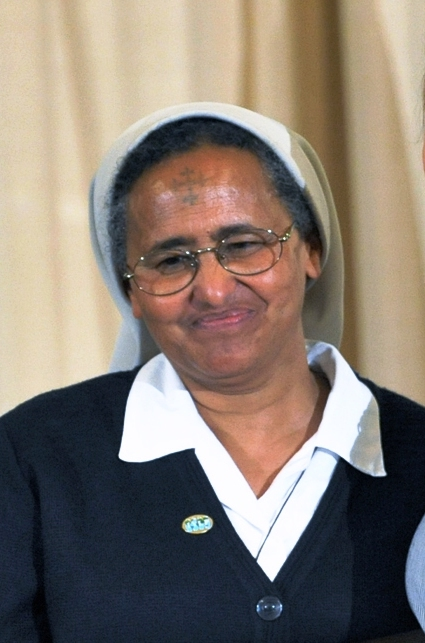
- Kidane in 2012
- Born: Eritrea
- Other name: Sister Aziza
- Known for: Work with refugees in Israel
- Awards: US Department of State "Hero Acting to End Modern Slavery"

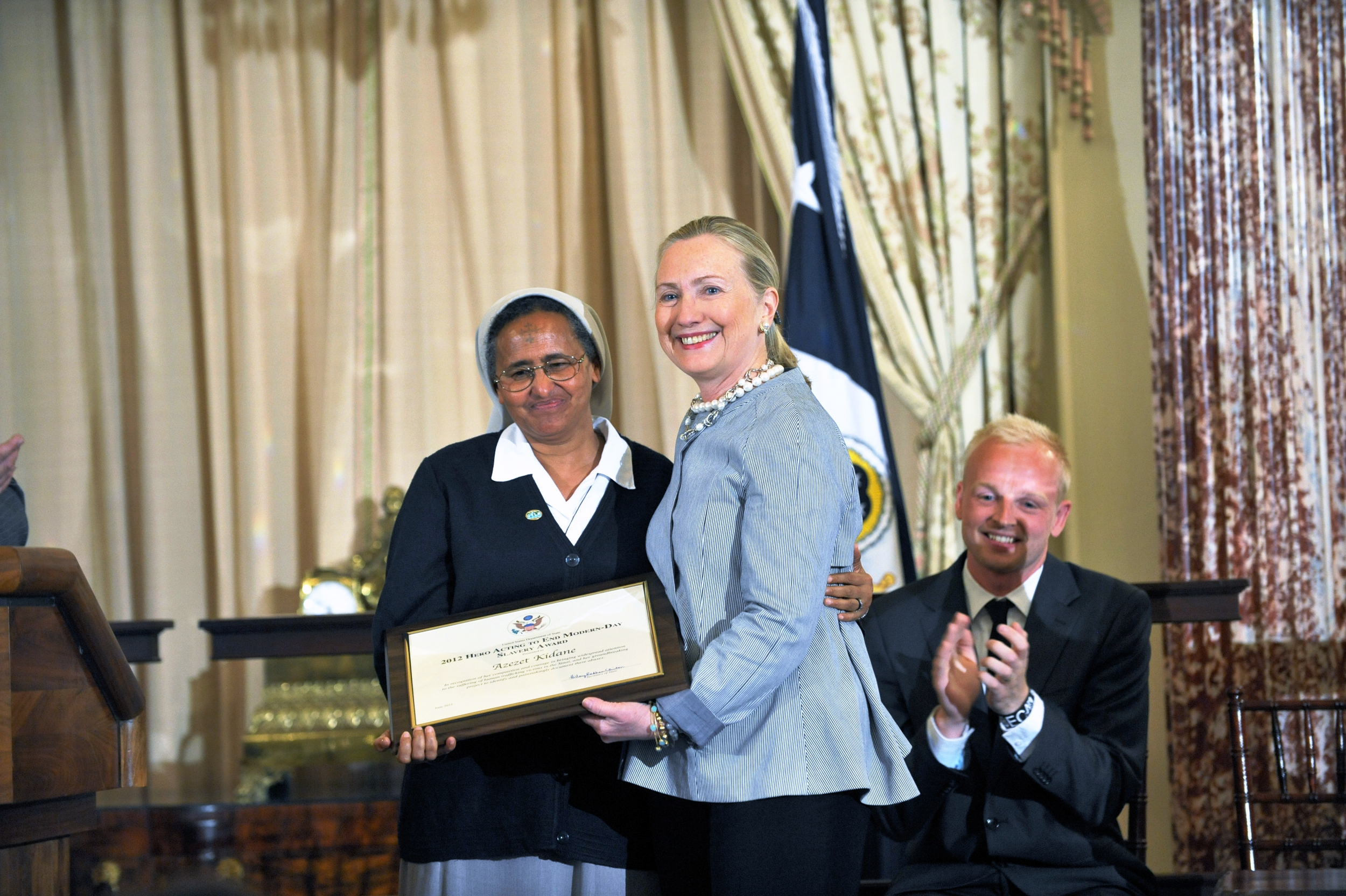
With Hillary Clinton

Azezet Habtezghi Kidane is an Eritrean-born British nun and human trafficking activist working in Israel.

== Career ==
Azezet Habtezghi Kidane, also known as Sister Aziza, was born in Eritrea and is now a British citizen. She worked as a nurse in Sudan and Ethiopia for 20 years and is a member of the Comboni Missionary Sisters.

From 2010 Kidane began working as a nurse at an open clinic in Tel Aviv run by the Physicians for Human Rights-Israel. The clinic provided free healthcare to African refugees who had made the journey to Israel via the Sinai Peninsula. Kidane noticed that many of the refugees had suffered from enslavement, human trafficking and torture on their journeys and began recording this in a database. In all she took testimonies from more than 1,500 refugees using a questionnaire of her own design. The reports she compiled were passed to the Israeli police, US Department of State, the European Union and the United Nations.

Kidane discovered that a network of torture camps existed in the Sinai that were used by people smugglers to extort money from the refugees. Around half of the refugees she interviewed had experienced these camps. The smugglers would force the refugees to call their families in Israel or Africa and torture them whilst they were listening in order to demand ransoms of up to $50,000.

A fence built by the Israeli government in 2013 almost completely halted the flow of African migrants. Kidane now works to provide counselling to those already in Israel. Kidane co-founded Kuchinate, African Refugee Women's collective together with Dr Diddy Mymin. This collective provides economic, psychological and social empowerment. The collective makes and sells beautiful crocheted homewares and also take part in art collaborations to raise awareness about the plight of asylum seekers. Kidane is well known in the African community in Israel. She was awarded a Trafficking in People Report Hero Acting to End Modern Slavery award by the US Department of State in 2012, which was presented by Secretary of State Hillary Clinton.
