= EriAm Sisters =

Eritrean-American musical group

The EriAm Sisters
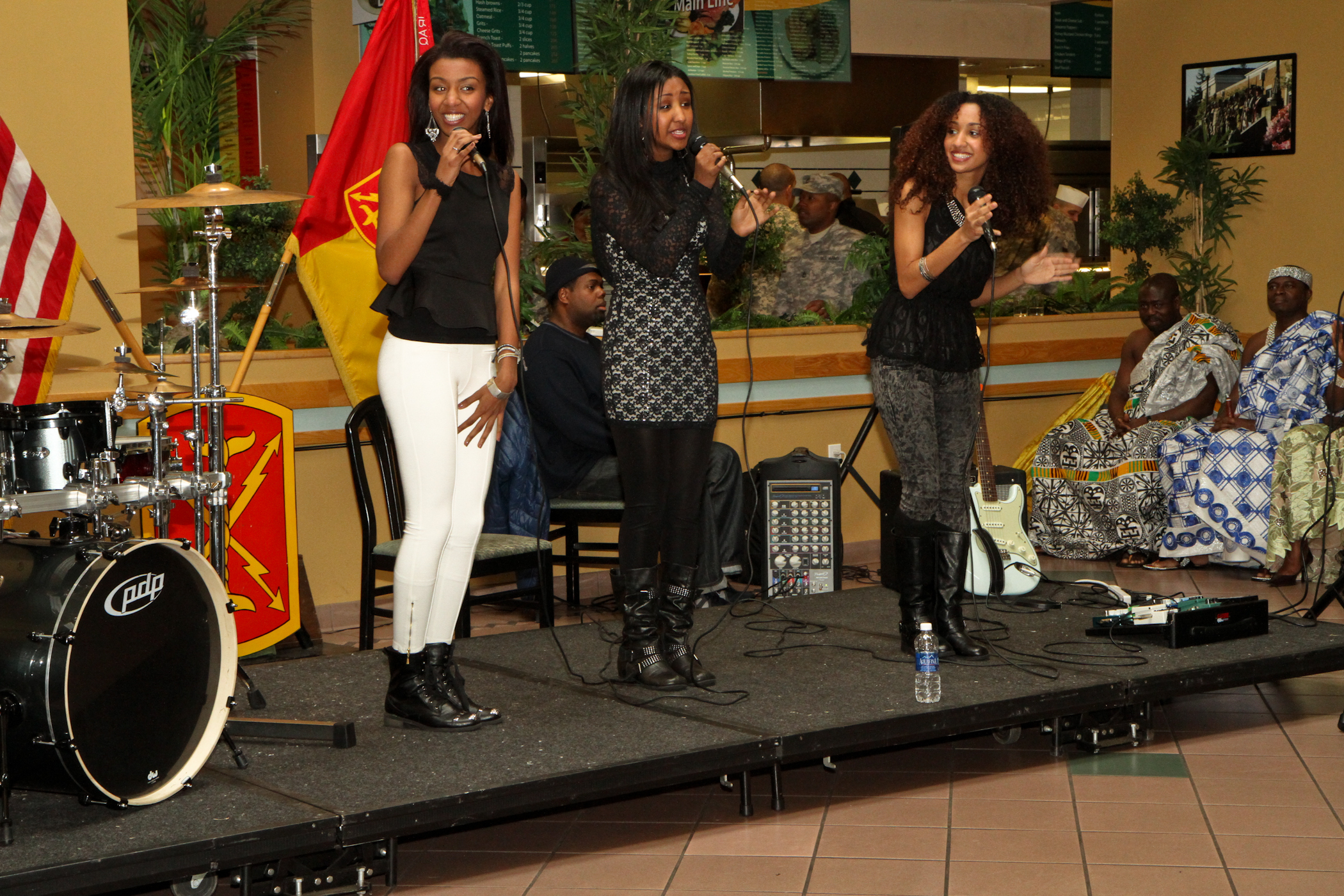

Background information
- Origin: Eritrea
- Genres: Pop/Rock/R&B
- Years active: 2009-present
- Labels: Unsigned
- Members: Haben Abraham; Salina Abraham; Lianda Abraham

The EriAm Sisters are an Eritrean American musical group consisting of three sisters.

== Early years ==
The EriAm Sisters, short for "Eritrean American Sisters", consist of three sisters: Haben, Salina and Lianda. Salina and Lianda were born in Amsterdam, the Netherlands, and Haben was born in Seattle, United States. Their parents are from Eritrea, and their father Mulugheta Abraham was a musician back home. The sisters were raised with music as an integral part of their life. After few years of singing at home for family members, they posted their songs on YouTube. Soon, the first invitation to perform in public was received. The youngest Haben was invited to sing at an event at Disney World in Orlando (25th anniversary of Children Miracle Network). Soon after, the youngest sister appeared on Maury Povich TV show as one of the six America's most Talented kids. That is when the sisters decided to take music seriously.

== Professional career ==
The EriAm Sisters became known after their appearance on America's Got Talent 2009. There, they sang the Jackson 5's song "I Want You Back" which aired just a day before he died. The sisters were seen as the next Destiny's Child by the judges of America Got Talent. Specifically Piers Morgan was very pleased and told the girls "You are the future". He said this after the girls performed the song "Crazy in Love" by Beyoncé.

Although their name was known mainly because of America's Got Talent, the girls were performing for years together. Some of the songs they recorded are when Haben was only 8 years old.

== Awards ==
- In 2009, the Seattle Theater Group featured the girls as the best young artists of 2009.
- After becoming semifinalists on Americas Got Talent, Mayor Denis Law handed the girls a key to the city and declared September 21 to be the EriAm Sisters Day in Renton, Washington for their extraordinary contribution to music at such a young age. They are also admired for their contribution to support many local charity organizations.
- In 2010, the sisters received a music award from the King county executives for Excellence in Music".

== Tours and discography ==
- The EriAm Sisters' first major concert was in Montgomery (Alabama) on May 28 at the Jubilee festival.
- The King 5 TV show
- "new day" reported that in the summer of 2010, the EriAm Sisters conducted for the first time a limited international tour including the cities Stockholm, Asmara, Sawa, Washington D.C, Oakland, Salt Lake City and Montgomery.
- In the summer of 2011 to Frankfurt, Stockholm, Oakland and appeared on many local shows. On May 24, 2011, they flew to Eritrea to perform at the 20th anniversary of the country's independence.

The girls are believed to work with multi-platinum producer Andrew Lane and DJ Steve Freestyle who is the official DJ of Timbaland. They released a couple original songs, including "BFF" and "Diary". The song "Diary" is written by the then 12-year-old member (Haben Abraham) and made it to number one on Hot Radio 105.7 for 5 weeks. The song apparently was not formally released but leaked to radio stations. Without any promotional effort the song couldn't keep the momentum and dropped off the radio chart after 9 weeks. They also wrote a song called "No More" about sisterhood love which was widely seen as an indication of the love the girls have for each other. The youngest Haben has posted many of her original work, including music production on their YouTube account. The EriAm Sisters also released a rendition of "I Want You Back" on August 29, 2011, under the label KingdomGate Music Group.

== See also ==
- Ruth Abraha
