= Abdalla Jabir =

Eritrean politician

- Born: Eritrea
- Occupation: Politician
- Title: Head of Organizational Affairs at the People's Front for Democracy and Justice

Abdalla Jabir (ዓብደላ ጃብር) is an Eritrean politician. He was the Head of Organizational Affairs at the People's Front for Democracy and Justice, Eritrea's ruling and sole political party, also being an advisor to the President Isaias Afwerki. He is now in prison due to a connection with the 20 January 2013 coup against Afwerki.
