= Abdulkadir Kebire =

Personal details
- Born: 1902 Massawa, Italian Eritrea
- Died: 27 March 1949 (aged 46–47) Asmara, British Military Administration (Eritrea)

Abdulkadir Mohamed Saleh Kebire was an Eritrean political figure born in 1902 at Desiet Island around Massawa.

== Early life ==
Born near Massawa in 1902, he is a descendant of the Kabiri family.

At a young age he went to Khalwa (Quranic school) where he studied the Quran and Arabic. Later, he attended primary school and graduated from the fourth grade. At the time in Italian Eritrea, no indigenous native was allowed to continue education beyond the 4th grade. At the age of 18, Abdulkadir left for Egypt to pursue further education. While there, he was influenced by events such as the revolution of Saad Zeqlul against the British.

== Political life ==
Returning to Eritrea from Egypt, Abdulkadir worked as a writer in the cities of Asmara and Massawa, and as translator for the Italian delegation to Hodeida in Yemen.

Some Eritrean biographical sources claim that during his service in the Arabian Peninsula in the early 1930s, Kebire participated in a delegation involved in efforts to mediate a border disagreement between Saudi Arabia and Yemen. According to these accounts, the delegation included prominent Arab intellectuals such as Hajj Amin al-Husayni, Hashim al-Atassi, and Shakib Arslan, and Kebire is said to have developed a personal friendship with the Saudi prince, later King, Faisal bin Abdulaziz, who reportedly nicknamed him al-Massawī (“the one from Massawa”). However, these claims are not corroborated by independent academic or diplomatic histories of the 1934 Saudi–Yemeni War and following border disputes, which do not list Abdulkadir Kebire among the participants.

Following the defeat of Italian forces at the Battle of Keren during the Second World War, on 5 May 1941 Abdulkadir co-founded and became one of the executive leaders of Mahber Fikri Hager (Association of Love of Country), which was seeking social, economic, and legal rights for Eritreans. Mahber Fikri Hager leadership was composed of twelve members of whom six were Muslims.

After the war, Mahber Fikri Hager called for a peaceful demonstration. Around 3000-4000 people had gathered to take part. They marched to the governor's palace in Asmara where the military administrator of Eritrea, Brigadier General Kennedy Cooke, lived. The demonstrators demanded to communicate through their leaders from the Mahber Fikri Hager. Because of his educational background and nationalistic feelings, Abdulkadir was selected to represent the people of Asmara before Brigadier General Cooke.

Approaching the British military authorities, Abdulkadir forwarded a ‘welcome’ speech and proceeded systematically to remind the British of their wartime promises of freedom and self-determination. He also explained that the people of Eritrea were awaiting their response with optimism. However, Cooke's reply was discouraging and degrading,

I have heard what you’ve said, but what you have just done is illegal. Now I want you to disperse and I command you not to repeat any demonstration or gathering without the permission of the authorities.

== Eritrean independence ==
In 1946, aware of Ethiopian ambitions to incorporate Eritrea, nationalist Eritreans, including Abdulkadir Kebire, organized a meeting known as the Wa’ela Biet Ghergis (“Treaty of Biet Ghergis”) in November. The meeting aimed to maintain unity within Eritrean nationalist groups and consider the possibility of conditional approaches to union with Ethiopia. While the first meeting achieved some coordination among nationalist groups, subsequent meetings did not reach a lasting agreement.

In December 1946, the Muslim League, commonly referred to as Al Rabita, was founded in Keren. Abdulkadir Kebire, Sheikh Ibrahim Sultan, Haji Suleiman Ahmed, and other individuals were among its founders. Kebire represented Al Rabita at public meetings and political gatherings to present the party’s positions, which included advocating for Eritrean independence and the promotion of education as a means of political empowerment.

== United Nations and Assassination ==
When the United Nations sent its inquiry commission to Eritrea to determine the country’s political future, Abdulkadir Kebire appeared with five other leaders of Al Rabita , representing the party’s firm support for Eritrean independence. In March 1949, the UN invited leaders of Eritrea’s major political parties to present their views at the Lake Success sessions in New York. Each party selected its delegates, and Abdulkadir was appointed to Al Rabita’s delegation.

At the time, Eritrea was politically divided between independence-oriented groups, largely led by Muslim intellectuals like Kebire, and pro-unionist factions favoring union with Ethiopia, often supported by external actors. Fearing the influence of Kebire’s speeches and the support he could carry at the UN, pro-unionist opponents assassinated him on 27 March 1949 in Asmara, then under British Military Administration . He was pronounced dead three days later, on 29 March. According to accounts, his killer, a known thug in Asmara, was sent to Harar in Ethiopia, where he reportedly lived until his death.

== Reaction to Assassination and Legacy ==
Kebire’s death left a profound gap in the independence movement. Fellow advocates highlighted his central role: Omar Qadi, a lawyer and independence activist, described Kebire as the “brightest lawyer” lost to the movement, Nationalist Leader Ibrahim Sultan referred to him as his “right hand,”. Scholars note that his assassination illustrated the intensity of Eritrea’s internal political divisions and underscored the lengths to which pro-unionist factions went to suppress the independence movement. Kebire’s commitment, vision, and untimely death became symbolic in the emerging Eritrean nationalist narrative.

On his second memorial celebration, Sheikh Ahmed Saleh Basaac gave the following eulogy,

"Indeed, this spirit for freedom, self-esteem, and self-determination was maintained throughout Eritrea’s struggle for independence and still survives in the memory of every Eritrean. Abdulkadir is revered as one of the symbols of that sacrifice."
