= Music of Eritrea =

Eritrean music
- Cultural origins: Eritrea
- Typical instruments: Krar; masenqo; saxophone; washint; begena

Subgenres
- Zema / Ethiopian-Eritrean Christian Liturgical Chant

Other topics
- Music of Ethiopia

The music of Eritrea, is a diverse mix of traditional and popular styles originating from ancient to modern times. The nine major ethnic groups of Eritrea—Afar, Bilen, Hedareb, Kunama, Nara, Rashaida, Saho, Tigre and Tigrinya—celebrate autonomous music-making expressed through a rich heritage of vocalists, instrumentalists and activities within the country and throughout the international diaspora. The country's music is informed by a range of ethnolinguistic group dynamics in the region, by its shared pre-colonial history with and revolutionized independence from Ethiopia, and by its exposure to globalized American music in the mid-twentieth century.

== Notable musicians ==
Notable Eritrean musicians were Edris Wad Amir, Ibrahim Wad Goret, Edris M. Ali, Zainab Bashir, Fatima Ibrahim, Engineer Asgedom Woldemichael, Wad Asheikh, Yemane Baria, Osman Abderrehim, Alamin Abdeletif and Atowe Birhan Segid. Yemane Baria wrote one political song, and he was in jail. Also of note is Bereket Mengistab, who has had a lengthy career, and 1960s musicians Haile Ghebru and Tewolde Redda.

Modern popular stars include Wad Asheikh, Saeed salih, Fatima Ibrahim, Teklé Tesfa-Ezighe, Tekle Kiflemariam Wedi Tukul, Tesfai Mehari (Fihira), Osman Abderrehim, Abrar Osman, Abraham Afwerki, Yemane Ghebremichael, Alamin Abdeletif, Atewebrhan Segid, and Tsehaytu Beraki.

== Folk music ==
Folk musicians used traditional instruments include the stringed kraar, kebero, lyre. Tesfuy Mehari Fihira and Wedi Sheik were notable folk musicians.

== Popular music ==
Modern Eritrean popular music can be traced back to the late 1960s, when the MaHber Theatre Asmara began to produce stars like Osman Abderrehim, Alamin Abdeletif, Yemane Ghebremichael (commonly known as Yemane Baria), Jabber, Ateweberhan Seghid, Yonus Ibrahim, Tsehaytu Beraki, Tewolde Redda, Teberh Tesfahiwet and Tukabo Weldemariam.

Since then, some musicians, like kraar-player Dawit Shilan, Yohannes Tikabo (also known as Wedi Tukabo), Dehab Faytinga (commonly known as Faytinga), the Asmara All Stars and Temesgen Gebreselassie (also known as Taniqo) have helped to incorporate the core indigenous Eritrean musical elements in popular music.

== Dancing ==
Traditional Eritrean Tigrinya dancing involves two main styles of dance. In the first which is called 'quda', the dancers form a circle and slowly circumambulator or move around in an endless circular motion to the rhythm of the music. Then, they cease the circular musical flow/motion and dance in pairs or 3's facing each other for a short while before resuming the circular motion in a file again. During this time, they shuffle their feet to the beat of the music and bob their shoulders in a rhythmic fashion. Female dancers usually move their shoulders more than the male dancers. The dancers round off their dancing by facing each other in twos and threes and moving their shoulders faster. This can also involve jumping and bending one's knees, as well as going down to the floor to sit in a squatting position while bobbing those shoulders and moving the head sideways to the strong drum beats.

In the second style of dance, two groups (often a group of men and a group of women) line up and face each other. The dance features a skipping step to the music. Periodically, the two groups will change places, dancing across the floor and passing each other in the process.

Traditional dances practiced by Eritrea's other Afro-Asiatic communities include those by the Saho, which involve jumping on each leg in rhythm with the beat. The related Afar, Tigre, Bilen and Hidareb have similar moves. Additionally, the Rashaida also have their own unique dances.

Dancing by the Nilo-Saharan Kunama involves raising bead-strung legs in sync with the rhythm of the music. The related Nara have similar traditions.

== Live music: piano bars ==
The music scene in the Eritrean capital of Asmara has traditionally been known for setting the standard of Tigrinya music for listeners in Eritrea and Ethiopia. The relatively recent 'piano bar' phenomenon has been largely exclusive to Asmara because almost all contemporary musicians and singers live in the capital city.

The piano bar culture became popular around 2004, when leading singers such as Dawit Shilan played at the Ha.Ko.Se.E cafe. At the time - live music in bars being a new experience in the city - the cafe was overcrowded over weekends and many customers had to be turned away.

One of the intrinsic characteristics of the piano bars is that the artists remix a range of classic hits, instead of sticking to performing only their own songs. For example, Dawit Shilan playing Atewebrhan Segid's 1970s jazz not only brought these classic song back to life, but showed his mastery of performance skills, particularly on the krar.

Piano bars have thus provided a platform for jazz and blues artists - and to a lesser extent the local dance music known as Guayla. They have become sites for musicians to show their artistry, as they are not bound by the typical demands for upbeat music for dancing.

After the success of gigs at the Ha.Ko.Se.E piano bar, other hotels and cafes were quick to catch on the business. Hotels such as Sunshine, Savana, Bologna cub and Ayele family have been hosting contemporary favourites such as Yohannes Tikabo, Tesfay Mengesha and Kahsai Haile regularly.

In 2013, the Berhe Aiba Hotel started a new type of live performance by giving prominence to musicians rather than singers. Jazz classics were played, with singers such as Yohannes Tikabo only featuring on certain songs. Some of the best talents in Eritrean music - like Shonqie, Fanjai, Chobie and Gidewon - were brought together as a band to provide a unique experience. The place became a hangout for many musicians, who would get often on stage and jam.

The success of piano bars in Asmara could also be connected with the Gaeda genre, which is played in Swa houses in Aba Shawel, a district of Asmara that has traditionally been home to many notable artists across generations. Gaeda is a communal music experience where a singer plays songs accompanied by friends beating drums, clapping and singing along. Many of these songs are exclusively played in Gaeda settings and are never recorded or released on albums. Songs are often modified by whoever sings them, adding thought-provoking social and political messages.

== Sibrit ==
In 1994, a year after Eritrea declared its independence and gained international recognition, a group of musicians were brought together under the direction of Kahsay Gebrehewet as part of Eritrea's nation building efforts. The musicians, who had previously performed in various revolutionary music groups, were brought together as the national music and dance troupe, Sibrit, which means "heritage". Sibrit perform music and dance from all nine of Eritrea's main ethnic groups (Afar, Bilen, Hedareb, Saho, Kunama, Nara, Rashaida, Tigre and Tigrinya), they feature regularly on Eritrean radio and television shows and perform as representatives of Eritrean culture around the world. Their instrumentation includes the amplified krar, bass krar and percussion.
