= Abraham Kidane =

Eritrean politician

Abraham Kidane is the senior economic advisor to the Government of Eritrea and to the Ministry of National Development. He received his PhD in economics from the University of California, Los Angeles. After teaching at the University of Southern California, Pepperdine University, and the California State University, Dominguez Hills), he returned to his country of birth in 1995 to work for the Eritrean government. Kidane works at the Ministry of National Development, having previously held positions at the Bank of Eritrea and at the Office of the President.
