= Abraham Afewerki =

Abraham Afewerki ኣብርሃም ኣፈወርቂ
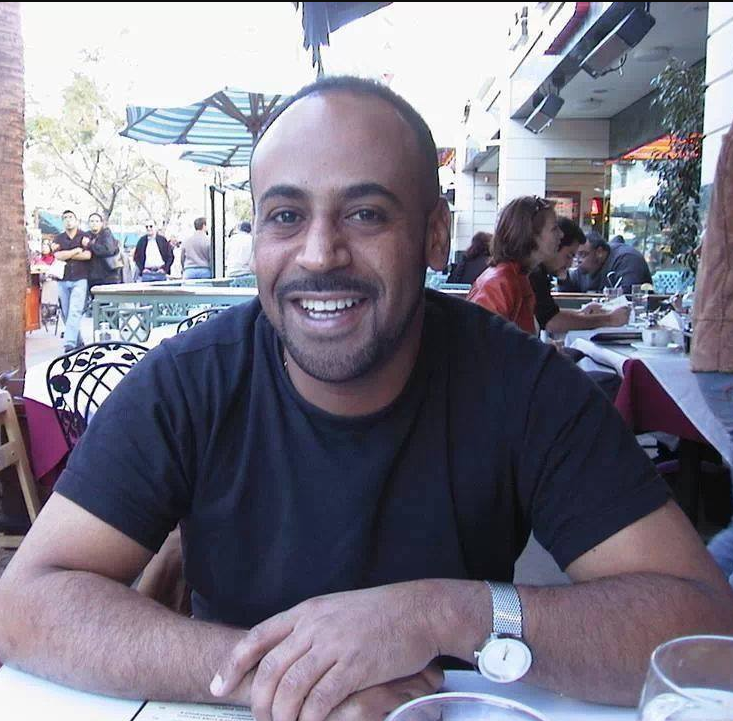
- Abraham at a cafe in 2006.

Background information
- Born: 30 January 1966; Asmara, Ethiopia
- Died: 7 October 2006 (aged 40) Massawa, Eritrea
- Genre: Eritrean
- Years active: 1979–2006
- Labels: Virgin Records, Negarit Productions

Abraham Afewerki, (Tigrinya: ኣብርሃም ኣፈወርቂ) (30 January 1966 – 7 October 2006) was an Eritrean singer, songwriter, and music producer. Noted for his unique Tigrinya-based compositions and lyrics, he was one of the most recognized figures among Eritrean musicians and celebrities and also the world.

== Early life ==
Abraham Afewerki was born in 1966 in Asmara. During the Eritrean War of Independence, Abraham and his family fled the fighting and lived as refugees in Sudan. He was interested in music from an early age, taking up the harmonica. Abraham joined the Eritrean People's Liberation Front (EPLF) at the age of 12, as a member of a cultural troupe which toured areas controlled by the EPLF. He began writing his own songs and music regarding the war, performing them from 1979 onwards.

Abraham moved to Italy, where he learned to play the krar and continued to write songs in the theme of Eritrean nationalism. After several years, he moved to the United States where he studied for a bachelor's degree with honours.

== Music career ==
Abraham’s first release, Wegahta (Dawn), was released in 1991. During the following 15 years, Abraham released two more albums which further propelled his popularity among Eritreans. His songs were popular because his lyrics expressed strong and poetic images of Eritrea’s culture. His song "Abzelena Halina" ("Wherever We Are") became greatly popular in Eritrea and the world; his socially conscious words and evocative lyrics talked of the bravery of the nation.

In his final release, entitled Semai ("Sky" in Tigrinya), Abraham collaborates with several Eritrean musicians, the result of which was an exquisite sound. Abraham continued to blend his music with jazz, R&B, and Reggae rhythms at the same time maintaining his music’s originality and authenticity. One song from the album, "Semay" (also the title of the album), has become one of the popular songs in Eritrea.

== Death ==
In 2006, Abraham drowned in the Red Sea near Massawa. He had returned to Eritrea to produce a film musical. Posthumously, Abraham continues to be held in high regard by his fellow Eritrean artists, who bear much appreciation and respect. His musical influence has also spread to Ethiopia where his music is reproduced by other musicians singing in a different language other than his native Tigrinya.

== Discography ==
He released the following albums in Eritrea:

- 1991: Wegahta (Sunrise)
- 1994: Tesfa'iya snqey (Hope is my treasure)
- 1998: MsTir fQri (Secret of Love)
- 2000: Hadera (Promise)
- 2006: Semai (Sky)
