= Genet Sium =

Eritrean writer, activist, and nurse

Genet Sium (alternate spelling, Ganat Seyum; nickname, Shigom) is an Eritrean writer, activist, and nurse. She was an active member of the Eritrean People's Liberation Front (EPLF) during the war for Eritrean independence from Ethiopia. Her autobiographical novel Shigom recounts her experiences as a freedom fighter. She has subsequently written several works of fiction as well as texts on sexual and reproductive health.

== Early life ==
Genet Sium was born in Korbaria, in Eritrea's Southern Region, in the 1960s. Her mother was illiterate and fought for her daughters to receive the education she was denied. In 1975, when Genet was in sixth grade, she was forced to leave the region due to unrest. She was witness to horrific violence under the Derg regime, and her family's house was destroyed in a bombing.

In 1976, she was married to her schoolteacher. However, Genet became increasingly interested in joining the fight for Eritrean independence, and married women were not permitted to join the Eritrean People's Liberation Front (EPLF) at that time, so she insisted on a divorce shortly after they married.

== Eritrean War of Independence and Shigom ==
She joined the EPLF in 1977 and was assigned to help receive new women recruits in the Solomuna area, where she worked for 11 years. She was then transferred to the EPLF's central health station.

Genet's first writing project was a play about the disadvantages of traditional medicine, based on her own childhood experiences, that she wrote on finishing her training with the EPLF. In 1984, she began writing her first book, the autobiographical novel Shigom. She worried that she would be killed in the war before she would be able to finish it, but she completed it in 1987. She was subsequently given the nickname Shigom after the title character in the book.

A radio version of Shigom was produced on Radio Dimtsi Hafash in 1988.

== Postwar career ==
After the war ended and Eritrea gained independence in 1991, Genet went to nursing school and began working as a gynecologist. She continues to fight for gender equality and has held seminars on women and health care.

Genet went on to write several more books, including Aini-Titsum, a work of social commentary; the short story collections Enda-Zib’e and Cheka-Adi; and the health education texts Kolilkum Habuna and Tsegiat, which deal with HIV/AIDS and female anatomy, respectively. Her work has also included recording stories passed down through oral traditions in her community. Sium writes in Tigrinya and is actively involved in Eritrea's literary community.

== Selected works ==
- Šegom : ḥādgay ḥārenat ʼiyu!, 1991
- ʼEndā zebeʼi : salasta ḥāṣarti zāntātāt , 1998
- Ċeqā ʻādi : tarix hiwatāwi lebi walad, 2002
