= Mereb Estifanos =

Eritrean actress (born October 1983)

- Born: October 17, 1983 (age 43); Arareb, Ethiopia
- Occupation: Actress
- Years active: 2002-present

Arareb Eritrea

Mereb Estifanos (Tigrinya:መረብ እስቲፋኖስ) born 17 October 1983 is an Eritrean actress.

== Biography ==
Mereb was born on 17 October 1983 in Arareb, in the former province of Sahel (now part of the Northern Red Sea Region). She is the daughter of Estifanos Derar and Negesti Wolde-Mariam, both of whom were Eritrean People's Liberation Front militants. Mereb attended high school in Asmara. She described herself as a studious and quiet child, eager to get high marks in school. Mereb played volleyball in high school, but quit playing the sport to focus on acting.

Although initially aspiring to be a dancer or singer, in 2002 Fessehaye Lemlem, screenwriter for the film Fermeley, approached Mereb to act in his film. She was in grade 11 at the time and had no acting experience. After some initial hesitation, including trying to figure out if he was conning her, Mereb signed the contract to appear in the film. She played a university student who fell in love with another student, although their romance ended in tragedy. Following her role in the film, Mereb decided to give up her studies to focus on acting, though she made a resolution that if she was in any way dissatisfied with her acting she would return to her studies.

Mereb took a three-month course on acting from the Department of Cultural Affairs. She described her ideal role as that of a lover, though she usually played the part of a popular girl, and she cited Helen Meles as an influence. Mereb played Feruz in the TV serial Hareg, a girl with two lovers. She has performed in several other popular films, including Werasi Kidan, Gezie, Mezgeb, Shalom, Azmarino, Ketali Sehbet, and Fekri Tsa’iru. As of 2014, Mereb took part in 75 short and feature films.

== Partial filmography ==
- 2002: Fermeley
- 2012: Tigisti
- 2016: Zeyregefet Embaba
- 2010: Timali
