= Tsehaytu Beraki =

Eritrean musician (1939–2018)

- Born: 1 September 1939; Quatit, Italian East Africa (now Eritrea)
- Died: 24 May 2018 (aged 78) Rotterdam, Netherlands
- Instruments: Vocals, kebero, krar

Tsehaytu Beraki (Tigrinya: ጽሃይቱ በራኺ; 1 September 1939 – 24 May 2018) was an Eritrean musician, poet and political activist, known for her singing and playing of the krar (a five-string harp).

== Early life ==
Tsehaytu Beraki was born in 1939, in the small town of Quatit. She had thought that she was born in Eritrea's capital city Asmara, but in fact only moved there as a baby. It was not until she returned to Asmara in 1999, that the full story was told to her by her sister Rishan.

== Career ==
Beraki started playing the krar, a five-stringed harp, when she was about eight years old, eventually playing at weddings and parties. Her inspirations were Tsehaytu Ghergish, Fana Etel, and especially Tsehaytu Zennar, whose songs included Annes Ay keremneye Wala Hankas Yekunye (I need a man as soon as possible, even if he's crippled).

Beraki left school at sixteen, and played the krar as her full-time career. She wrote all of her own music and lyrics, and people would come from as far as Addis Ababa in Ethiopia to record her. From 1964 onwards, her lyrics became more political, and "people were surprised that I dared to sing them".

From March 1977, she became actively involved in the Eritrean independence struggle. She eventually had to leave, moving to Sudan and in 1988, Rotterdam, Netherlands. She returned to Asmara in 1999.

As well as krar, Beraki played kebero and bass-krar.

She created the album Selam on Terp Records in 2004.
