= Yemane Ghebremichael =

Musical artist (1949–1997)

Yemane Ghebremichael የማነ ገብረሚካኤል
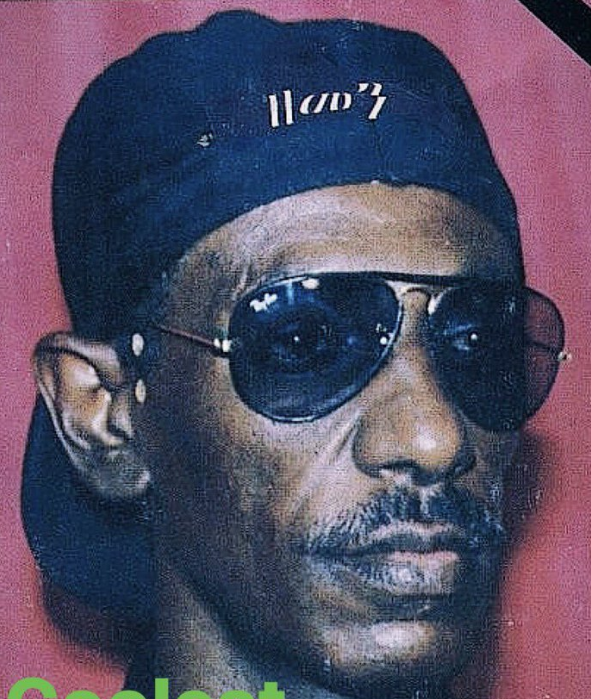

Background information
- Born: Yemane Ghebremichael; January 21, 1949; Asmara, British Military Administration in Eritrea
- Died: November 5, 1997 (aged 48) Asmara, Eritrea

Yemane Ghebremichael (January 21, 1949 – November 5, 1997), known by his stage name as Yemane Barya, was a prominent Eritrean songwriter, composer and singer. He became one of the most renowned Eritrean artists.

== Biography ==
Barya's songwriting strove to reflect what he perceived to be the Eritrean experience during the Eritrean War of Independence. His songs were dotted with stories of love, journey, hope, migration, and liberation. In 1975, he was jailed for the perceived political interpretation of one of his songs.

A few years after the declaration of the independence of Eritrea, Yemane moved to Asmara and continued to release albums that reflected the new era of hope and national prosperity, with a mixture of Eritrean melodies. He also sang about the people involved in the movement towards Eritrean independence and the sacrifices of that movement. Yemane's songs are distinct in the way that they feature a pattern with a recurring melancholic piece of melody.

Yemane was also known as the 'Eritrean caretaker'. He died on November 5, 1997 due to a sudden illness.

== Well-regarded songs and albums ==
- Hadar girki, (ሓዳር ጌርኪ)
- Deki Asmara, (ደቂ ኣስመራ)
- Wedebat Adey, (ወደባት ዓደይ)
- Asmera, (ኣስመራ)
- Zemen, (ዘመን)
- Meskerem, (መስከረም)
- Natsenet, (ናጽነት)
- Delay Selam, (ደላይ ሰላም)
- Aykonen Oromay, (ኣይኮነን ኦሮማይ)
- Wegiha'ya Meriet, (ወጊሓ'ያ መሬት)
- Mesob Ade, (መሶብ ኣደ)
- Ab Kulu Gobotat, (ኣብ ኩሉ ጎቦታት)
- Nay Meqabir Btsotey, (ናይ መቃብር ብጾተይ)
- Tezkoneley, (ተዝኾነለይ)
- Anbibeyo Debdabeki, (ኣንቢበዮ ደብዳቤኺ)
- Ab Sidet Zeleka, (ኣብ ስደት ዘለኻ)
- Kemeleki Zefkireki, (ከሜለኺ ዘፍቅረኪ)
- Yikielo Eye Ane, (ይኽእሎ እየ ኣነ)
- Gual Hagerey, (ጓል ሃገረይ)
- Bsrah Tegedide, (ብስራሕ ተገዲደ)
- Chira Feres, (ጭራ ፈረስ)
- Mealtat Newihuni, (መዓልታት ነዊሑኒ)
- Emo Ke Dea Hji Entay Ygeber, (እሞ ኸ ደኣ ሕጂ እንታይ ይገበር)
- Aydekeskun ane, (ኣይደቀስኩን ኣነ)
