= Saba Kidane =

Eritrean journalist, poet and political ativist

- Born: 1978 (age 46–47); Asmara, Ethiopia
- Occupations: poet; political activist; journalist
- Employer: youth radio
- Notable work: "Tsiruy guhaf nafiqe"

Saba Kidane (born 1978) is an Eritrean journalist, poet, and political activist.

== Early life ==
Born in Asmara, Saba Kidane dropped out of school and joined the Eritrean People's Liberation Front at the age of 13. She returned to school in 1995. She was a program director for youth radio and is a single mother.

Most of her poetry is composed in Tigrinya. Her poetry addresses children, everyday life, social issues, and the effect of war on Eritrean women. Her poem, "Tsiruy guhaf nafiqe" ("I miss the clean garbage"), encourages careful condom disposal due to the risk of spreading HIV.

Saba Kidane was denied a U.S. visitor's visa in 2001.
