= Yohannes Tikabo =

Eritrean singer-songwriter (born 1974)

Yohannes Tikabo (Tigrinya: ዮውሃንስ ትኳቦ; born 1974) is an Eritrean singer-songwriter. Once an advocate of the national government, Yohannes emigrated from Eritrea in October 2013, while on a tour in the United States sponsored by the People's Front for Democracy and Justice, Eritrea's ruling party. A song he subsequently released on YouTube, "Hadnetna" denouncing the ruling party has since gone viral.
