= Helen Meles =

Eritrean singer and actress

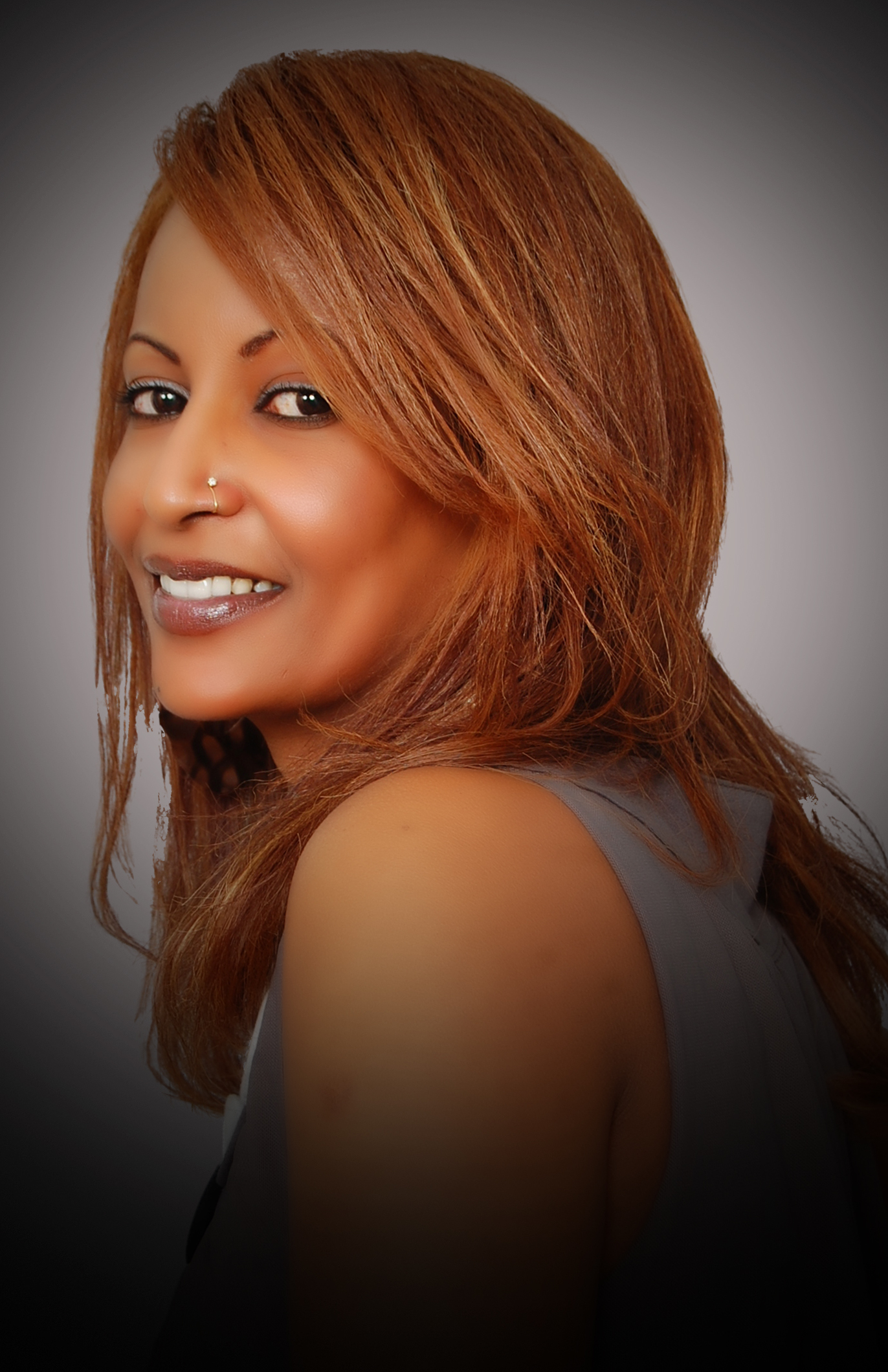

Background information
- Born: Eritrea
- Genres: Eritrean music
- Occupations: Singer, actress
- Instrument: Vocals
- Years active: 1990s–present

Helen Meles (Tigrinya: ሄለን መለስ) is an Eritrean singer and actress. She has released several albums and appeared in many top-rated Eritrean films.

== Biography ==
She began her musical career early, at the age of eight, when she joined the Kassala, Sudan-based Red Flowers band (ቀያሕቲ ዕምባባ). The group was formed by the Eritrean People's Liberation Front (EPLF)'s local education branch. With the band, she performed in different parts of Sudan as a lead singer.

At the age of 12 in 1978, Helen joined the EPLF, where she was enrolled in the organization's revolutionary school. She is known for her successful transition from ex-war combatant with the group to prominent singer.

== Discography ==
=== Albums ===
- Vol. 1 – Kuhulay Segen – 1997
- Vol. 2 – Ti Gezana – 1998 (Remix of Tebereh Tesfahuney Oldies)
- Mamina (Remix of Amleset Abay Oldies) feat. Amleset Abay
- Vol. 3 – Remix of Kuhulay Segen – 2000
- Vol. 4 – Res'ani – 2003
- Vol. 5 – Halewat – 2006
- Vol. 6 – Baal Sham – 2013

=== Singles ===
- "Abey keydu silimatki" (1990)
- "Eza adey" (1998)
- "Warsay" (1998)
- "Shabai" (a.k.a. "Aba Selie") (1999)
- "Debdabieu" (1999)
- "Mesilka we" (2000)
- "Sham" (2000)
- "Betey" (2001)
- "Gagyeka" (2002)
- "Nacfa" (2003)
- "Nibat fikri" (2003)
- "Likie" (2003)
- "Nisa tinber" (2003)
- "Kewhi lubu" (2004)
- "Manta Fikri" (2004)
- "Ertrawit ade" (2004)
- "Halime Ember" (2005)
- "Fir Fir" (2006)
- "Nihnan nisikin" (2006)
- "Abaka Ember" (2006)
- "Tsetser" (2008)
- "Menesey" (2010)
- "Rahsi" (2011)
- "Dibab" (2012)
- "Fikri Hamime" (2013)
- "Seare" (2014)
- "Tsigabey" (2016)
- "Adi Sewra" (2017)
- "Tezareb" (2017)
- "Yiakleni" (2018)
- "Meaza" (2019)
- "Kemey Ele" (2021)
- "Kemey Dina" (2022)
- "Metkelu Zexnee" (2024) - Helen Meles with Kaleab Teweldemedhin.

== Filmography ==
- Fikrin Kunatn (1997)
- Debdabieu (1999)
- Mesilka'we (2000)
- Rahel (2002)
- Manta Fikri (2004)
- Tuwyo Netsela (2006)
- Menyu Tehatati (2007)
- Hlna (2025)

== Awards ==
- 2000: 3rd AbaSelie (Shabay) EriTv Award National Songs
- 2001: 4th Sham Raimoc Eritrean Artistic Award
- 2001: 1st Sham EriTv Award Top Ten Love Songs
- 2003: 3rd Res’Ani, 4th Nib’At Fikri, 7th NisiHa Fikri Top Ten Eri-Festival Artistic Award
- 2005: 1st Halime EmberTop Ten Eri-Festival Artistic Award
- 2006: 2nd Fir Fir Top Ten Eri-Festival Artistic Award
- 2007: 7th Beleni’ta Top Ten Eri-Festival Artistic Award

== See also ==
- Music of Eritrea
