= Yegizaw Michael =

- Known for: Public art in Seattle; Artists Against AIDS campaign in Eritrea (1997)
- Notable work: Point of Connection mural, Marymoor Village station (2024); Mosaics for Seattle Children's Museum and Yesler Terrace project
- Style: Visual art Public art Mural; Mosaic
- Awards: Best Artist of the Year, Kenya (1995) * Raimok National Art Award, Eritrea (1996, 1997)

Yegizaw Michael, also known as Yeggy, is an Eritrean artist based in the United States. He has exhibited his work in Kenya, Uganda, Austria, Eritrea, and the United States.

== Early life ==
Michael was raised in Addis Ababa, Ethiopia. He later fled to Kenya due to fear of persecution.

== Career ==
Michael has exhibited his work internationally in Kenya, Uganda, Austria, Eritrea, and the United States.

In 1997, he initiated, organized, and served as artistic director of the historic Artists Against AIDS national awareness campaign in Eritrea. The campaign involved over 30 Eritrean artists, musicians, and poets collaborating in a nationwide effort to educate and raise awareness about AIDS.

Since settling in the United States, Michael has been based in Seattle, where he has created several public art works, including mosaics for the Seattle Children's Museum and the Seattle Housing Authority's Yesler Terrace project. In 2024, his mural "Point of Connection" was installed by Sound Transit at Marymoor Village station in Redmond, Washington.

== Awards ==
- Best Artist of the Year, Kenya (1995)
- Raimok National Art Award, Eritrea (1996 and 1997)
