= Aron Mehzion =

Eritrean-German artist (born 1970)

Aron Mehzion (born 1970 in Asmara, Eritrea) is an Eritrean-born German visual artist, including sculptor. He has German citizenship and lives in Düsseldorf.

== Life and works ==
Mehzion left his hometown at the age of five, after his father, Amahazion Tekeste – a businessman – was murdered by the Derg regime in 1975. Together with his mother, Gabriella Woldu – a skilled model maker – his brother, Amanuel, and two sisters, Eden and Saba, he fled to Germany through Sudan, Egypt and Italy. After graduating from the Geschwister-Scholl-Gymnasium in Düsseldorf, he studied at the Kunstakademie Düsseldorf from 1993 to 2000. He was a pupil of Michael Buthe, Jannis Kounellis and Gerhard Merz.

Since he could not live on art alone, in 2002 he opened his first bar, called "Baron", in the "Barockschlösschen" in the Ehrenhof in Düsseldorf (Haus Ehrenhof 3). He inaugurated the bar with the exhibition entitled "hellgruen" (light green), making it a "living space for artists".

When the bar premises were rented to the E.ON group for concerts, Ulrike Groos, the then-director of the Kunsthalle Düsseldorf, and Rita Kersting, the then-director of the Kunstverein für die Rhinelande und Westphalen (Artists' Society for the Rhinelands and Westphalia) offered him an alternative room in the Kunsthalle Düsseldorf. With the collaboration of the students of the academy, Stefano Brivio and Detlef Weinrich, and of the artist friend Andreas Gursky who donated black armchairs as furniture, in 2004 he founded the lounge Salon des Amateurs.

The bar has developed, also through the Approximation Festival started together with Volker Bertelmann in 2005, into a well-known night club for live acts of electronic music and new improvisation.

As a visual artist, Mehzion deals "with physical and mathematical questions of mirror symmetry, taking into account considerations on four-dimensional spaces". He is particularly interested in the temporal dimension of objects, which he pursues with impressions and impressions on tabletop installations.

== Selected exhibitions ==
- 2010: Aron Mehzion, Showroom Tina Miyake, Düsseldorf
- 2016: Schaf und Ruder/Wool and Water, Gemeinschaftsausstellung in der Kunsthalle Düsseldorf, Lili Dujourie, Isa Genzken, Astrid Klein, Mischa Kuball, Reinhard Mucha, Gerhard Richter, Elaine Sturtevant and Rosemarie Trockel
- 2016: Inverresion, Galerie Marzona, Berlin
- 2018: Parallélisme Élémentaire, Galerie Marzona, Berlin, Germany
- 2018: Four Rooms with a View, Galerija Vartai, Vilnius, Lithuania

== Bibliography ==
- Gregor Jansen (Hrsg.): Schaf und Ruder (Wool and Water). Distanz, Berlin 2016, ISBN 978-3-95476-179-1, S. 123.
