= Margaret Torn =

Biogeochemist

Margaret Susan Torn
- Education: University of California, Berkeley
- Scientific career
- Workplaces: Lawrence Berkeley National Laboratory
- Thesis: Environmental controls over methane flux from ecosystems and the potential for feedbacks with climatic change (1994)

Margaret Torn is an ecologist at Lawrence Berkeley National Laboratory known for her research on carbon cycling, especially with respect to the interactions between soils and the atmosphere.

== Education and career ==
Torn grew up in Marin county and worked in the family's food business, the Torn Ranch, where they handled nuts and dried fruits. She started college at the College of Marin before transferring to University of California, Berkeley. She earned a B.S. (1984), an M.S. (1990), and a Ph.D. (1994) from the University of California, Berkeley. From 1994 until 1998, Torn was a postdoctoral fellow at University of California Irvine and Stanford University. In 1998, she joined the Earth Sciences Division at Lawrence Berkeley National Laboratory, and was promoted to senior scientist in 2013. Beginning in 2018, she is also an adjunct professor at the University of California, Berkeley. In 2015 she received an honorary doctorate from the University of Zurich.

In 2017, Torn was named a fellow of the American Geophysical Union who cited her as follows:

For fundamental contributions to understanding soil carbon stabilization and sustained leadership in quantifying feedbacks between the carbon cycle and climate

== Research ==
Torn's research combines observational data and experimental manipulations to examine the impact of changing climate conditions on the carbon cycle, with a focus on the interactions between soils and atmosphere. Torn has experimentally warmed soils and then measured the impact of changing conditions on gas fluxes from the soils. She works on the factors controlling the release of greenhouse gases from the tundra in the north slope of Alaska, how climate change impacts the severity of forest fires, the carbon sequestered in fungi found in soils, and the decomposition of black carbon using archived soil samples from Russia. One theme in her research is assessing the factors that govern the persistence of organic carbon in soil.

=== Selected publications ===
- Hicks Pries, Caitlin E.; Castanha, C.; Porras, R. C.; Torn, M. S. (2017-03-31). "The whole-soil carbon flux in response to warming". Science. 355 (6332): 1420–1423. Bibcode:2017Sci...355.1420H. doi:10.1126/science.aal1319. ISSN 0036-8075. OSTI 1437081. PMID 28280251. S2CID 206654333.
- Torn, Margaret S.; Trumbore, Susan E.; Chadwick, Oliver A.; Vitousek, Peter M.; Hendricks, David M. (September 1997). "Mineral control of soil organic carbon storage and turnover". Nature. 389 (6647): 170–173. Bibcode:1997Natur.389..170T. doi:10.1038/38260. ISSN 1476-4687. S2CID 4408395.
- Schmidt, Michael W. I.; Torn, Margaret S.; Abiven, Samuel; Dittmar, Thorsten; Guggenberger, Georg; Janssens, Ivan A.; Kleber, Markus; Kögel-Knabner, Ingrid; Lehmann, Johannes; Manning, David A. C.; Nannipieri, Paolo; Rasse, Daniel P.; Weiner, Steve; Trumbore, Susan E. (October 2011). "Persistence of soil organic matter as an ecosystem property". Nature. 478 (7367): 49–56. Bibcode:2011Natur.478...49S. doi:10.1038/nature10386. ISSN 1476-4687. OSTI 1051632. PMID 21979045. S2CID 3461265.

== Awards and honors ==
- Presidential Early Career Award for Scientists and Engineers (2003)
- Fellow, American Geophysical Union (2017)
- Berkeley Lab Director's award for exception achievement in science (2017)
- National Academy of Sciences, Engineering, and Medicine (Engineering, 2025)
