= Sierra Nevada Research Institute =

Research institute

The Sierra Nevada Research Institute (SNRI) is a research institute based at the University of California, Merced. Established in 2007, it was UC Merced's first research institute. SNRI conducts interdisciplinary research in the Sierra Nevada and the San Joaquin Valley, focusing on issues including climate change, water resources, and the effects of wildfires. The institute is currently headed by the nationally recognized soil scientist Asmeret Asefaw Berhe, who took over as director in July 2025.

== Field stations ==
=== Yosemite Field Station ===
Established in 2006 in partnership with Yosemite National Park, the Yosemite Field Station is located in the historic village of Wawona in southern Yosemite National Park.

=== Sequoia Field Station ===
UC Merced also operates a field station in Sequoia and Kings Canyon National Parks, established in 2006 with the National Park Service and United States Geological Survey.
