= History of Asmara =

UNESCO World Heritage Site
- Location: Asmara
- Part of: Eritrea

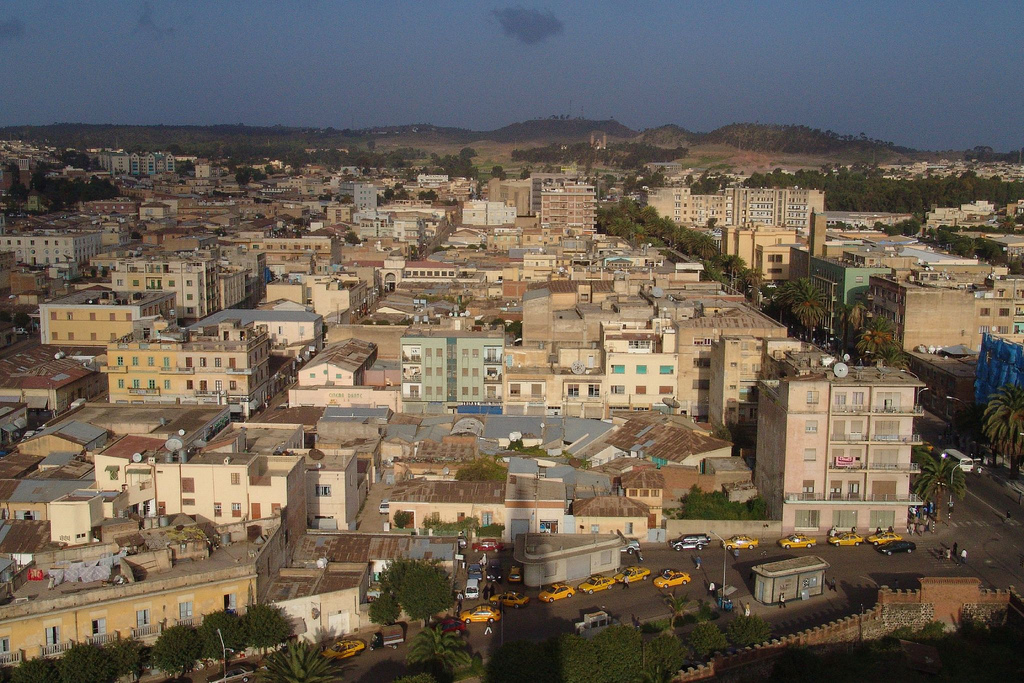
Asmara (2005)

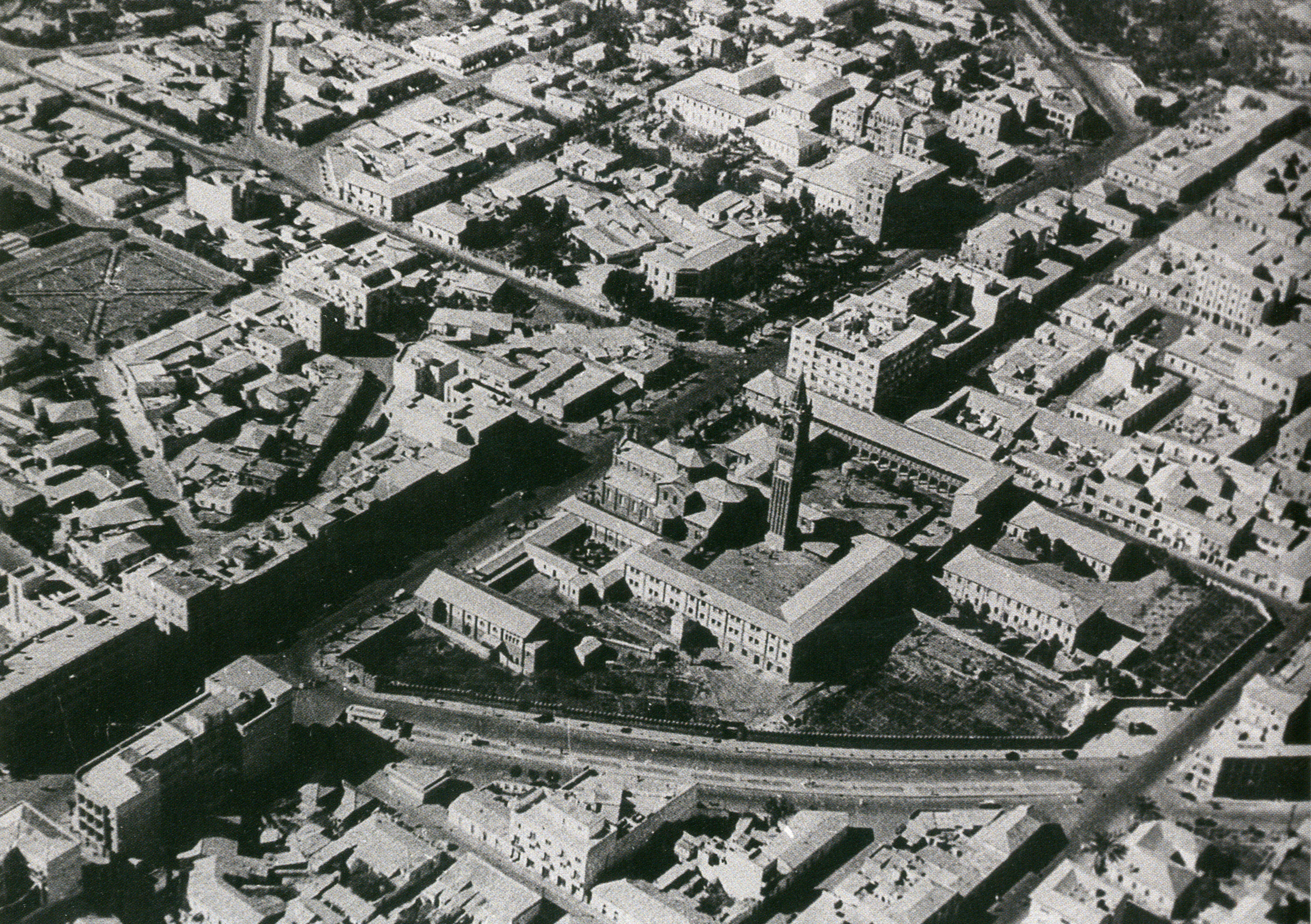
Asmara in the 1940s

Asmara, the capital of Eritrea, first rose to prominence in medieval and post-medieval times. Though it had been long overshadowed by nearby Debarwa, the residence of the Bahr Negash or the governor of the coastal province, it still existed as a major settlement for over half a millennium and enjoyed some importance as it stood on the trade route to Massawa. During the 20th century it was a staging ground for Italian initiatives in East Africa, collateral of Britain's colonial politics, and the subject of the expansion of Ethiopia until 1993, when the sovereign state of Eritrea was established. Despite the passage of over seventy years, the city (apart from a large group of buildings of avant-garde design) has remained mostly unchanged in structural design, likely influenced by its position as a UNESCO World Heritage Site.

Asmara — developed similarly to a European city — is today, an Eritrean city. Although the city's planners, architects, and engineers were largely European, members of the indigenous population were used as construction workers. People who live in Asmara still strongly identify with their city's legacy.

== Etymology ==
The name Asmara derives from "Arbate Asmara", the name given to a village on the site of today's Asmara. The name means "the women have united the four villages" and relates to a foundational story in which women forced the men of four villages to consolidate their villages into one.

== Pre-colonial to 1922 ==
=== Pre-colonial Asmara ===
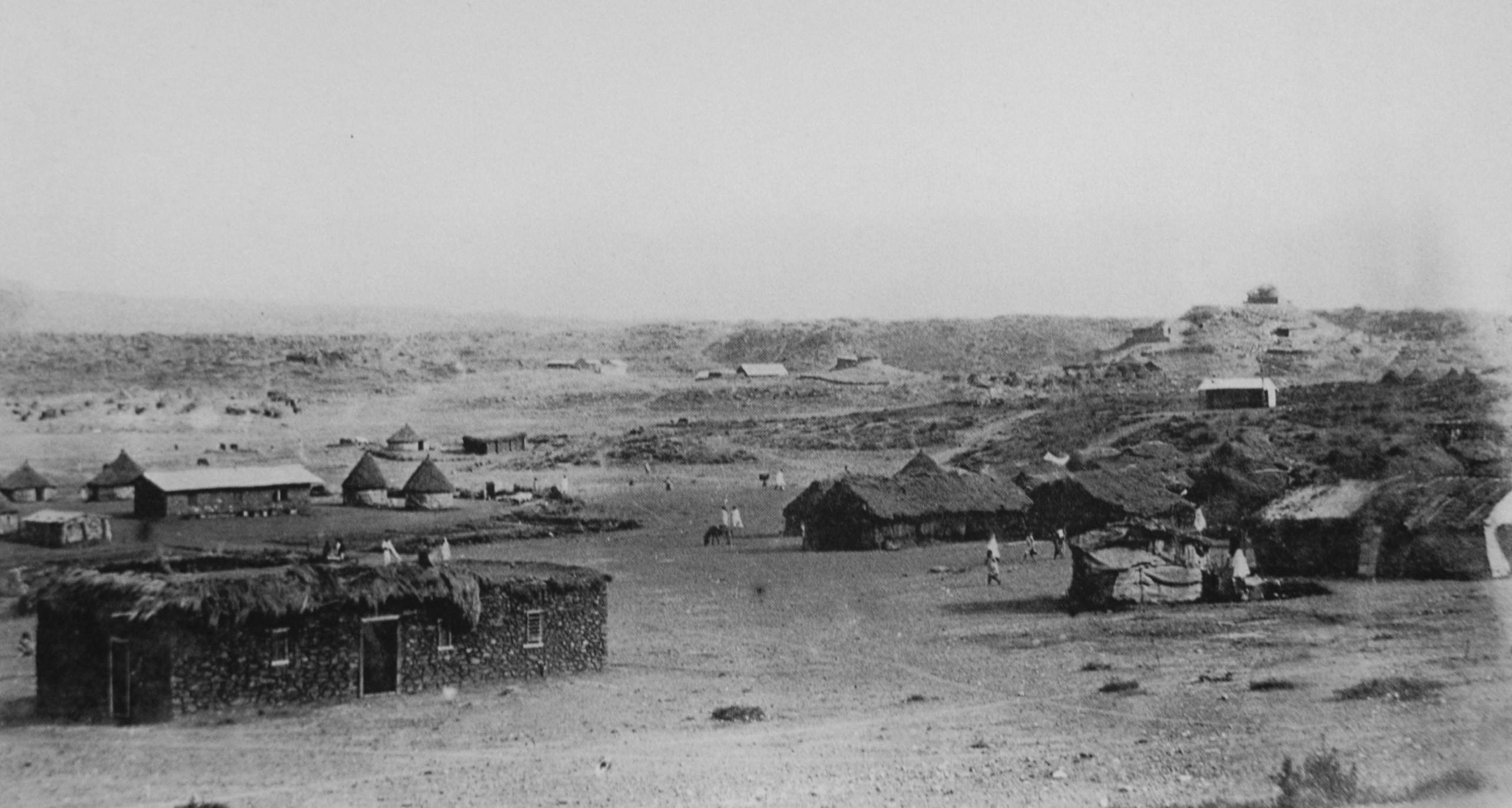
Asmara village in the 1890s

The area around present-day Asmara was an ideal place to build a settlement, due to its fertile soil, mild climate because of its location on a plateau, and high rainfall for the region. Remains of prehistoric peoples have been found near Asmara. From the nearby rule of the ancient Aksum Empire; to Islam's spread into the Horn of Africa from the region; to ruins of small villages found around present-day Asmara.

According to oral traditions, there were once four villages on the Asmara plains. Attacks by wild animals and raids by other indigenous groups prompted the women of the neighboring villages to come together to discuss solutions that would help to ensure the protection of their families, properties, and belongings. The women decided that they would not serve lunch to the men of their villages until they agreed to consolidate the four villages into one. The men fulfilled the women's wishes and built one united village, which they named Arbate Asmara.

Asmara was first mentioned in a Latin itinerary during the reign of Emperor Dawit I (1382–1411). A century later an Ethiopian monk, Brother Zogi, spoke of Asmara in 1519, describing it as a "great city".

The missionary Remedius Prutky passed through Asmara in 1751, and described in his memoirs that a church built there by Jesuit priests 130 years ago was still intact.

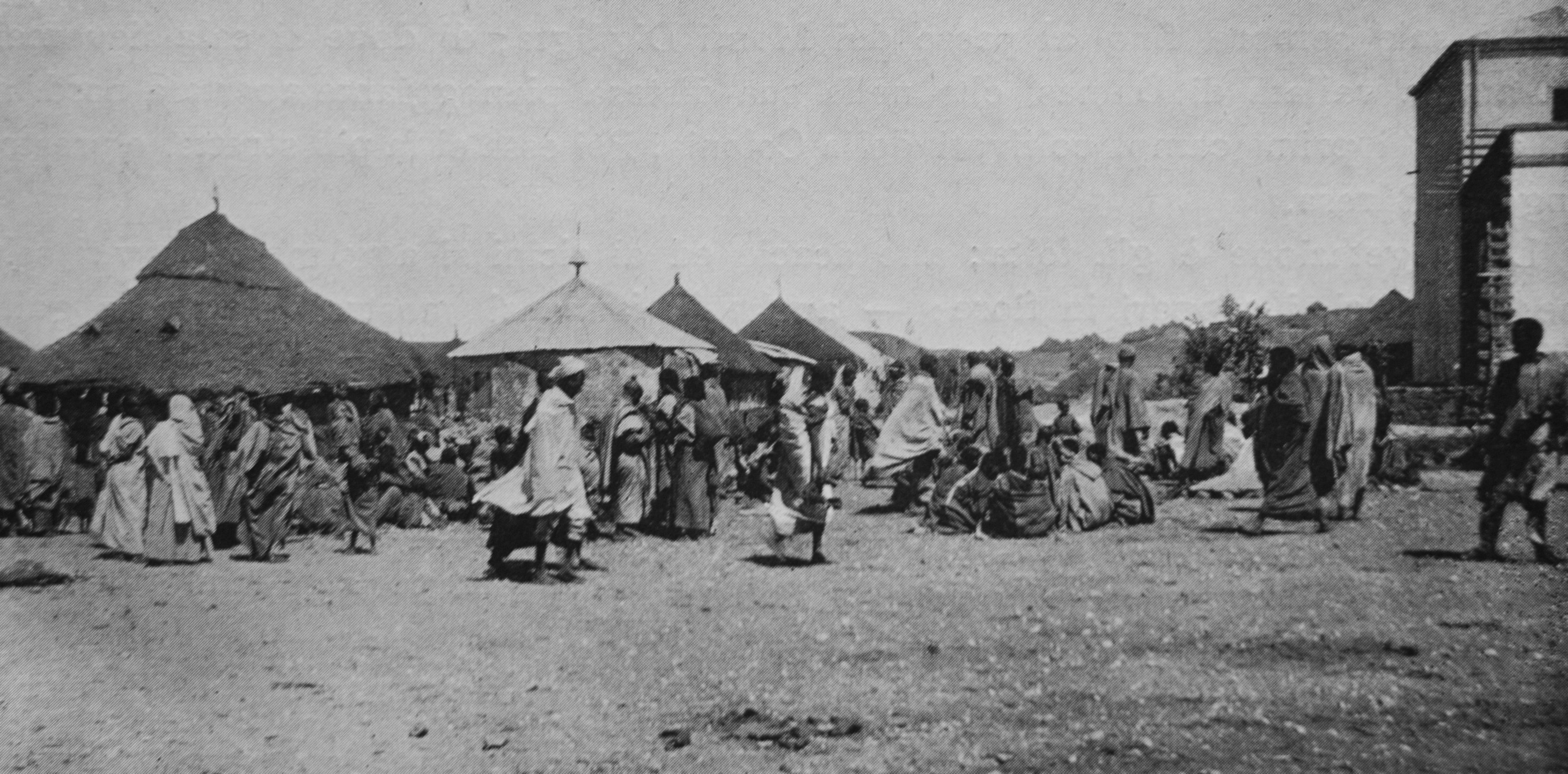
Asmara's market in the 1890s

During the middle of the 19th century, Asmara was a small village of just 150 inhabitants. Because of its proximity to the coast, Asmara suffered in the early 1870s from the incursions of the Egyptians. E. A. De Cosson found Asmara in 1873, "almost deserted" as "being so near the frontier, they had been exposed to the ravages of the Egyptian soldiers." The Ethiopian Emperor Yohannes IV, concerned by the Egyptian raids in the area, appointed his British advisor John Kirkham to govern the area in 1875. The following year, Asmara was sacked by the pro-Egyptian warlord Woldemichael Solomon, who raided the area until the Egyptian defeat at Gura.

After the decline of Egyptian influence in the region, Yohannes appointed Ras Alula to be governor of the region in 1877. Alula declared Asmara the capital of the province, and within just a few years had increased the population of the small village to more than 5,000 inhabitants. A buoyant weekly market drew traders and builders from all over the surrounding region. Political and military conflicts between the local warlords of the Hamasien plateau compelled Alula to station 12,000 soldiers in Asmara, so that the small city soon took on the appearance of a military camp. During the 1870s, there were at least two battles between Alula and these warlords, both of which essentially destroyed the city. Asmara's weekly market, however, continued to take place. Emperor Yohannes IV called Alula and his troops to support him in his fight against the Mahdists.

=== Italian occupation ===
Italian troops took advantage of Alula's absence, the power vacuum left as a result of Emperor Yohannes’ death, and the havoc wreaked by three years of famine to take control of the city on August 3, 1889. They built their fort on a hill in the village of Beit Mekae, forcing the inhabitants of this village to resettle nearby. At the time of General Baldisera’s arrival, the small town had 3000 inhabitants and consisted of traditional mud huts, Agdos and Hidmos. Above all, the military fort at Beit Mekae was a strategic point when it came to controlling the local population; it also served as a military strongpoint from which local uprisings, which were largely directed against the government’s power of eminent domain, could be suppressed. Eritrea officially became an Italian colony in 1890 and Massawa – already the seat of the colonial administration since 1885 – was declared the capital. At this time, because of the danger of insurrection in the highlands, Asmara was not considered to become the capital of the new colony. Furthermore, Bizzon explains, Asmara was not developed enough to serve as the capital: "Politically, militarily, and even logistically, the distance between Massawa and Asmara is greater than the distance between Italy and Massawa." The lack of an infrastructural link to Massawa prevented Asmara from developing quickly.

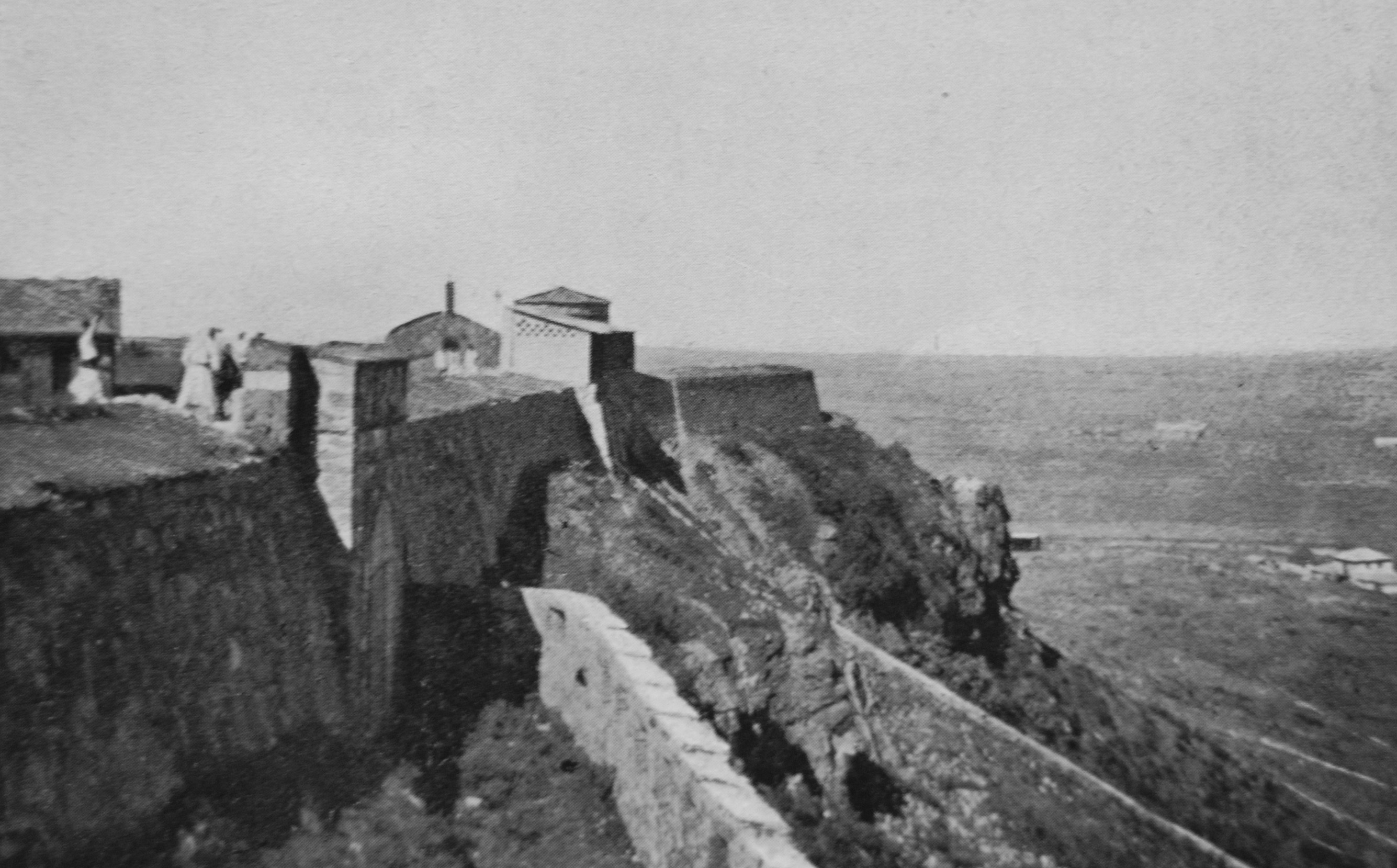
Fort Baldisera (Asmara) overlooking the Hamasien plateau

Despite this, Asmara rose to significance in accordance with the Italian plan for colonization. The interest in the occupation of Eritrea lay, on the one hand, in the settlement of Italian citizens, and on the other, in Eritrea as a military base from which expansion could take place. The Ethiopian Empire was one of the last uncolonized regions of Africa, and the vision of a strong, modern Italian nation after the successes of the Risorgimento, would require the acquisition of colonies if the country was to become a European superpower, and to affirm the autonomy of the young kingdom. Colonial politics brought about the government's claim to eminent domain as well as the realization of many noteworthy infrastructure projects. As a result of the takeover of Asmara by foreign militaries, and because of the employment opportunities in infrastructure projects throughout Eritrea, the population of Asmara itself shrunk from 1500 to 800 inhabitants during the first five years of the Italian occupation, ( but since then has always increased, especially when the Italian Eritrean capital was moved there from Massawa. However, it remained an important market town on the Hamasien Plateau. The construction of the Massawa-Asmara-Railroad as well as a funicular railroad built along the same stretch that could transport heavy loads, allowed the Italians to use Asmara as a new base in the highlands.

=== Declared as a capital ===
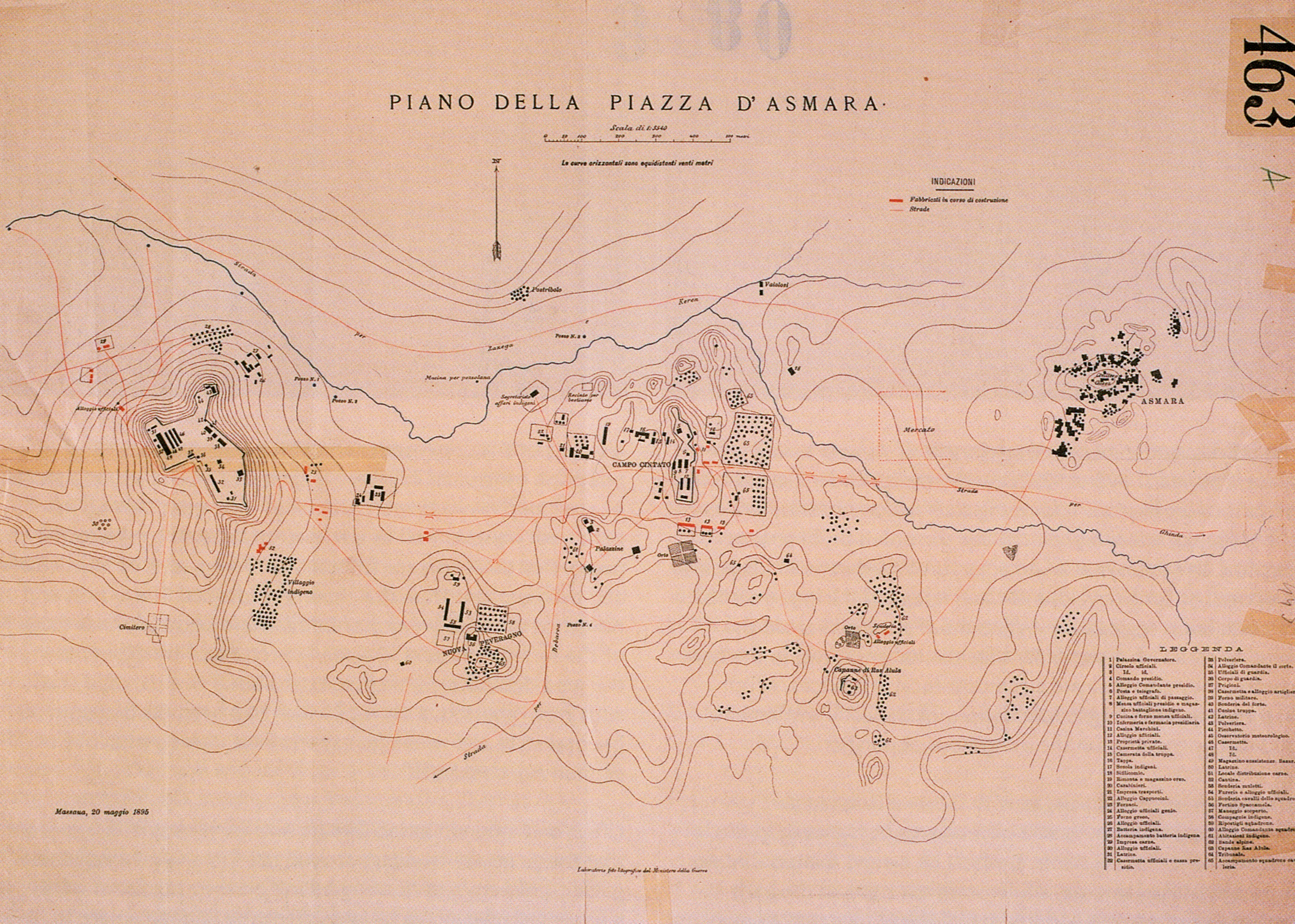
Map of Asmara in 1895

With the arrival in 1897, of the first governor, Ferdinando Martini, and after advances in the invasion of the highlands, Asmara was declared the capital of the colony of Eritrea. Asmara offered a strategic military position in the highlands opposite Massawa, fortifications at the residences of Alula and Baldissera, and an increase in the quality and quantity of transportation connections in the region. The possibility that the city could become a cultural-historical hub did not play any role in the decision to make Asmara into the capital. Only a few modern buildings like the Commissariato, a small jail, the troop commanders' villa, a club for Italian officers, and several houses and roads were built before 1900.

These buildings surrounded the old post office building in the city neighborhood known as Mai Bela, remembered for its narrow streets and short blocks, and were symbols of the beginnings of modern Asmara. In 1900, a fire destroyed large parts of neighborhoods inhabited mostly by indigenous people, which would have given colonial city planners the chance to reorganize these areas in accordance with European criteria had they taken the opportunity. Early urban development as well as the construction of two fortresses in addition to Fort Baldisera took place along the East-West line, which later became the city's central avenue, today called Harnet Avenue.

=== City plan ===
The first city plan for Asmara was introduced under Martini in 1902. At the center of the plan was a grid system, even though the topography of the city was not ideal for such a road system, as the following report describes:

I say the 'flat ground' of the city, but instead it is anything else but flat. Light undulations, little hills, mounds, bumps, dips and little valleys in the ground bring a truly picturesque variety to the buildings and to the streets, which therefore never appear similar to one another. They offer suitable areas and remarkable positions in which to make public buildings prominent. In short, it is a ground so made that it would be the torment of a builder from Turin, the horror of an engineer from America, but would be dreamt of by an architect who is truly artistic, a lover of the picturesque, and an enemy of uniformity."

Nevertheless, Italian planners chose to implement a grid system for Asmara's roads. It would be a symbol of how the "civilized" brought order to the organically developed neighborhoods of the natives, and would, in this way, highlight the so-called superiority of the colonizers.

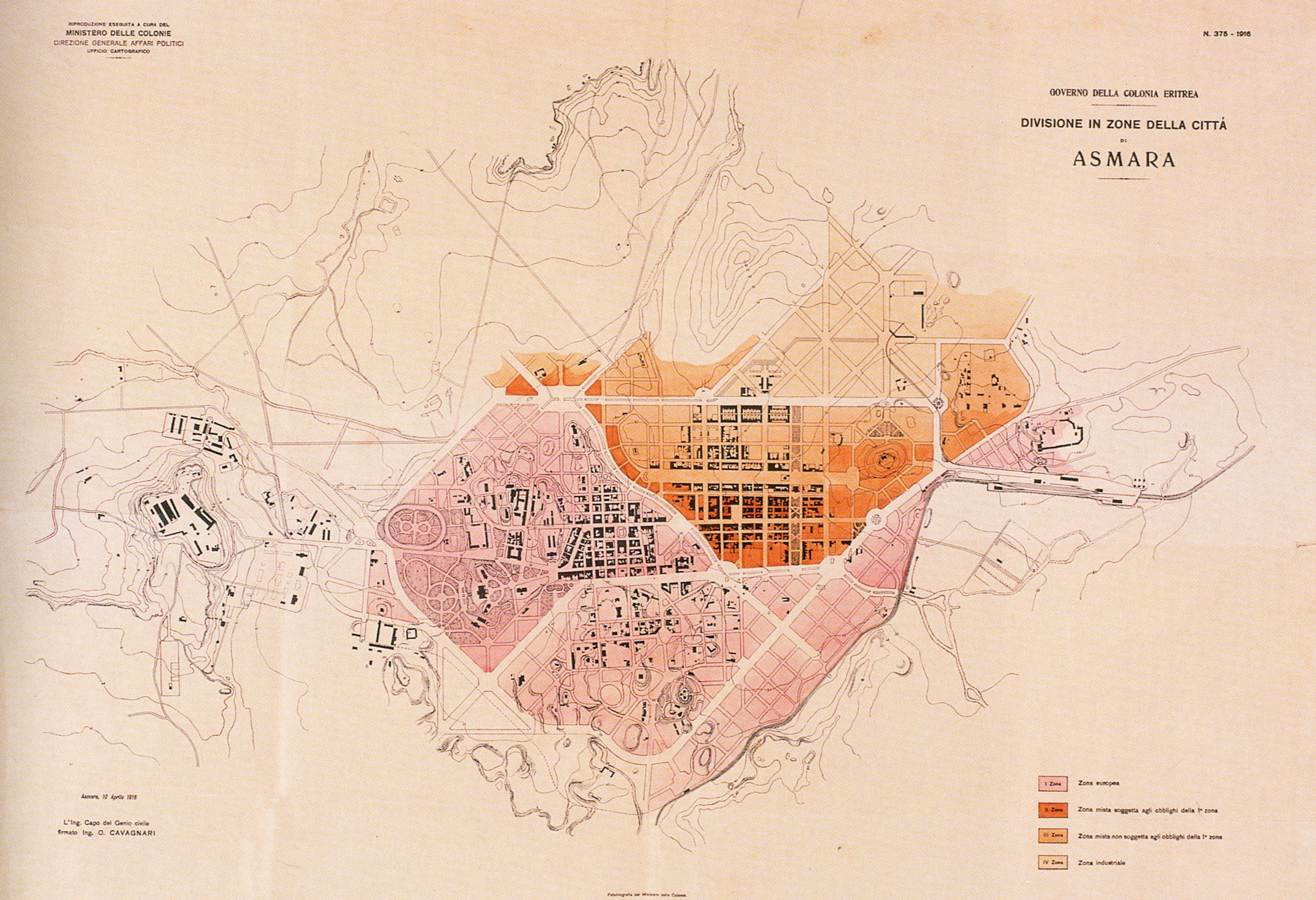
Urban Plan for Asmara in 1913

The first city plans should be seen as an expression of the power relations between two groups. The plan from 1902 had already divided the city into three zones: a zone for Italians which included the city center, a zone centered on the traditional market meant for other European groups like Greeks and Jews, and an unplanned zone for indigenous folks, located outside of the northern city border. A fourth zone for industry was envisaged in the next plan of 1908. Additional plans by planner Cavagniari, which were decided upon in 1913 and 1916 respectively, strengthened the principle of racial separation, which then became increasingly more rigid during the beginning of the fascist era in the 1920s.

The plans saw Asmara first and foremost as a new home for qualified skilled laborers from Italy. The spatial model of the garden city would be applied to the new European quarter, and would include broad, tree-lined boulevards, residential streets, and houses situated behind bougainvillea hedges, built so that they did not crowd one another. Similarly, Asmara became an Italian city, prompting Eritrean journalist Emanuel Sahle to say: "Now Eritrean mothers who travel to Rome to see their relatives there wonder at how the citizens of Rome dared imitate 'our dear and beautiful Asmera [sic]'." The fact that Eritreans could express appropriation and affection in this way may now sound astonishing, as Asmara was not only predominantly Italian, but Eritreans themselves could only make limited use of the capital.

The institutionalized "nationalistic" separation central to Italian colonial politics was not designed to account for the indigenous population, who would be displaced as the expansion of the industrial zone reached the unplanned quarters to the north. Eritreans who owned property in the city center, or the European quarter, were forced to move out and sell their land. In 1908, the governor issued a decree that, in the interest of promoting and maintaining "public order", declared that the first zone was meant only for Italians and citizens from other European countries, whereas the sudditi coloniali, or the "colonial subjects", were only allowed in the indigenous quarter and the mixed Market zone. Only the Askari, indigenous soldiers who served in colonial troops, were allowed to build their huts in areas near the Italian residences, where conditions were better than those endured by their compatriots. The untypical proximity of the Askari to the Italians illustrates the deep trust of the Italian administration in the indigenous troops. In 1926, colonial minister, Luigi Federzoni, described the Eritrean regiments as "the most solid, effective and safe pillar of our military might in all our African colonies." This relationship lasted throughout the Italian occupation of Eritrea, and is more than likely an important factor in determining the good-naturedness of Eritreans toward Italians today.

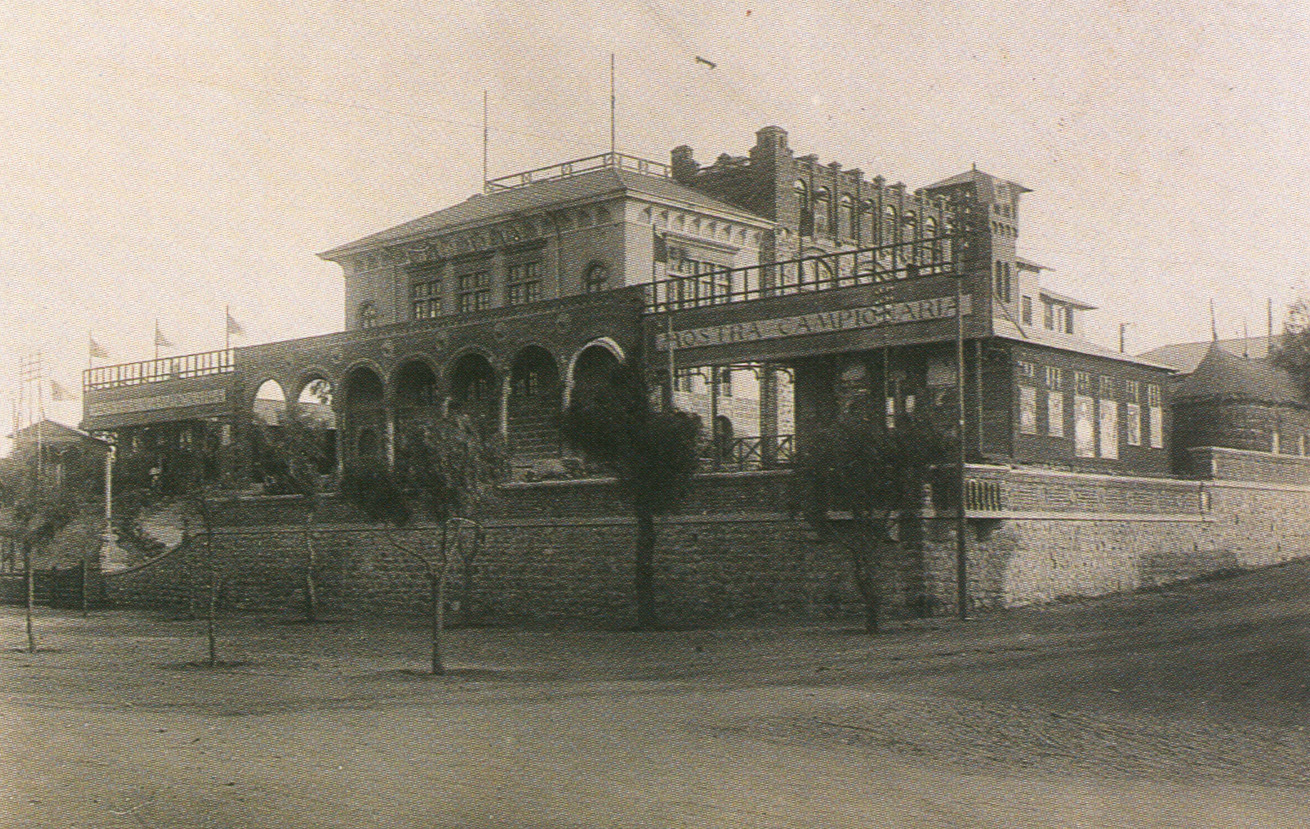
Asmara Theatre in the 1920s

The first plans led to a phase of intensive building, which ultimately resulted in an increase of Asmara’s population from between 800 and 1,900 people to more than 8,500 people in 1905, of whom around 1,500 were Europeans. This dramatic population increase exacerbated both a growth in trade and a rise in employment opportunities, as well as an upsurge in the number of native people moving from rural areas to cities.

After only a few years, in 1910, the city's population had grown to around 37,000 people. During this period of growth, many important buildings cropped up, including the Palazzo del Governatore (today the residence of the president), the first Italian school, the cathedral, the theater, and the high court, all of which are located on the centralized Corso del Re, later known as the Viale Mussolini, and even later as Harnet Avenue. Asmara's road system and the important connections between Asmara and the cities of Keren and Decamhare were also built during this time period, along with the Massawa-Asmara-Railroad Line, which was finally finished in 1911.

== Asmara under Mussolini (1922–1941) ==
=== Development under Mussolini's fascism ===
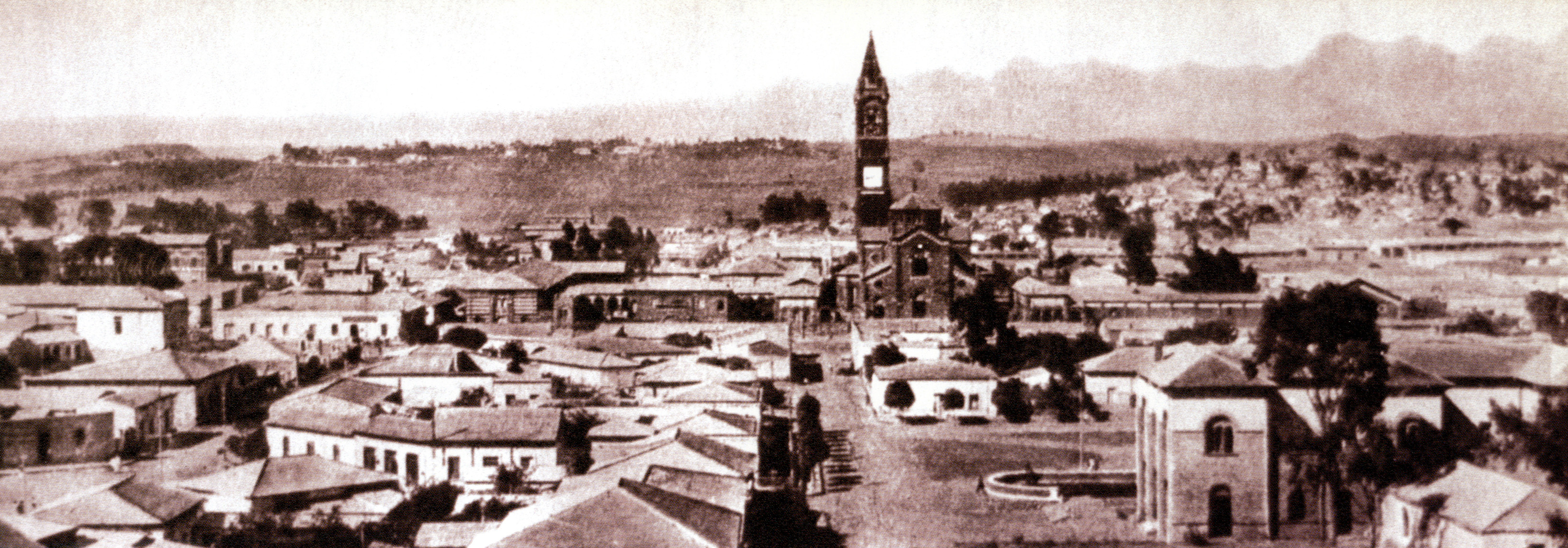
Asmara in 1928

With Mussolini's rise to power in 1922, Asmara began a new chapter in its history. During the fascist occupation, the construction that took place in the city was by far the most formative. With Mussolini's efforts put toward building an Italian empire, the Eritrean capital became increasingly important in the years that followed, and in the 1930s, it became one of the most important sites in Italian East Africa.

The construction boom, whose mark on Asmara is evident even today, did not begin immediately upon Mussolini's rise to power in 1922. Asmara was initially little more than some military installations and a colonial settlement. It grew into a small town by the 1920s. Despite the strategic location of Asmara, at first, the capital was really only used as an administrative headquarters for the Italian colonial regime. Contrary to the statement that Asmara had already grown to the size of a small city 30 years before, Bodenschatz claims that Asmara was only the size of a small village until the Ethiopian invasion in 1935. According to Bodenschatz, in the 1920s, Asmara had around 18,000 inhabitants, of whom 3,000 were Italians. The focus on city development centered on the erection of administrative buildings and housing for the political and military elite.

Modern architecture, equally lauded by architecture aficionados and city historians, slowly found its way to Eritrea in the 1920s. At this time in Italy, architecture was relatively uninfluenced by European avant-garde modernism which had taken hold in Holland, Germany, and France in particular. It wasn't until 1927 that Gruppo 7, a coalition of young architects from Milan, developed the Italian variation of avant-garde modern architecture called Rationalismo. Until 1935, the majority of structures in Asmara were built in traditional styles from established architecture schools like Novecento and the Scuola Romana, both of which appropriated certain formal elements from the Italian Gothic, the Renaissance, the Baroque, the Romantic, and the Classical periods. The architecture remained largely traditional and was based mostly on Italian models. In Asmara's most representative buildings built before 1935, this historicism is especially apparent. Asmara's theater exhibits stylistic elements from both the Romantic and Renaissance periods. The Bank of Eritrea's building is built in the Neo-Gothic style, and the Governor's Palace, as well as the post office building, were constructed using neoclassical elements. To position Mussolini's rule within the time period when modern architecture found its way to the Eritrean highland is, at least for the first half of his reign, incorrect. In reality, nearly all of the avant-garde structures were built between 1935 and 1941. Even if the building boom did not begin until the middle of the 1930s, Mussolini's fascist ideology would have already influenced the urban development plans during the 1920s and the beginning of the 1930s.

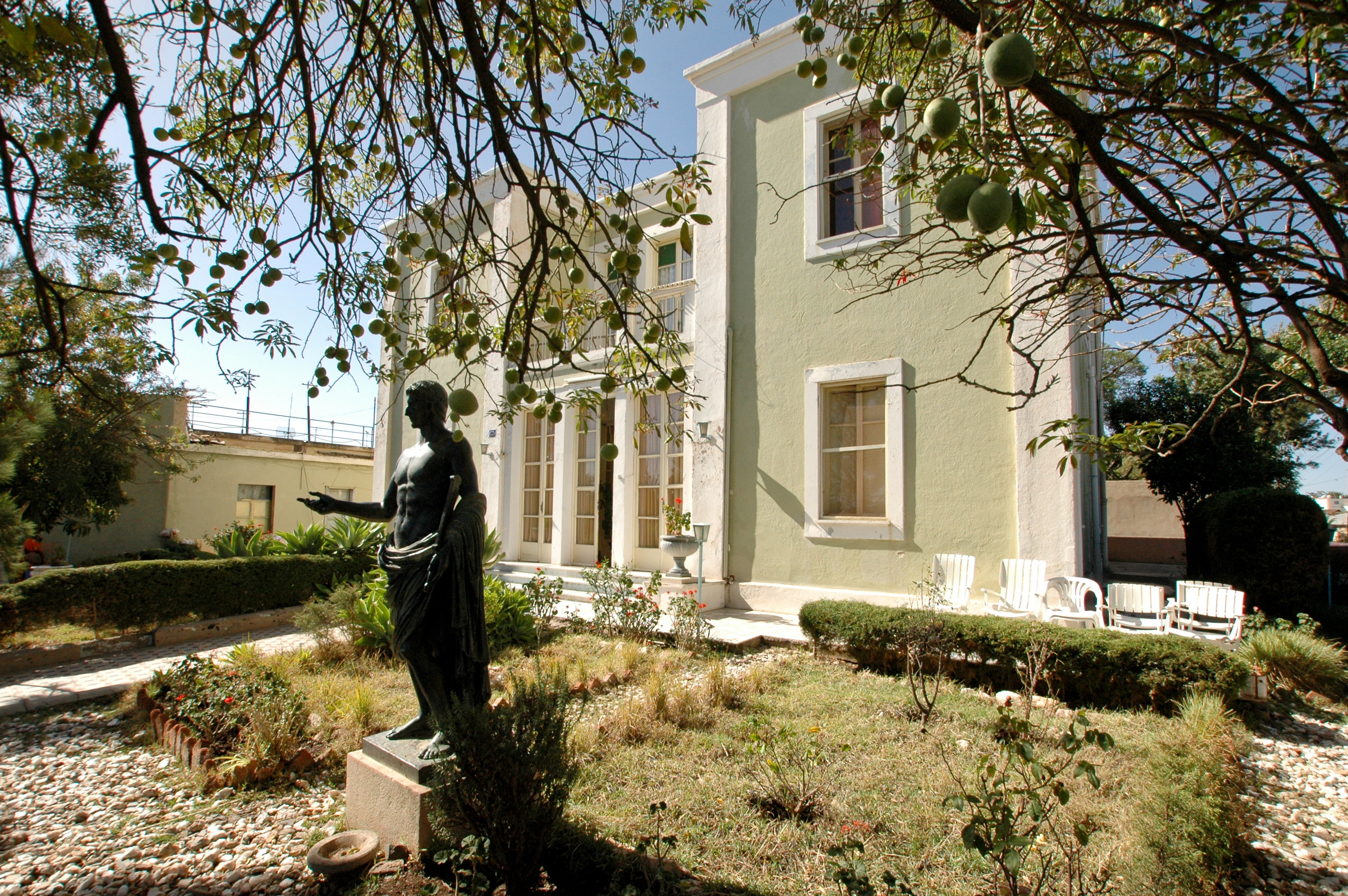
Former Mayor's Villa in Asmara. Today, it is a Bed & Breakfast.

At the beginning of the 20th century, the citizens of Asmara were separated by race. Neighborhoods for indigenous and European populations were clearly delineated from each other; however, a public area could be used by everyone. The preliminary plans to separate people from different ethnic groups were expanded and concretized under Mussolini. The improved plans from 1930 laid out how the city would be divided into four clear and separate zones: the residential quarter for the indigenous population in the north, where there were already high population densities and erratic structures; the diagonal blocks of the industry zone; the "Villa quarter" for the Europeans, located south of present-day Harnet Avenue; and, the mixed zone around the market. Located in the market zone were administrative and commercial entities that were of equal significance for both groups of people (i.e. the indigenous and the European). Additionally, this zone housed centralized cultural institutions and was interspersed with additional housing. The categorization of inhabitants by race reached its peak under fascism, with strict separation of the indigenous from the occupiers.

=== Growth as an Italian military base ===
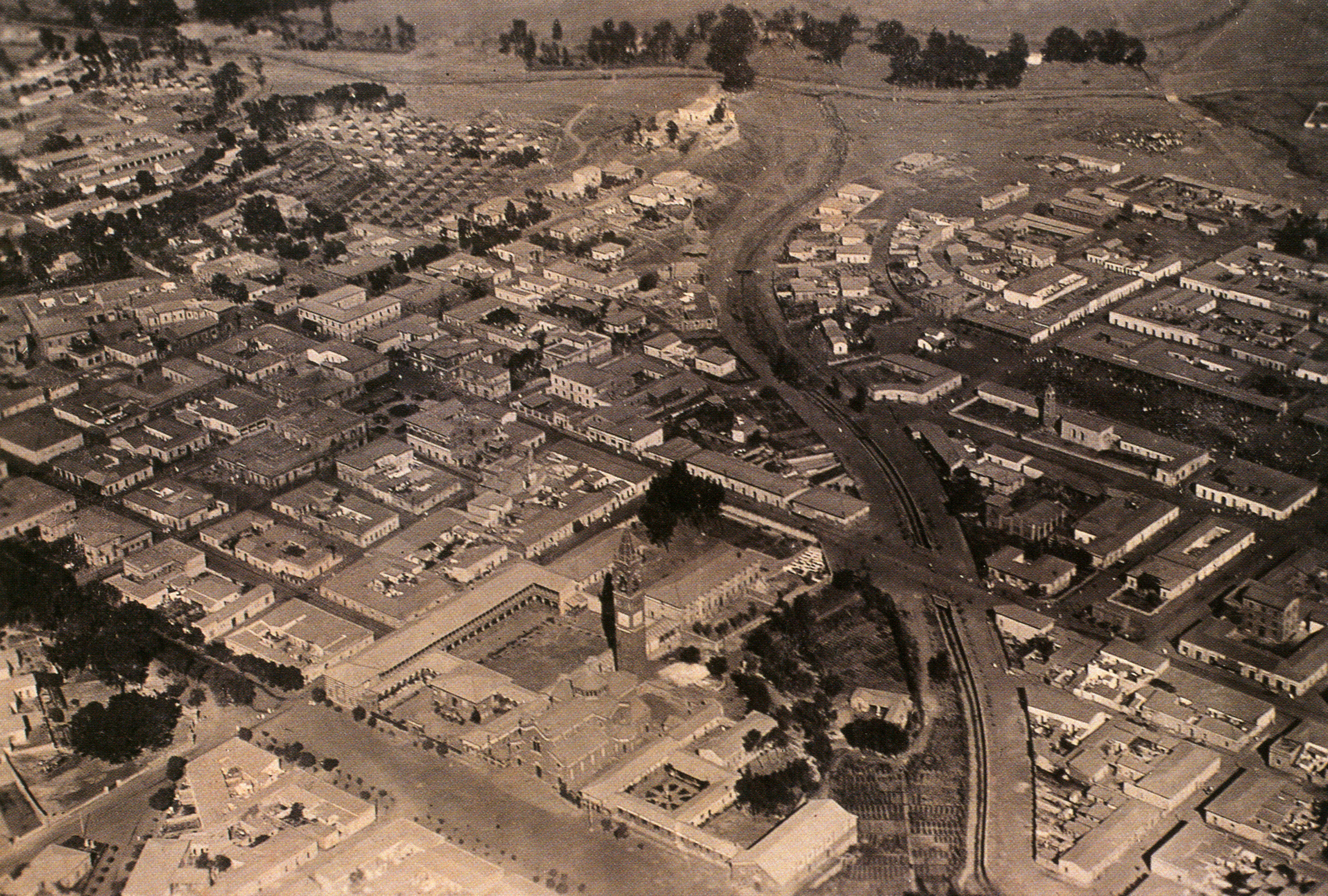
Asmara in the 1930s

With the plan to invade Ethiopia and to incorporate it into the African colony, Asmara's cityscape began to change. More and more soldiers were being stationed in Eritrea, and the city had only a short time to manage a rapid increase in its population. Between 1932 and 1936 alone, the number of inhabitants rose from 18,000 to 98,000 people. Until 1935, administrative and commercial structures were expanded in order to build up Asmara as a military base for the upcoming war. The village became a bustling administrative city and a trading hub, that required its new inhabitants to address its rising sanitation, building, transportation, and safety needs. And so, housing, businesses, recreation services, as well as churches appeared out of thin air in a matter of a few short years.

In 1935, Italy, a significant colonial power, had already occupied Eritrea for nearly 40 years. The fascist regime nevertheless aspired to expand its colony located on the Horn of Africa. Already in 1896, Italy had unsuccessfully battled Adwa with the aim of taking Ethiopia. Driven by this disgrace, in 1935, Italian troops invaded the Abyssinian Empire without any declaration of war. Asmara, because of its location in the highlands, was an ideal military location, which offered Europeans a relatively comfortable climate and was a good site strategically. And so, Asmara became the main supply base for the Italian offensive during the Abyssinian War. With a vengeance, the regime under Mussolini set its sights on taking the kingdom. With nearly 400,000 men and 450 aircraft – these were half of the Regia Aeronautica – the Italian forces were far superior to the Abyssinians. The Italians also had the support of the Askari, who followed the Italian troops during the war. During the war against Ethiopia, 60,000 Askari fought on the Italian side. In the almost one-year-long fight, during which even poison gas was used, around 150,000 Abyssinians were killed. Historian Hans Woller marks the war in Abyssinia as the bloodiest military conflict to take place after WWI.

After claiming victory following the bloody siege of Addis Ababa in May 1936, which ended the war, the African colony – called Orientale Italiana by Italians – now included Eritrea, Ethiopia, and extensive stretches of land along the coast of Somalia; it was, as a result, the third largest colonial empire in the world. On May 9, 1936, from the Palazzo Venezia, Benito Mussolini announced to a jubilant crowd: "L'Italia ha finalmente il suo Impero" [Italy finally has its empire]. "Im Konzert der Mächte trat das faschistische Kriegsregime fortan als zweites Imperium Romanum auf, das in Ostafrika – wie einst die Römer rund um das Mittelmeer – eine, wie sie es nannten ‚Zivilisierungsmission’ zu erfüllen hätte." Only ten days after the proclamation of the Empire, Mussolini ordered the construction of a new transportation infrastructure in East Africa. A road network 2850 kilometers long would expand across the entire colony. At last, the hour of city planning and designing had arrived.

Mattioli labels Italian East Africa as "a playground for architects and city planners.” After the war, Italian East Africa was to become a settlement colony. With its six administrative districts, anywhere between 1 and 6.5 million Italians from the motherland could reside in the city. The effort to colonize the Horn of Africa with Europeans required an enormous amount of infrastructure planning. Streets, administrative facilities, housing, and commercial buildings had to be planned out and built. Additionally, engineers, architects, and urban planners who had invested interests in living out their creative urges on the playground of East Africa were needed. Just a week after the proclamation of the empire, the most influential architect in the regime, Marcello Piacentini, turned to Mussolini and proposed that he be hired to coordinate the necessary construction projects under one general plan. Never before in history had such an opportunity presented itself: to systematically control the architectonic aspects and urban development of a territory that had been, until this time, completely untouched by any previous "civilization initiatives", Piacentini said.

=== Fascist segregation ===
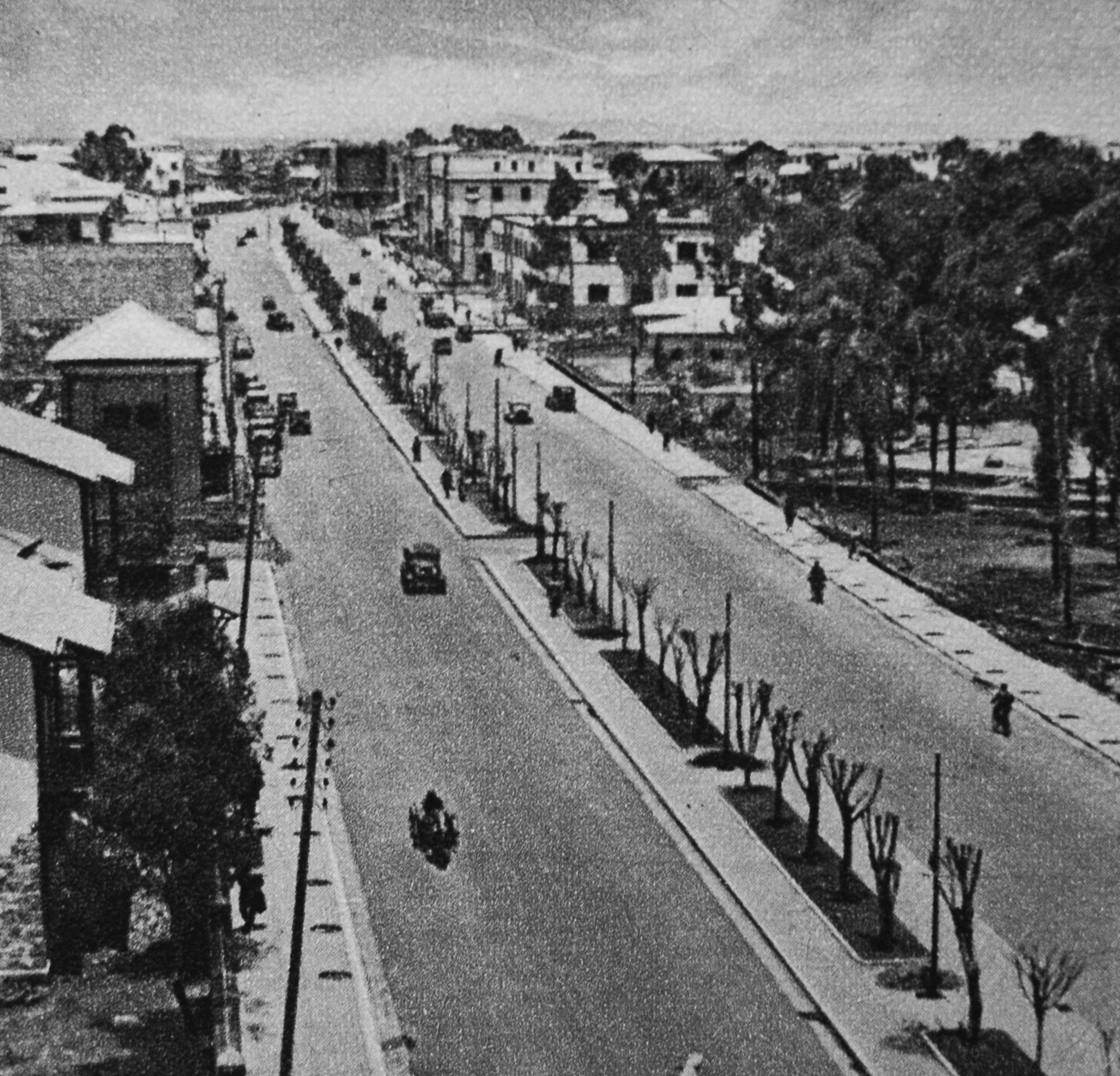
An avenue in Asmara. This avenue served to segregate the two sides of the city.

An announcement made in 1936, stipulated that Italian architects and city planners would not just be those who were marginally aligned with fascist ideology, but those who wholeheartedly support it. In his speech, the architect Carlo Quadrelli outlined the basic principles that architects in the colonies should follow when handling the housing issue, which he formulated as follows:

[...] I consider the following basic principles to be essential:

1. Without question, the conviction that the white man is the ruler and therefore has the right to all conceivable privileges;
2. That, consequently, the law ^{[j]}is one thing for the whites, and another thing for the natives;
3. That the houses and dwellings of whites are always the first priority when solving any architectonic problem; indigenous dwellings, on the other hand, are only of interest to the whites if solving a problem with them would improve the wellbeing of the white population;
4. That there are to be no whites and coloreds living together in the same house;
5. That the white man's house must be outfitted with the best comforts available as it is preferable if he can enjoy his time in the colony, and because he should be able to enjoy the privileges that come with being white.

But it was not only Italian architects who sought council with Mussolini in hopes of having their ideas realized under the Duce's rule. Le Corbusier wanted his own plans implemented on the East African "playground", and from 1932 onwards, he continuously pursued the opportunity to meet privately with Mussolini. His attempts were made in vain, however, and so he wrote to the Italian ambassador in Brazil and recommended that the social structure of the residential city of Addis Abeba be abolished. He made concrete plans for a dominant central axis that would strictly separate the Europeans' residential neighborhoods from the indigenous population. This abrasive plan based on segregation did not take any of the local traditions nor the existing city structure into account.

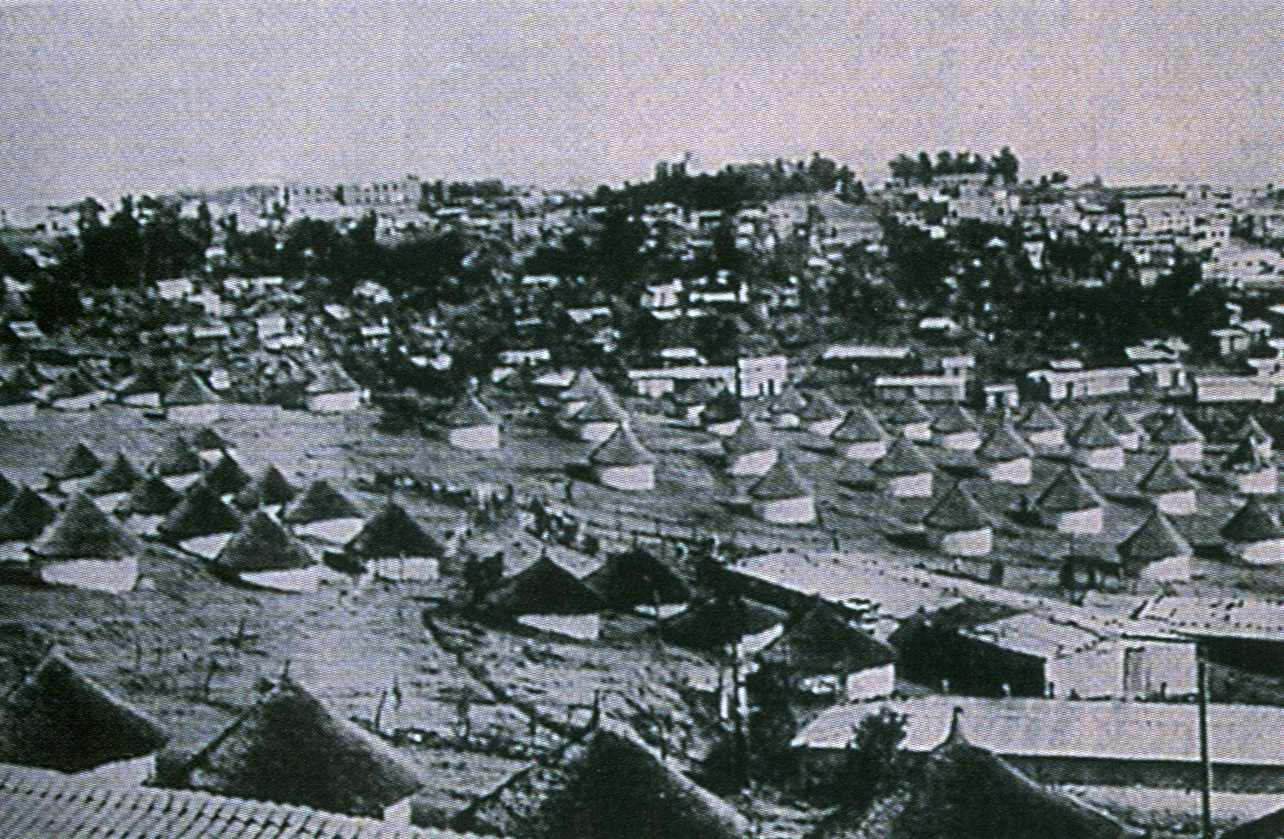
Housing for the local population (Askari)

Independent of Le Corbusier, the policies requiring the strict racial separation of the population were followed. Not only was the separation of races of the utmost importance when writing development policy for implementation in East Africa, the urge to perpetuate fascist ideology through urban planning without regard for existing structures and cultures was as well. Just as in Italy, architecture and urban construction policies were deployed in the colony in a dialectic of destruction and radical new design. The concepts of dominance, order, and racial segregation were to be inscribed in the cities of the Impero. "In the second half of the 1930s, Mussolini's urban planners designed projects that treated settlements in Italian East Africa not as historic cities but as tabula rasa." They regarded the people of East Africa as "barbarians" who did not live in real cities, and who did not have the right kind of housing nor culture. In order to realize the plans of an imperial spatial order, planners under Mussolini did not hesitate to destroy entire historical districts.

From 1935 to 1940, one large project known as Africa Orientale Italiana consumed about twenty percent of the entire Italian national budget. These enormous financial expenses illustrate the importance of the little colony on the Horn of Africa. Mussolini was obsessed with the idea of the Impero, not least of all because it brought him great sympathy in his home country. When looking at the importance of the colony for the fascist regime as well as for the Italians, it quickly becomes clear that Asmara was not a meaningless colonial city "just somewhere" in Africa. Asmara stood for colonial triumph. The attention that the city attracted in the Eritrean highlands provided an ideal platform from which to demonstrate political, economic and social superiority.

=== Infrastructure booming ===
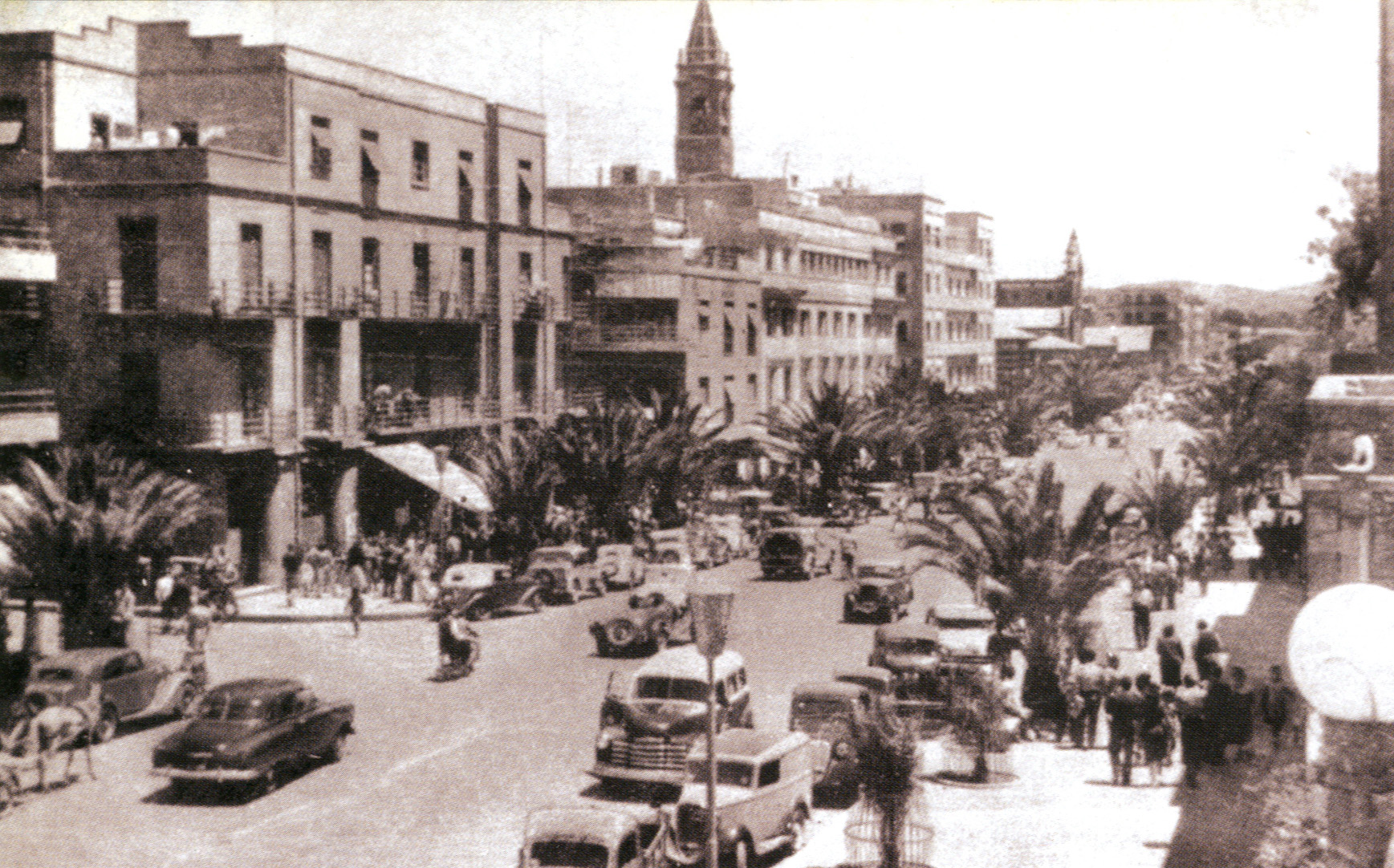
Viale Mussolini (today Harnet Avenue) in 1930s Asmara

After 1936, the cities in East Africa experienced a genuine building boom. As stormy as the city can be because of its location 2,350 meters above sea level, urban development did not take off anywhere else during the Africa Orientale Italiana project like it did in Asmara. The victory over Abyssinia represents a turning point in the history of Asmara, and the years up to 1941 were to become the Eritrean capital's most formative.

In order to meet the demand for new buildings, many workers were brought to Asmara. There was plenty of work from 1935 to 1941 in the city whose ability to grow seemed limitless. Initially, locals were only hired to complete menial tasks. This changed, however at the end of the 1930s, as the high number of European workers was simply too expensive. Funds for construction work were mainly provided by the Italian state. Asmara soon became known as the most advanced center of the Impero and was celebrated as Piccola Roma. In a guidebook from 1938, Asmara was presented as the most graceful Italian city with an average population size; it was portrayed as being completely new and full of youthful energy directed towards achieving a truly imperial future. This youthful energy was especially reflected in the funicular railroad built in 1937. It was the longest cableway in the world at that time and connected Asmara with the harbor town of Massawa.

In Asmara, as in other Italian colonial cities, there was no consideration given to the existing settlement structures of the local population. Nearly all traditional huts - the Agdos and Hidmos - were demolished to clear the way for new construction projects. Only in the north, in the official indigenous settlement, did Agdos and Hidmos remain untouched and isolated from the development taking place elsewhere in the city. After the destruction of most of the huts in Asmara, 45,000 local residents were moved to the citta indigene.

In the 1930s, the city map became the most important topic of discussion in the field of modern architecture. From the point of view of the international representatives of the New Building (Neues Bauen) Movement, cities had not yet adapted to the demands of the machine age. The architects and planners of this movement criticized the orderlessness of the cities and warned that the basic biological, psychological, and hygienic needs of the inhabitants were at risk. To them, this lack of order in Asmara always meant that the plans for complete racial segregation had not yet been fully implemented. With the resettlement of the locals and the demolition of the Agdos and Hidmos, developers had gained additional room for growth in the middle of the 1930s. Italian architects were faced with a wealth of new, extensive building tasks. The designers of the New Building Movement deliberately broke away from the tradition of classical Italian architecture, but also from local African architecture. In Asmara's historic city center, there is only one building that is recognizable as Eritrean architecture and as stemming from Eritrean culture. It cannot be said that Asmara is a fusion of modern architecture and African highland culture, as Edward Denison writes. Aram Mattioli finds much more critical words: "In Asmara, it was not a question of fusing together different cultures, and certainly not an aesthetic, creative reception of European-influenced modernism by African architects, but an imperial and racist societal experiment that used a modern design vocabulary."

From the end of the thirties, when the war against Abyssinia had ended, the Italians concentrated on the expansion of civilian institutions. Soldiers and craftsmen had families that had followed them, thus the city had to move forward with the expansion of educational institutions and housing. At that time, ideas about a policy of racial segregation were being articulated more and more clearly. This was, however, not only the tenor of Italian politicians; racial separation was the standard for all European colonial powers in Africa. In 1937, a law came into effect that criminalized cohabitation of Italian citizens and black women. One year later, the regime's implementation of radical racial laws followed. The laws took into account all areas of life, and were not only meant to pursue social and political objectives, but also biological and economic goals. Above all else, though, they served to emphasize the superiority and the racialized hierarchical position of the occupiers, as well as to secure a place among the privileged for the future. And so, it was hardly surprising that the architect Cafiero was commissioned in 1938 to create a new development plan for Asmara. He was to express the new racial laws in a plan and to rearrange the city with a vision of racial segregation in mind. Therefore, in Asmara, racial segregation was pursued from the legal level as well as from the different but intersecting level of urban planning. However there were famous Italian architects -live Rava- who complained against this segregation promoted (after 1937) by the growing links of Mussolini with Hitler's nazism. They complained that Asmara was going to be populated mostly by Italians in a few decades and a small minority of native population (of only 10%) could be integrated easily (or moved to live in small satellite villages around the city).

=== Imposition of radical separation policies ===
In Italian plans, the Italians in Asmara were going to have the living standards available in modern cities of western Europe, but also the native Eritreans were going to have an improvement (even if minor) in their living standards. In proportion, the improvement for the Eritreans would be higher because their original conditions were extremely low.

However, the restructuring of Asmara was difficult. Asmara had grown rapidly in recent years, and urban life had already taken hold in most parts of the city.

In order to carry out the separation of races imposed by Mussolini's alliance with Hitler, Cafiero used the pre-existing zones. The mixed neighborhood around the market square now served as a buffer zone to clearly distinguish the settlements of the natives in the north from the neighborhoods of the occupiers in the south and west. This buffer zone, consisting of the industrial and commercial sectors, was to be the only area in the city where white and black people could meet. However, access was permitted only to educated Eritreans. In addition, a green stripe was painted along what is now known as Segeneyti Street, which served as an additional barrier that locals were not allowed to cross. Cafiero anticipated that one hectare of land would be allocated for every 380 locals, while only 140 Italians would inhabit the same amount of space in their zone.

Not just the residential areas would be separated from each other according to racial doctrine. Planners ensured that there were racially segregated restaurants, theaters, infirmaries, churches, brothels, and sometimes even separate access routes to the different functional zones of their cities.

Mussolini's racial laws called for a complete separation of the population along racial lines. This new strategy was far more brutal and saw the persecution of Eritreans taken to a new level.

Fearing that political antagonists might begin to pop up among the educational elite, Eritreans' access to schools was reduced to a minimum. There could be no doubt as to who was the master and who was the slave, and to ensure this remained the case, an educational system was set up which limited the entire school career of black children to three years. There were absolutely no other schools for these children to attend.

The living conditions for the Eritrean population in Asmara were bad. The locals' quarters were completely neglected in the plans of the architects and city planners. There are no avant-garde buildings erected by the young aspirants of the 1930s; the roads remained unpaved and the connections to the electricity and water supply did not find their way into the neighborhoods in the north; there was no foundation for establishing an intact infrastructure for medical, educational, or sanitation facilities. The Italian population lived only a few meters away. By 1941 water connections and a sewer system were installed in the Europeans' zones. Medical infrastructure was secured, and people enjoyed strolling up and down the streets, which were lined with trees and plants, and always guarded by patrolling police.

=== Architectural development under the Italian regime ===
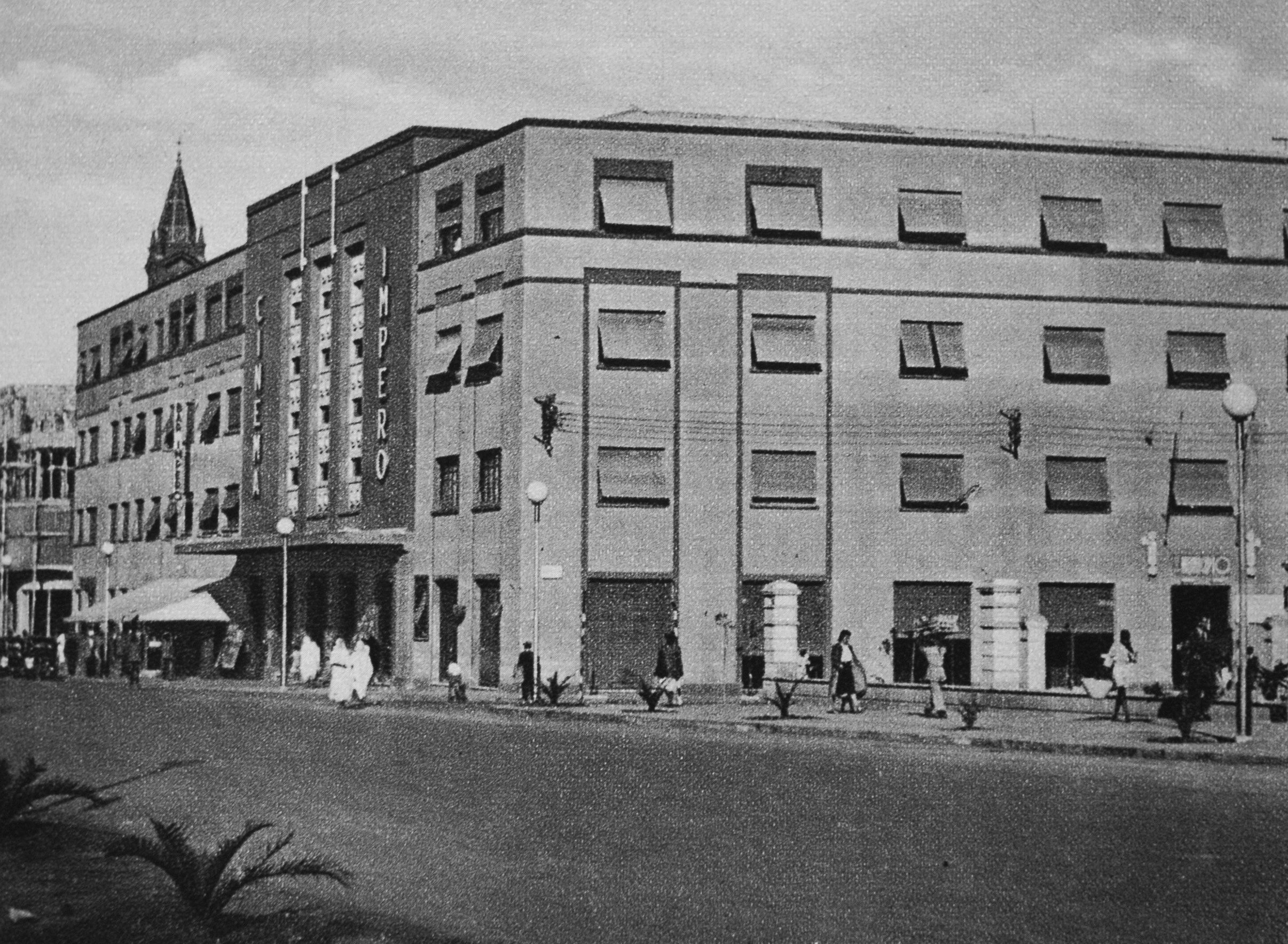
Cinema Impero (1930s)

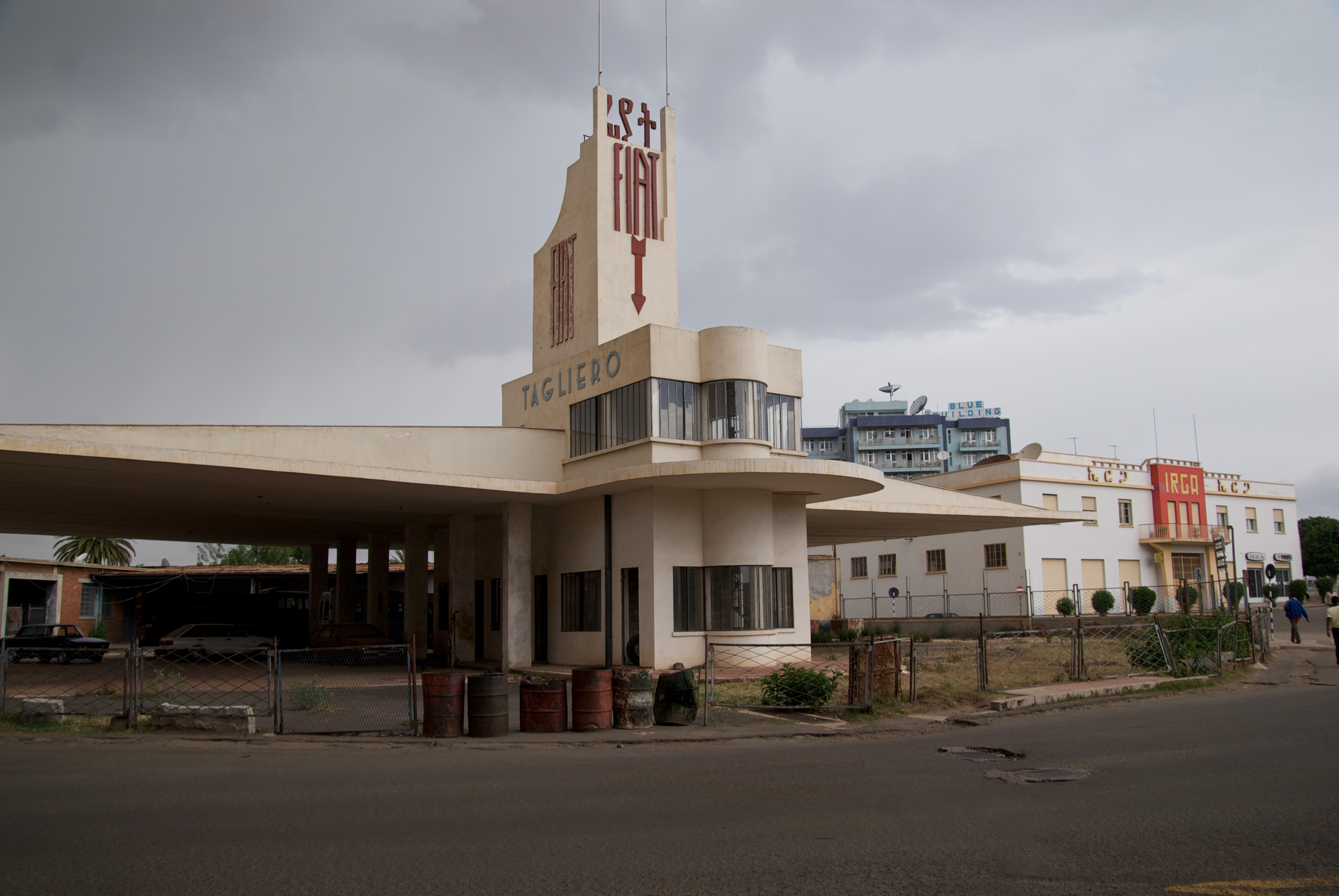
Fiat Tagliero petrol station in Asmara

The Italian occupiers designed Asmara according to their ideas. So that they did not miss anything while in the East African colony, bars, restaurants, brothels and cinemas sprouted up all over the city. The high density of cinemas in Asmara is still as impressive today as it was back then. At the end of the 1930s, numerous cinemas had been built, all within the shortest possible timeframe, including Cinema Impero (1937), Cinema Capitol (1938), Cinema Roma (1937) and Cinema Odeon (1937). All of these cinemas were accessible exclusively to Europeans, but locals were also to have their own cinema. In 1936, the architect Inginio Marabelli built Cinema Hamasien in the city's northern zone. Over time, the number of leisure activities meant to entertain the colonial masters increased exponentially. There were golf courses, tennis clubs, soccer tournaments, bicycle racing clubs, and motorsport events.

Motorsport events were held in Asmara for a reason. At the end of the 1930s, the number of Italian-made automobiles exported to Eritrea had exploded. Within a few years, the traffic volume in Asmara was higher than it was in Rome. With approximately 50,000 cars in Asmara in 1938, there were officially enough for each Italian in the city to have one. In the years 1936-1938, 15,158 cars and 13,719 motorcycles from different manufacturers were delivered to East Africa. This constituted about a fifth of the auto industry's total exports in 1938, and in 1937, about half. The automotive industry flourished in Asmara. Not only did the number of domestic car imports grow steadily in Italy, but automobile companies themselves built prestigious branches in the Eritrean highlands to improve their image and sales as well. In the 1930s, for example, these automobile companies commissioned architects to design their representative offices in Asmara. Oftentimes, unknown architects and engineers were planning and constructing state-of-the-art buildings for the most important automobile companies in the world. Among the clients were Agip, Pirelli, Alfa Romeo, Lancia, and, of course, Fiat. Even the leading automobile club in Italy, RACI, opened a branch in the Eritrean capital to attract new members from the growing group of citizens with cars. The use of avant-garde architecture was a convenient means through which to attract the attention of potential car buyers, and the colony in East Africa offered the most ideal conditions for creating such striking structures. In Italy, architects had to tolerate the limitations of old building structures. In Asmara, on the other hand, the designers had no specific restrictions. Far from what the motherland was able to provide, Eritrea offered the best conditions for innovative and experimental architecture.

It is not the case that Asmara consists only of buildings commissioned by Mussolini or his governors. It is true, however, that all town measures, including development plans, were always managed by the occupying regime, which included what was possible and permissible in terms of building development. In reality, private individuals and, above all, industry, owned a large share of the city, including many individual buildings that still characterize the cityscape of Asmara to this day. Built in 1938, the Fiat Tagliero petrol station is a particularly impressive building in the capital city, and is perhaps the most famous. Designed by Italian architect Giuseppe Pettazzi, the gas station takes the form of an airplane with its 30-meter-long, cantilevered, tapered concrete wings, which extend from a tower-like central structure. The aircraft was an important symbol for the futurists at this time because it symbolized progress and speed. Frequently, architects used the symbolism of the airplane to demonstrate how superiority was achieved through progress.

Buildings that were meant to symbolize the progress of the time were the Shell Service Station (1937), which is reminiscent of a passing vessel with its porthole-shaped windows and its curves, or the Bar Zilli building, which is shaped like a radio from the thirties. From the main entrance, the same number of windows and doors appear at regular intervals, distributed in perfect symmetry. The round windows are meant to remind onlookers of radio knobs. Another one of Asmara's symbolic buildings is the former headquarters of the Fascist Party; today it houses the Ministry of Education. The house looks like an "F" lying on its back. This was no coincidence, as the "F" in this case stood for Fascismo.

Time and again, the Italian architects designed buildings that stood for progress. Unlike in Italy or in Nazi Germany, there were no oversized monumental buildings constructed in Asmara. Nevertheless, the architectural styles and currents of the time are very present, and by taking a look at the context in which these buildings were constructed, the fascist ideology is also reflected in the present-day city landscape. In this demonstrative way, the modern was vividly juxtaposed with the unmodern, symbolizing the so-called superiority of the Italians over the Eritreans. Unlike Hitler, Mussolini was open to modern architecture. He had a passion for speed, automobiles, and airplanes, which is reflected in many of Asmara's buildings. Mussolini stood for classical tradition and, simultaneously, for modernism as it was conceived of by futurists and rationalists.

In the years between 1935 and 1941, numerous buildings in the styles of Rationalismo and Novecento were erected within an area, and although many others were planned, they would never be realized. The buildings ranged from small, one-story apartments to giant high-rise office buildings. About 10 years after Gruppo 7 had outlined its basic principles for reforming Italian architecture in La Rassegna Italiana magazine, numerous buildings were built in Asmara according to these specifications. The group's principles were based on the idea that architecture had to be rational and reduced to simple forms, and that all architectural ornamentation had to be renounced.

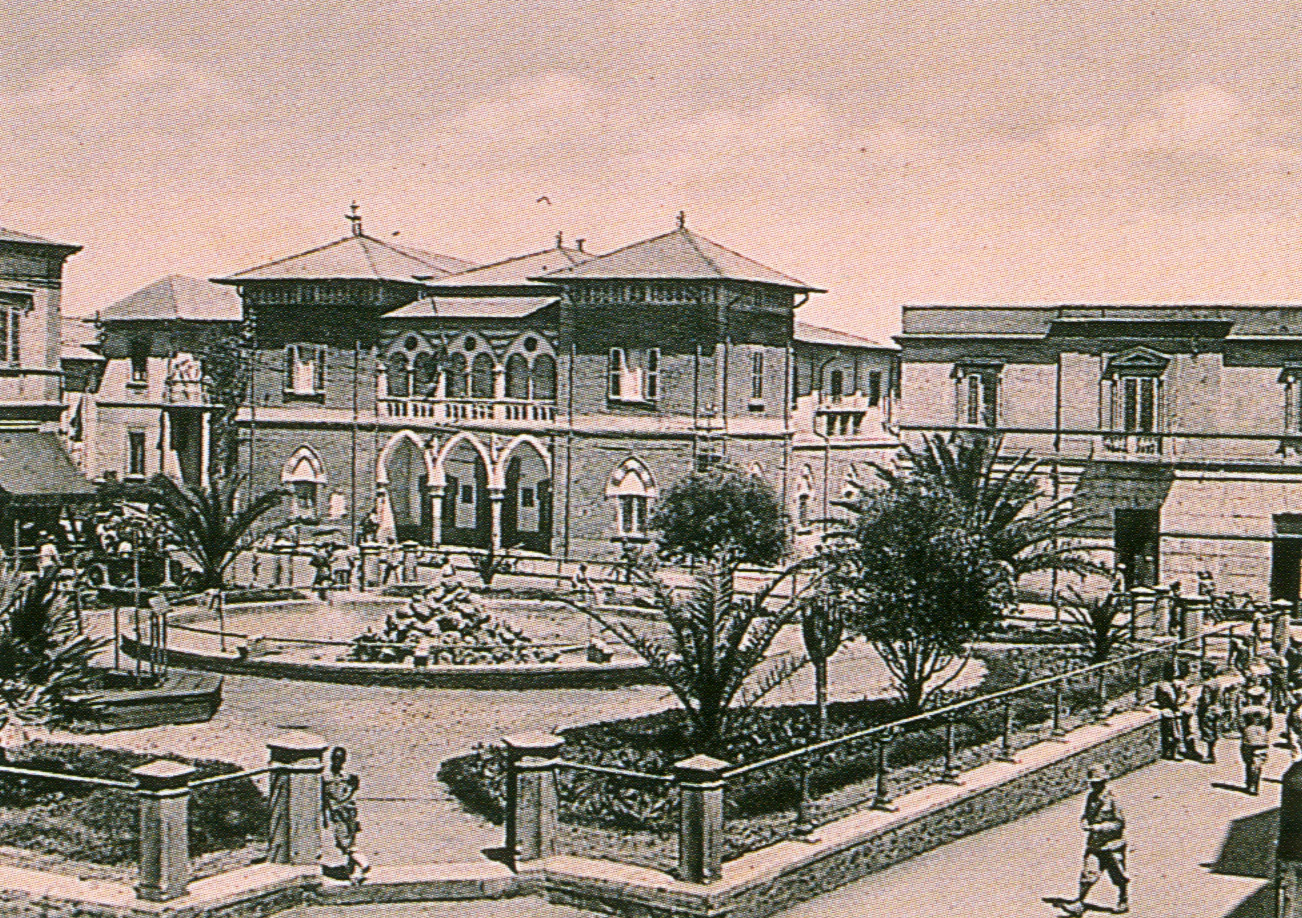
Piazza Roma in Asmara (1930s)

In addition to numerous buildings, the colonial administration also built roads and squares, which were also supposed to represent the fascist regime and its power over the Eritrean population. The Viale Mussolini (today Harnet Avenue), the Piazza Roma (today Post Square) and the Viale de Bono (today Semeatat Boulevard) were built to unite the masses and to display the power of the occupiers in the form of festivals, parades and marches. With its administrative buildings, the Cinema Impero, the theater, St. Joseph's Cathedral, high-rise apartment buildings, and numerous bars and shops, Viale Mussolini was the center of the city. As the day faded into the night, Viale Mussolini was used as a promenade – the so-called Passeggiata. Italians walked up and down the street without any particular aim. The indigenous population, however, had no access to the palm-lined boulevard during the day or at night.

The idea that Asmara would continue to grow steadily was not in question; more and more Italians were moving to the Eritrean highlands. In 1939, 98,000 people were already living in Asmara. Of these, 53,000 were Italians and 45,000 were Eritrean. At the end of the 1930s, the population of Italians living in Asmara peaked around 70,000.

Nearly 4/5 of the inhabitants were Christians, while nearly all spoke Italian and/or vernacular Italian Eritrean.

However, growth would soon come to a screeching halt. During the Second World War, the Great Powers, Italy and the UK, fought battles all across Eritrea. After a nearly one-year-long military operation, Mussolini's troops were finally defeated by the British in 1941. Until the fall of his Empire, Mussolini had never before set foot in Italy’s small colony on the Horn of Africa.

The British must have been very impressed by this European city in Africa. After the capture of Asmara, the British Information Ministry reported that they had conquered a European city with extensive boulevards, fantastic cinemas, outstanding fascist buildings, cafes, shops, two-laned streets, and a first-class hotel. With the British takeover, the compulsive need to build in the Eritrean capital came to an abrupt end.

To this day, an outstanding and perhaps unique collection of modern buildings gives impressive insight into the world of Italian modernist architecture of the 1920s and 1930s. In particular, the avant-garde buildings, which were created between 1935 and 1941 and were designed and realized according to rationalist principles, are looking for their equals across the world. But equally important for the time of the Duce was the policy of racial segregation, especially in Asmara, which was refined in the urban development plans and led to a complete separation of natives and occupiers by the end of the 1930s.

== British Military Administration (1941–1952) ==
=== Under the British occupation ===
On April 1, 1941, after the Allies' victory in Eritrea, Italy was forced to awaken from the dream of having the ideal colony in East Africa, which was already taking shape in Asmara. A transitional administration under British control was established immediately to organize the former colony. As the Second World War came to a close, this administration was renamed the British Military Administration (BMA). The task of officials in the BMA was to oversee the transition of the Italian colony to an undefined political entity. The British occupation did not bring about any significant changes in the construction of cities nor in the architecture of Asmara, but it did mean the beginning of the struggle for independence for the Eritrean people, which was to last 50 years. It would have a decisive impact on the identity of the Asmarinos, especially regarding their relationship to the Italian colonial period, and to a lesser degree on the structural form of Asmara.

The British Empire had no interest in managing the country as a separate colony, and instead spoke of the "Eritrean eradication". The land of the Eritreans was to be divided and distributed to other countries. The highlands, whose population was only referred to as the “Abyssinians” – with the same term they used to refer to the Ethiopians – was to be incorporated into British Sudan, while the lowlands, which the British simply said to be “inhabited by Muslims”, would be given to Ethiopia. It was as a result of these designations that the chief commander of the East Africa Command wanted only to provide 19 military officers to the administration of Eritrea, including Brigadier General Kennedy-Cooke, eight British officers including Major J K Harvey, and nine Sudanese police officers. Major Harvey was Chief Custodian of Enemy Property and was one of the few Officers of the British Army to be the recipient of an illuminated address from the people on the enemy side. This tribute he received at the close of a distinguished career in Eritrea. Since the British were still in the middle of the war and resources were needed in other places, the Italian administrators, who had for the most part not left Asmara, decided to continue to manage the country – now under the supervision of the British. All departments except the police were left to the Italians. Through the use of anti-fascist propaganda, an agreement was made with the Italian population, which consisted of approximately 60,000 people suffering from food and water shortages.

The 100,000 Eritreans in Asmara suffered from the same shortages, lived under poorer sanitary and building conditions, and had to accept displaced people from all over Eritrea, but were hardly supported by the BMA. At the beginning of the 1940s the Askari, who had supported the Italian war in Somalia and Libya, returned. The disrespect for the Eritrean population was demonstrated in part by the deployment of the divide et impera [divide and conquer] strategy. The traditional system rooted in an understanding of the importance of citizen participation, which to a certain extent had survived the Italian colonial era, was undermined by the BMA. Political divisions were encouraged in order to prevent the population from engaging in decision-making processes. In Tessenei, for example, while political groups were allowed to meet separately, a conference aimed at discussing the future of the region open to all groups was strictly prohibited.

The British administration implemented a policy aimed at rigorously dismantling the country, before handing Eritrea over to Ethiopia, during which it systematically sold manufacturers and their equipment off, sending them abroad or to other British colonies. Among other things, the dry docks in Massawa, a cement factory in Massawa, the Gura airport, the Massawa-Asmara funicular railroad, and parts of the railroad line from Massawa to Asmara were dismantled and shipped to Sudan, Egypt and India. A statement from the terrified council of elders of the former industrial city of Decamhare reads: “the English did not leave behind even pins, not even needles from our factories, they took away everything.” Despite this loss of valuable industrial faculties, Asmara retained its importance as a commercial center.

=== Abolishing Racial Segregation in Asmara ===
Among the British, racial separation was at least partially abolished. A training program for civilian administration was offered to Eritreans for the first time, and the first Eritrean teachers' schools were set up. As a result, from 1943 onwards, schools were open and institutionalized education made accessible for local children at last. Under Italian rule, Eritrean children had been prohibited from attending elementary schools. For this reason, a secret school, which was hidden in the bell tower of the Protestant church, had been established. By 1954, the British Administration had built over 100 schools for locals. In addition, an active public press that published in Tigrinya, Arabic, and English was launched.

An outstanding example of how Italian racial segregation was overcome began on an early morning in 1943. Eritrean workers found no seats on a bus that was to take them from Asmara's outskirts to work in the city center. Consequently, they decided to take the places normally reserved for Italians. As those Italians who were running late began to arrive and find that their seats had been taken, they became outraged, and a fight broke out. The problem was ultimately brought to the British administrator. He stated that he could not initiate any changes as long as the Italian laws were still on the books, but suggested that the Eritreans organize their transport independently. Within a few days, the locals had collected enough money, bought a truck, and nailed benches to the truck bed. Owing to a loss of business, the Italian owner of the bus had no choice but to sell his bus to the Eritreans. The Eritrean workers were now the proud owners of a bus and had free seats.

=== Repression by the British forces ===
With the end of the Second World War, Eritrea was experiencing a severe crisis that had led to rising unemployment. While the Italian population was supported by subsidies, the local population had to fight for survival. This meant that they were stuck trying to reclaim their lands which were formerly expropriated by the Italians and now managed by the British. A deep resentment began to develop from the resulting anger within the indigenous community. In the eyes of the Eritreans, the British Military Administration was worse than the Italians, which they perceived as less duplicitous and sneaky. The BMA seldom kept their promises and used the Eritreans, for example, by imposing high fines if Eritreans peacefully sought to use their right to expression; this led more and more frequently to the development of protests into riots.

In 1946, Sudanese soldiers serving under British mandate massacred 70 Christian residents in the poor Abbu Shaul district. Rapid military intervention on the part of the British would have been the only way this tragedy could have been prevented. At the funeral of the victims, Eritrean Bishop Markos laid an accusation against the British:

“We Abyssinians had longed for the British to come and liberate us from [our] Fascist yoke. We had trusted you to lead us to freedom. But what have you done? You have given us the freedom to die, the only freedom you have given us so far. Neither the Italians nor the British, in whom we had believed, will help us. So we must return to our Mother Ethiopia who will receive her Abyssinian children with open arms.”

Bishop Markos put voice to the way people felt across the country. The hope of liberation, which the Eritreans had once associated with the takeover of the British, gave way to disappointment. At the same time, Markos' words were those of a well-meaning Ethiopian. A long-standing desire for political change was palpable: "[...] most Eritreans (Christians and Muslims) were united in their goal of freedom and independence." The voices of the local population were, however, split between separatists and supporters of reunification with Ethiopia. Separatist movements gained ground, however, according to a classified estimate by the US Department of State in August 1949, and about 75% of Eritreans supported independence.

An Eritrean delegation to the UN General Assembly in 1952 noted that the ideas presented there regarding Eritreans future strongly suggested that Eritrea be given to the US-backed Ethiopia. Haile Selassie had already spent a lot of energy on building a positive relationship with the United States. In 1950, he had sent members of his own security service to support U.S. troops in the Korean War, and in the same year had signed a contract that would allow the U.S. to build a strategically-located military command center in Eritrea. The United States itself did not recognize Eritrea as a sovereign nation, instead saw it for its strategic value: “From the point of view of justice, the opinions of the Eritrean people must receive consideration. Nevertheless, the strategic interests of the United States in the Red Sea basin and considerations of security and world peace make it necessary that the country has to be linked with our ally, Ethiopia.” Finally, the Ethiopians' wishes were fulfilled, and Eritrea became an Ethiopian province.

== Ethiopian occupation and war (1952–1993) ==
=== Losing its capital ===
Two assumptions have dominated the discussion about the relationship between Ethiopia and Eritrea over the past 70 years. First, during Haile Selassie’s regime, the Ethiopian people and the international community first became aware of the idea that Eritrea is a natural and logical part of Ethiopia. A common history, religion and culture, as well as the belief that Eritrea is Ethiopia's access to the sea, were ideas used to serve as support for this viewpoint. The second premise, supplemented by the first, is that Eritrea was economically weak, and its survival was dependent on Ethiopian resources. The country had been cut off ethnically and linguistically, being merely an "Italian creation without the conditions for a state." Leading world powers like the United States and Great Britain supported this viewpoint in order to meet their own strategic needs, thereby leading the still relatively young UN in initiating a process of federation through which Eritrea would be subsumed under the Ethiopian crown.

Thus, according to a federal act passed in 1952 in the United Nations, Eritrea was to be bound to Ethiopia as an autonomous region, despite the fact that this did not at all reflect the will of the people. Asmara had to give up its title as a capital, and subsequently sank slowly into provinciality in the years that followed. Referring to the question of Eritrea's federation with Ethiopia, journalist John Gunther noted in 1955 that "a joke of the period said that the solution finally adopted was 'a Bolivian concept of a Swiss federation adapted to an African absolute monarchy,'" in reference to the Bolivian United Nations commissioner Eduardo Anze Mateinzo. Though Asmara did not undergo any noteworthy changes to its appearance during Ethiopian occupation, the shift in how Eritreans understood their identity was dramatic as they struggled under new foreign rule. The almost 40 years from 1952 to independence in 1991 were decisive in terms of understanding what is happening with policy in Eritrea today, and thus also for dealing with the country’s legacy.

Ethiopia has consistently interpreted Federalism in ways that have benefited itself. The Ethiopian state did not leave Eritrea any room for development, although according to the Eritrean Pact, the responsibilities of each of the three branches of government in the separation of powers model were to be carried out independently. The President of the Eritrean National Council, Ali Redai, filed a complaint against the British Consul: "Ethiopians never answered letters, never gave answers to specific queries, and in fact ignored the Eritrean government." Almost all of the administrative bodies and offices were occupied by Ethiopian officials, and the Ethiopian military was reportedly in Eritrea for security reasons. Customs, postal, telecommunications, railway, defense, justice, and transportation operations were all run by Ethiopians - most of them inefficiently.

=== Stagnation in urban development ===
Government officials in Addis Abeba constantly introduced ever-stricter laws. Eritrean political parties were banned, the Eritreans were prohibited from collecting their portion of customs and tax earnings, and Eritrean newspapers were censored. While the early years of the Selassie regime saw some significant developments in Asmara, such as the construction of churches, mosques, schools, and hospitals, later a lack of investment and a decline in industrial activities led to the stagnation of urban development in the city. The few industries remaining after the retreat of the British were dismantled and relocated to Addis Abeba to ensure that every economic capacity of the country was undermined. In 1959, native languages Tigrinya and Arabic were forbidden as instructional languages in schools and universities, and instead Amharic was introduced; for many Eritreans, this meant that making any progress in their education had become impossible. Student protests and boycotts called by civil officials and factory workers were answered by the Ethiopian police with increasing violence. A general strike in 1958, left many dead and injured, and in other protests Eritreans were arrested or forced into exile. Appeals to the United Nations were ignored.

The change of the road names in Asmara also had a significant impact on the city’s identity. In honor of a visit by the British Queen in 1965, Haile Selassie renamed Viale de Bono, now Nakfa Avenue, Queen Elizabeth II Avenue. The central Corso Italia, today Harnet Avenue, which was still called Viale Benito Mussolini before the British occupation, was renamed Haile Selassie I Boulevard. Almost all of Asmara’s street names were changed during Ethiopian occupation in order to repress the memory of the Italian past and to establish Ethiopian authority in regard to the city’s identity itself.

=== Annexation by Ethiopia and emerging resistance movement ===
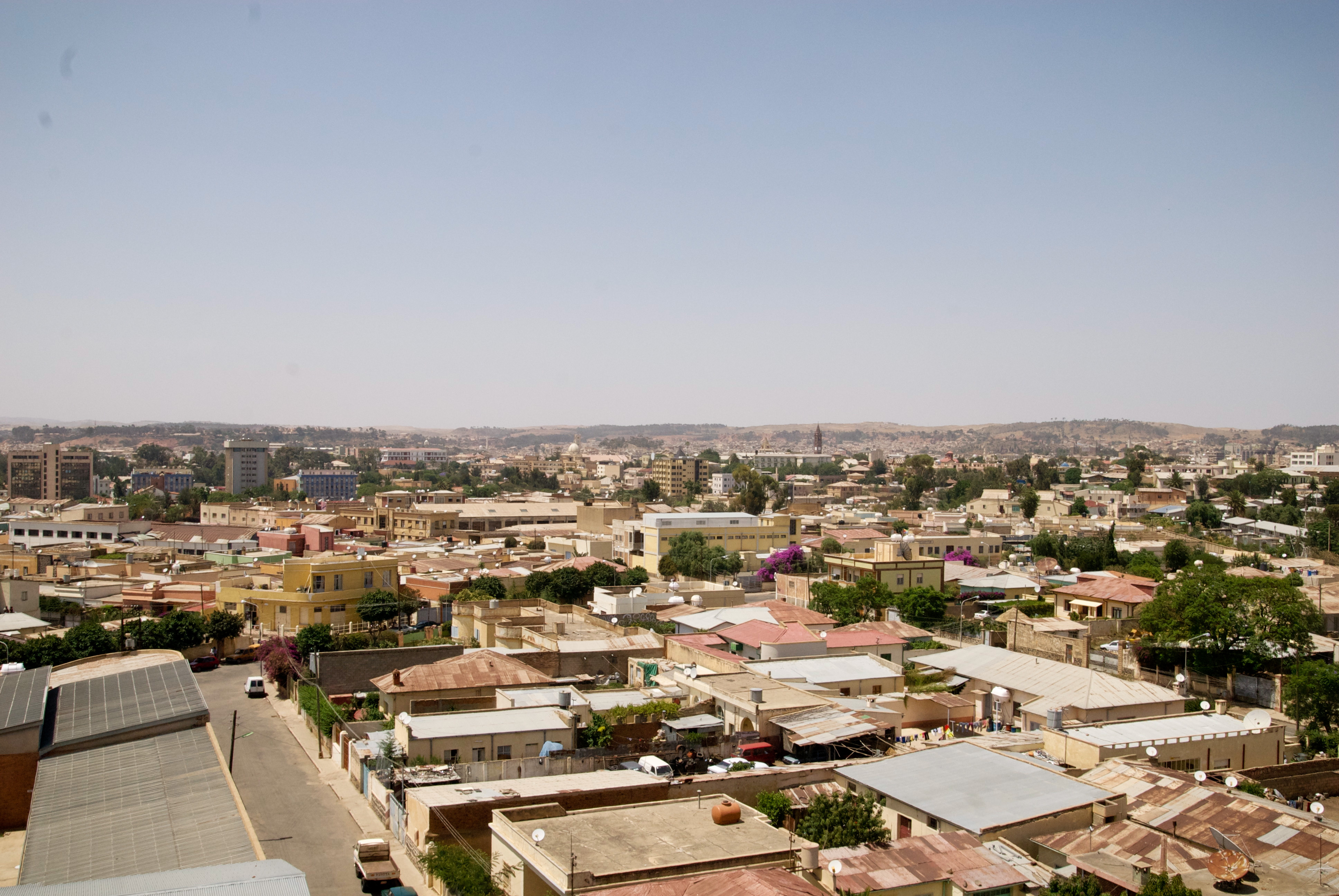
View of Asmara

Haile Selassie, in an open policy, did not hide the fact that Ethiopia "is interested in the country and not in the people of Eritrea", especially with regard to Muslim communities, whose villages were systematically burnt down by Ethiopian troops, and whose inhabitants were massacred throughout the 1950s, 1960s, and during the first half of the 1970s. Haile Selassie dissolved Eritrea's autonomy bit by bit, for example, through the demotion of the autonomous government to a mere administrative body in 1960. Two years later, with the United Nations' approval, Ethiopia decided to ultimately end the federation. Through the besiegement of Asmara, Ethiopia forced the Eritrean parliament to dissolve itself completely, and subsequently annexed the whole of Eritrea. Soon after, Eritrean opposition leaders came to the conclusion that the only hope of resisting Ethiopian rule lay in armed struggle.

In 1974, when Haile Selassie was overthrown, the resistance movement was fighting not only a daring guerrilla war against the Ethiopian army, but also a bitter internal struggle. The movement had long since broken apart into hostile factions, mostly because of differing political views. The Eritrean People's Liberation Front (EPLF), which was founded around 1970, finally succeeded in recruiting many former enemy fighters. Fighters' passion was for the war of independence and less so for handling the movement's internal conflicts, so the fragmentation had no lasting effect on the unity of the Eritreans. The central strength of the resistance's struggle for independence was the active encouragement of members from all religious communities associated with the movement to participate.

In the meantime, the Derg, the Ethiopian military junta from 1974 to 1987, had a similar Eritrean policy as its predecessor, Haile Selassie, though with much more brutal means and the support of the Soviets, Cubans and East Germans. Asmara was transformed from an attractive city into a largely isolated military camp through what was known as the "Red Terror". Ethiopian army divisions occupied entire districts, displacing inhabitants. Italian buildings were turned into prisons. Yet, Asmara's importance as a trade center grew and, contrary to all expectations, was left almost unscathed. Building activity in Asmara even recovered slowly, with the construction of individual high-rise buildings, as well as an expansion of the city administration building and the Ambassador Hotel located on present-day Harnet Avenue. Perhaps it was the limitations on urban development during this period that ultimately saved Asmara’s character. Particularly noteworthy is the monumental stadium on Bahti-Meskerem Square at the eastern end of Harnet Avenue. The monstrous concrete terraces were originally supposed to stand on both sides of the square to allow room for the communist rulers' political and military to take place. However, only one part has been completed, so that today there is mostly just a barren landscape - an appropriate memorial to the iron-fisted Derg regime.

=== Independence from Ethiopia ===
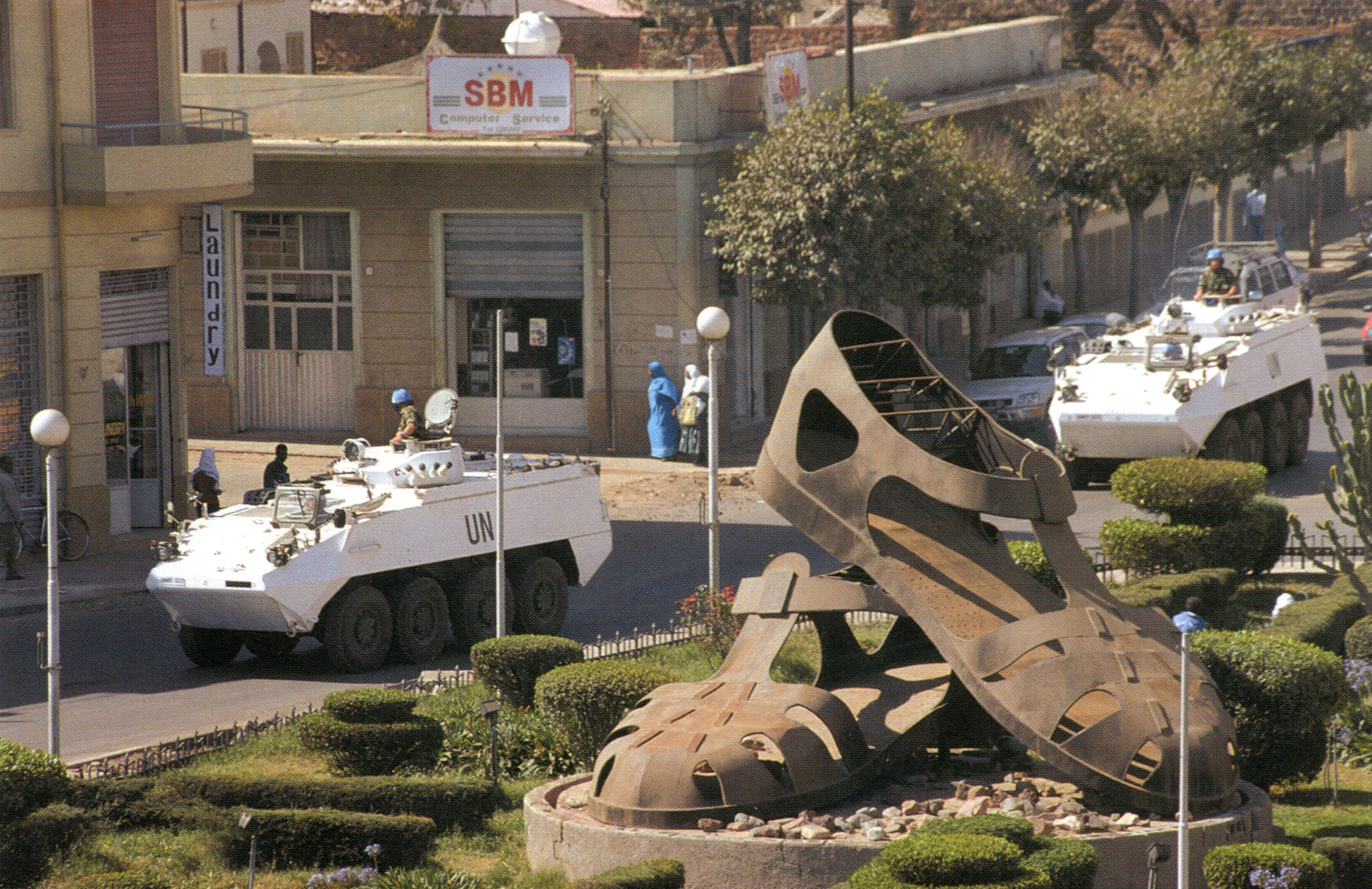
Monument to independence fighters in Asmara

Towards the end of the 1980s, the Soviet Union decided against extending the cooperation agreement with Ethiopia. Without the resources of the Soviet Union, and due to a drought and simultaneous economic crisis in both countries, the morale of Ethiopian soldiers fell. Many of them served as mercenaries without real conviction for the fight against the Eritrean resistance, which allowed members of the sworn EPLF to edge their way into Ethiopian positions. In May 1991, under the pressure of the Ethiopian opposition the Derg regime finally fell. EPLF talks with the Ethiopian Transitional Government were successful, thereby allowing Eritrea to hold a referendum on its independence. The overwhelming majority, 99.83% of Eritrean people, voted for their country’s independence, and on May 24, 1993, Eritrea was declared an independent country. A new parliament was established and then elected Isayas Afewerki, prominent head of the EPLF, as president.

The armed conflict between Ethiopia and Eritrea lasted for almost 30 years. It is a remarkable history of human resistance on the one hand, and of terrible loss suffered by two of the world's poorest countries, on the other. The Eritrean people, themselves the product of a compulsory unification carried out by an outside power, fought, for the most part, alone against the statistically superior and better equipped Ethiopian army, while both Ethiopian regimes were ready to do their own as well as the Americans’ and the Soviets’ bidding in the most brutal ways, at least until the fall of Haile Selassie.

What made this conflict even more destructive was that the Eritreans fought each other during the war for a long time. Unified in the desire to gain control over their own country, however, they were able to create a coherent ideological framework within a short period of time. Considering the fact that Eritrea is a land of unequal tribes, three religions, and both urban and nomadic cultures, the successful outcome of the war, the unification of its many diverse people, and the declaration of the country’s independence, were all tremendous achievements. And with the coronation, regarded by some as the ultimate paradox of war and by others simply as a miracle, Eritreans’ capital, Asmara, survived the many years of warfare almost entirely unscathed. Its inhabitants today still reaffirm the unifying aim of the struggle: "Asmara is what we fought for."

== Post-independence Asmara (1993–present) ==
=== Post-war period ===
More than 50 years had passed since the last time Italian planners were given free rein to explore their creative drives. Almost 10 years under British occupation and another 10 years in a repressive federation with Ethiopia were followed by 30 years of bloody fighting, at the end of which the country would be free of foreign domination. Asmara remained standing, having seen little fighting within its city limits. Afterwards, however, the city was in a state of deterioration and chaos:

Scenes of boys and girls carrying barrels of water on improvised carts, military ramparts on top of apartment buildings, and bricked-up windows with broken glass and barbed wire fortifying residences facing the street are still vivid in the minds of residents of Asmara. The euphoria of victory did not remove the foul smell from clogged sewage, and the many beggar women and children indicated widespread poverty. Many colourless, decaying buildings attested to the neglect and destruction of the years of Ethiopian occupation. The basic infrastructure of Asmara was largely in need of a complete overhaul.

It was a picture with scenes of joy about the country’s newly-acquired sovereignty and, at the same time, scenes of a city’s degeneration. The fact that no intensive fighting had taken place in Asmara could not prevent the city's utter breakdown. Moreover, the already ruinous state of the city could not be overcome during the course of the war after the dismantling policy of British and Ethiopian occupation.

=== Return as political capital ===
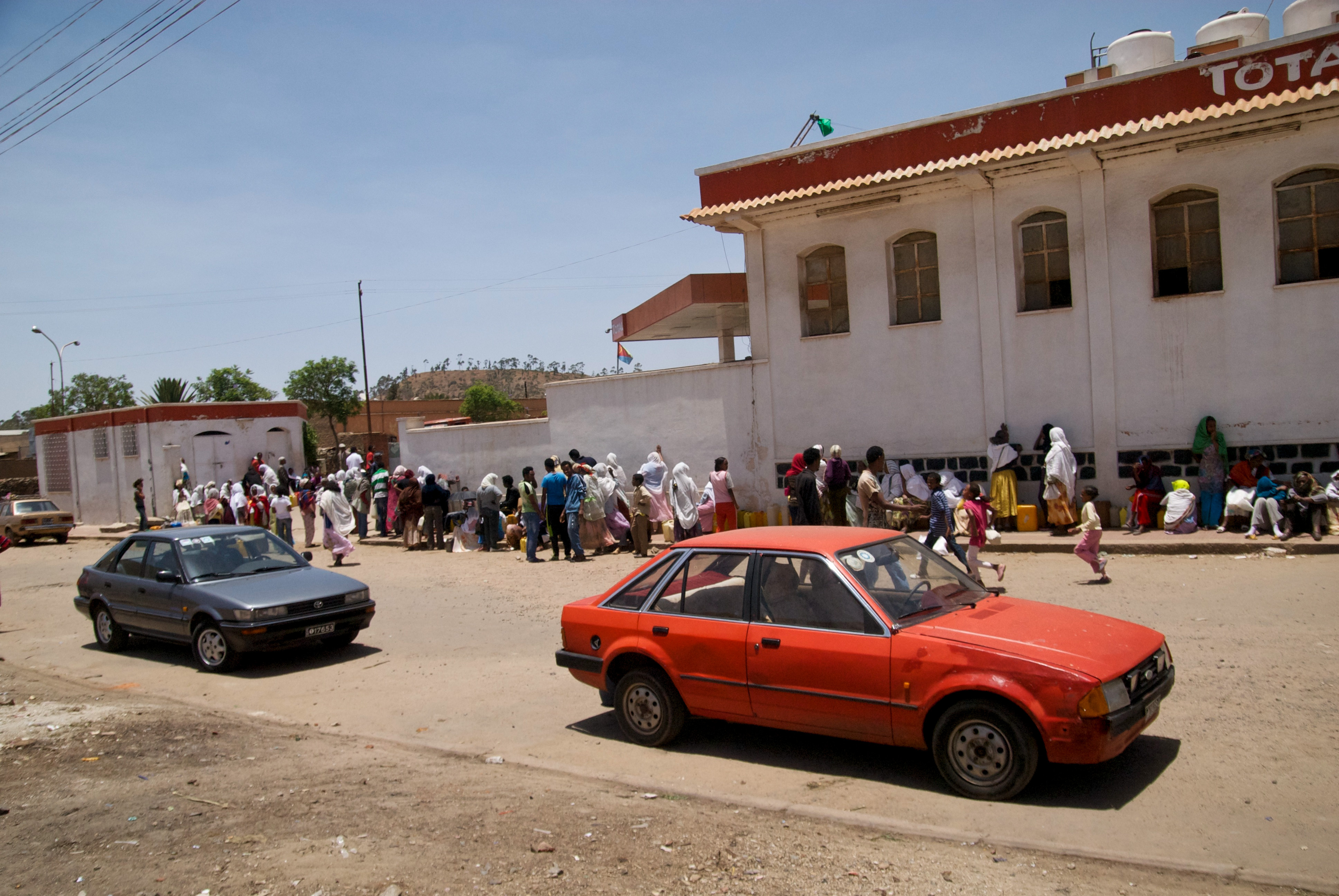
Eritreans queuing at petrol station due to rationing

The population increased due to a flood of refugees arriving from rural regions, as well as the return of many from the diaspora. Asmara, newly renamed the capital, became the political heart of Eritrea once again. During the years that followed, Eritrea experienced an economic upturn and countless investments that, together with its renewed function as the capital, led to the city's dramatic growth. While the pattern in many other African cities saw a rise in poor and illegal settlements, Asmara's development could be relatively controlled. Enormous challenges lay ahead; perhaps above all else, inhabitants of Asmara faced the problem of accessing clean drinking water, and of the lack of an adequate sewage system, as the infrastructure was still mostly in ruins following the long war.

A strong desire for self-driven development after decades of foreign rule gave rise to a debate about the colonial legacy of Asmara’s architecture. For the first time – 50 years after the end of Italian occupation – Asmara's city center was recognized as having a legacy at all. Although it could have been expected that the modern architecture left behind by the Italians would be perceived as a symbol of an imposing foreign culture, it was more often the case that people saw it as a reminder of the turbulent history of the country. Asmara's citizens fought for the preservation of the old buildings they saw as monuments, instead of trying to erase the history of foreign rule through demolition and reconstruction. Subsequently, the construction of a four-floor office building at the site of Caserma Mussolini across from the catholic cathedral was thwarted through a citizen initiative, and the barracks were spared.

=== Preservation ===
There was awareness that Asmara’s city center should be preserved, but at the same time, it needed to serve the community's economic, social and political needs. In 1997, the Eritrean government established the Cultural Assets Rehabilitation Project (CARP) under the strategic direction of the World Bank, to coordinate the preservation and rehabilitation of cultural goods, especially Asmara's architecture. Through CARP, a survey was conducted, and in 2001 an historic city center, an area of approximately 4 km^{2}, was identified and placed under protection. The hope was that this unique urban area could be protected by persuasively articulating its legacy, by proposing ways to ensure its preservation, and by paying close attention to maintaining the buildings' integrity, and thus the area would be added to the list of protected UNESCO World Heritage Sites. In the hope of making the city more accessible to tourists in the future, a map of Asmara was developed, today still the only official map of the city. In addition, the authors of the CARP independently published a book called Asmara: Africa's Secret Modernist City, which provides an overview of the development of the modern city and its buildings. The book was published in 2003, and has inspired increased worldwide interest in Asmara and its architecture, which has been satisfied quite often through exhibits meant to expand upon the book’s contents. The project failed, however, and was abandoned by the government early on.

Owing to an unexpected political shift, Eritrea is now slipping deeper and deeper into a dictatorial and patriarchal state system, in the center of which is President Isayas Afewerki, surrounded by other autocratic leaders with vested interests in holding onto power. Although the first steps towards democratization were made in the mid-1990s, including economic reforms and the formulation of a constitution, today it seems as if all of this had been done in order to legitimize the actions of the political elite. Bereket Habte Selassie, a former member of the Eritrean Constitutional Committee, has also criticized this abrupt change in the trajectory of Eritrea’s politics: "It seems to me [that] the rule of law has gone to the dogs in Eritrea. There was a very good beginning, a very promising beginning. We all hailed Isaias [sic] Afewerki and his colleagues in creating an enabling environment to lead to democracy and we were waiting for that when he and his group – in my view – hijacked the constitution." Eritrea still does not have a viable constitution.

Since the border war of 1998-2000 with Ethiopia, Eritrea has been in an official state of emergency, its citizens effectively living under Martial Law. The political elites’ control of the nation has far-reaching consequences, such as the repudiation of freedom of speech, of assembly, and of the press. The Washington Post published an article saying, "While striving to be an egalitarian, self-reliant utopia, Eritrea has become the most unapologetically repressive country on earth." The population is faced with a steady political and cultural indoctrination, relying upon the rhetoric of nationalism and devoted to the idea of its superiority over Ethiopia. A state-controlled economy encompassing agriculture, industry, and construction is heavily dependent on the recruitment of conscripts who serve in national service, often for life.

=== Financial support for the urban historic core ===
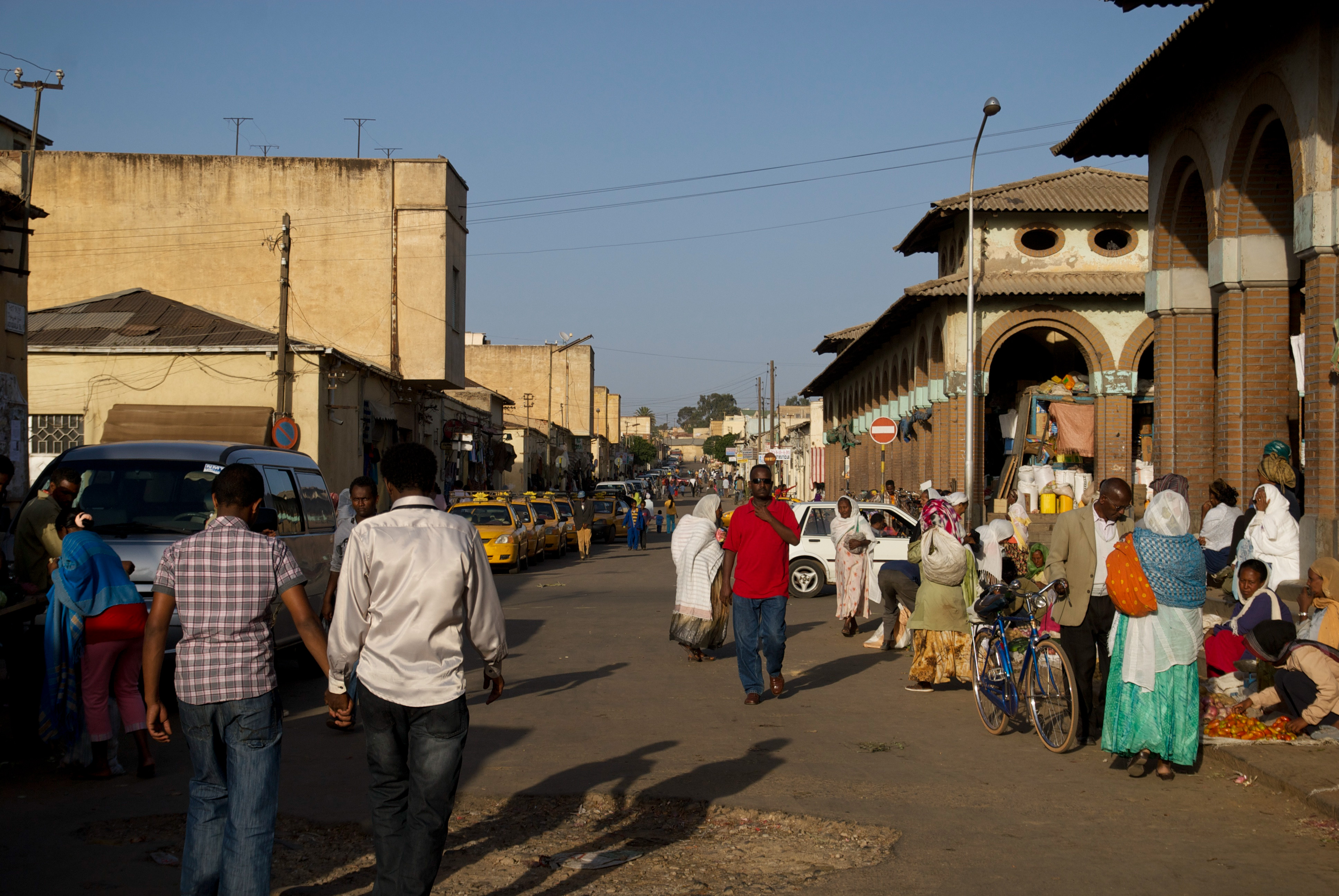
Asmara's market (2013)

In addition, Afewerki has introduced a strict policy of self-sufficiency. Under the pretext that Eritrea has historically refused to fall victim to the strategic desires of other nations, an idea that is not totally unfounded, Afewerki rejects any kind of help from abroad. In 2007 alone, the President turned down 200 million dollars meant to aide in the country’s relief efforts. This has fatal consequences when it comes to caring for Asmara’s heritage, something one of the poorest nations in the world cannot do alone. As mentioned above, the CARP, with its $5 million budget allotted by the World Bank, was abandoned. Another project with the purpose of renewing Asmara’s city center, this time sponsored by the European Union, together with other EU aid programs were accounted for in 2011. Other programs aimed at preserving Asmara’s city center are not on the table at the moment, and it is difficult to imagine that Afewerki will bypass his tendency toward isolationism and accept the necessary financial and technical assistance from abroad that could revive such programs.

In 2017, the historical core of Asmara was designated by UNESCO as a World Heritage Site.

== See also ==
- Timeline of Asmara
- History of Eritrea

== Bibliography ==
- Abbay, A. (2000): Identity Jilted or Re-Imagining Identity: The Divergent Paths of the Eritrean & Tigrayan Nationalist Struggles. Trenton: The Red Sea Press, Inc.
- Abraham, Y. (2010): The Garden City Asmara. National Union of Eritrean Youth and Students (Accessed: 20.10.12).
- Almedom, A. (2006): Re-reading the Short and Long-Rigged History of Eritrea 1941-1952: Back to the Future?. Tufts University, Nordic Journal of African Studies, Ausgabe 15(2).
- Appel, S. (2009). Eritrea: Die schöne Eritreerin.
- Bader, S. (2009): Faschistische Moderne in Afrika: Auto und Architektur in Asmara. In: Mattioli, A. / Steinacher, G. Für den Faschismus bauen: Architektur und Städtebau im Italien Mussolinis. Zürich: Orell Füssli Verlag.
- Berhane, D. (2011): A Week in the Horn of Africa
- Bizzoni, A. (1897): L’Eritrea: Nel passato e nel presente. Milan: Societa Editrice Sonzogno.
- Bodenschatz, H. et al. (2011): Städtebau für Mussolini: Auf der Suche nach der neuen Stadt im faschistischen Italien. Berlin: DOM Publishers.
- Boneß, S. / Visscher, J. (2007): Asmara – The Frozen City. Berlin: Jovis Verlag.
- Chelati Dirar, U. (2004): From warriors to urban dwellers: Ascari and the military factor in the urban development of colonial Eritrea. In: Cahiers d'Études Africaines, Ausgabe 44(175).
- Cogliati, L.F. (1901): Tre anni in Eritrea. Milan: Cogliati.
- Denison, E. (2007): Eritrea. Bucks: Jovis Verlag
- Denison, E. / Gebremedhin N. / Guang, Y. (2006): Asmara – Africa's Secret Modernist City. London: Merrell Publishers.
- Donnell, D. / Killion, T. (1998): Historical Dictionary of Eritrea. Plymouth: Scarecrow Press, Inc.
- Fattovich, R. (1988). Remarks on the Late Prehistory and Early History of Northern Ethiopia. In: Tadesse Beyene, Proceedings of the VIII International Conference of Ethiopian Studies. Addis Abeba.
- Fuller, M. (2011): Italy's Colonial Futures: Colonial Inertia and Postcolonial Capital in Asmara. Berkeley: California Italian Studies Journal, Edition 2(1).
- Galli Della Loggia, E. (2009): Der Marsch auf Rom. Berlin: Lettre International, Edition 85.
- Gebre-Medhin, J. (1998): Peasants and Nationalism in Eritrea: A Critique of Ethiopian Studies. Trenton: The Red Sea Press, Inc.
- Gebremedhin, N. (2007): Asmara - Africa’s Secret Modernist City. African Perspectives: Dialogue on Urbanism and Architecture. Delft: The Faculty of Architecture, TU Delft.
- Habte Selassie, B. (1989): Eritrea and the United Nations and other Essays. Trenton: The Red Sea Press, Inc.
- Habtemichael, S. (2010): The Asmara Cathedral: An Architectural Wonder. Shabait, Ministry of Information, Eritrea: (letzter Zugriff: 20.10.12).
- Iyob, R. (1997): The Eritrean Struggle for Independence, 1941-1993: Cambridge: Cambridge University Press.
- Körting, J. / Zölzer, N. (2012): Heritage and Daily Life in the Historic Urban Core of Asmara (Original: Erbe und Alltag im historischen Stadtkern Asmaras) (Dissertation). Technische Universität Berlin.
- Ledauphin, R. (o.J.): United Nations Commission for Eritrea 1934-1957. United Nations - File AG-048.
- Mattioli, A. (2009): Unterwegs zu einer imperialen Raumordnung in Italienisch-Ostafrika. In: Mattioli, A. / Steinacher, G. Für den Faschismus bauen: Architektur und Städtebau im Italien Mussolinis. Zürich: Orell Füssli Verlag.
- McCrummen, S. (2009): As thousands flee regime, Eritrea would go it alone. Washington Post (Published on 14.12.2009).
- Melchers, K. et al. (2007): Asmara: Afrikas heimliche Hauptstadt der Moderne. Frankfurt/Main: Verein zur Förderung der entwicklungspolitischen Publizistik e.V. (Publisher).
- Meye, F. (2006). Einzigartiges. Die Tageszeitung (Published on 10.10.2006).
- Miran, J. (2005). A historical Overview of Islam in Eritrea. In: Die Welt des Islams, Edition 45(2).
- Munro-Hay, S. (1991): Aksum: An African Civilisation of Late Antiquity. Edinburgh: Edinburgh University Press.
- Negash, T. (1997): Eritrea and Ethiopia: The Federal Experience. Piscataway: Transaction Publishers.
- Ogbazghi, P. (2011): Personal Rule in Africa: The Case of Eritrea. In: African Studies Quarterly, Edition 12.
- Pankhurst, R. (1968): Economic History of Ethiopia: 1800-1935. Addis Ababa: Addis Ababa University.
- Rausch, C.: Rescuing Modernity: Global Heritage Assemblages and Modern Architecture in Africa (PhD Dissertation): Delft University of Technology / Maastricht University.
- Rodwell, D. (2004): Asmara: Conservation and Development in a Historic City. In: Journal of Architectural Conservation. Dorset: Donhead Publishing.
- Sanders, E. (2007): Struggling Eritrea puts Self-Reliance Before Aid. Los Angeles Times (Veröffentlicht am 2.10.2007).
- Santoianni, V. (2008): Il Razionalismo nelle colonie italiane 1928-1943. La „nuova architettura“ delle Terre d`Oltremare, (Dissertation). Neapel.
- Schmidt, P. / Curtis, C. (2001). Urban Precursors in the Horn: Early 1st Millennium BC Communities in Eritrea. In: Antiquity Journal, Issue 75.
- Schneider, G. (2000): Mussolini in Afrika. Köln: Sh Verlag.
- Schrott, M. (2009): Asmara: Italienische Stadt in Afrika. ORF (Accessed 20.10.12).
- Schwartz, C. (2006). Bilderbuch der Moderne. Neue Züricher Zeitung (Published on 11.10.2006).
- Tesfagiorgis, M. (2010): Eritrea: Africa in Focus. Santa Barbara: ABC Clio Verlag.
- Tesfai, A. (1998): The Cause of the Eritrean-Ethiopian Border Conflict (Accessed 20.10.12).
- Trevaskis, G. K. N. (1960): Eritrea: A Colony in Transition: 1941-52. Oxford: Oxford University Press.
- Unknown (1938): Guida dell’Africa Orientale Italiana. Milano: Consociazione Turistica Italiana.
- Welzbacher, C. (2006). Asmara-Ausstellung scheut die Analyse. Frankfurt: Frankfurter Allgemeine Zeitung (Published on 17.11.2006).
- Woller, H. (2010): Geschichte Italiens im 20. Jahrhundert. München: C. H. Beck Verlag.
- Yared, Y.: Resistance of our people living under the enemy. Shabait, Ministry of Information, Eritrea (Accessed 20.10.12).
