= Timeline of Asmara =

Chronological aspect of Asmara, the capital of Eritrea

The following is a timeline of the history of the city of Asmara, Eritrea. Asmara was under Italian colonial rule from 1889 until 1941.

== Prior to 20th century ==
- circa 1515 CE – Four villages merge to become "Asmera" (traditional date).
- 16th century – Asmara sacked by Muslim forces.
- 1889 – 3 August: Asmara occupied by Italian forces under command of Baldissera.
- 1895 – Governor's Palace built.
- 1900 – Capital of colonial Italian Eritrea moved to Asmara from Massawa.

== 20th century ==
- 1905 – Congresso Coloniale Italiano held in Asmara.
- 1906 – Asmara Synagogue built.
- 1911 – Ferrovia Massaua-Asmara begins operating; Asmara Station opens.
- 1920
  - Teatro Asmara (theatre) opens.
  - Population: 14,711.
- 1922 – Airport begins operating.
- 1923 – Church of Our Lady of the Rosary built.
- 1930s – New Governor's Palace built (now City Hall).
- 1935 – Population: 16,000 (12,000 Africans + 4,000 Italians).
- 1936 – Apartheid begins; city racially divided into nazionali (white) and indigeni (black) areas.
- 1937
  - Asmara-Massawa Cableway begins operating.
  - Albergo CIAAO (hotel) built for the Compagnia Immobiliare Alberghi Africa Orientale.
  - Cinema Excelsior and Cinema Teatro Augustus open.
- 1938
  - Great Mosque of Asmara, Cicero Stadium, and Fiat Tagliero Building constructed.
  - Cinema Impero opens.
- 1939
  - Asmara Brewery in business.
  - Population: 84,000 (36,000 Africans + 48,000 Italians).
- 1941
  - March. British occupy city.
  - Asmara Brewery FC (football club) formed.
- 1945 – Red Sea FC (football club) formed.
- 1951 – British occupation ends.
- 1952 – City becomes part of Ethiopia per United Nations decision.
- 1953 – United States military signals intelligence Kagnew Station in operation.
- 1957 – Scuola materna italiana di Asmara (school) active.
- 1958
  - Catholic College of the Santa Famiglia founded.
  - Denden Stadium opens.
- 1959 – Catholic Apostolic Vicariate of Asmara active.
- 1962 – Population: 120,000.
- 1964 – Population: 131,800.
- 1968
  - January: Part of 1968 African Cup of Nations football contest held in Asmara.
  - University of Asmara active.
- 1969 – Kidane Mehret Cathedral built.
- 1974
  - Coordinating Committee of the Armed Forces, Police, and Territorial Army (Derg) in power.
  - 28 December: Massacre occurs during the Eritrean War of Independence.
- 1975
  - February: Fighting, Massacre occurs.
  - July: Fighting occurs.
- 1985 – Population: 284,748 (estimate).
- 1990
  - Siege of city begins.
  - Population: 358,100 (estimate).
- 1991
  - 24 May: Eritrean People's Liberation Front take city; Derg rule ends.
  - Haddas Ertra newspaper begins publication.
- 1993
  - 24 May: Asmara becomes capital of independent Eritrea.
  - Eri-TV begins broadcasting.
- 1998 – 5 June: Airport bombed by Ethiopian forces during the Eritrean–Ethiopian War.

== 21st century ==
- 2002 – Semere Russom becomes mayor of Asmara and administrator of the Central Region.
- 2013 – 21 January: 2013 Eritrean Army mutiny occurs at Eri-TV building.
- 2017 – Italian city centre designated an UNESCO World Heritage Site.
- 2018 – Population: 501,203 (estimate).
- 2020 – Rocket attacks.

== See also ==
- Asmara history
- Asmara under Italy, 1889-1941
- Timeline of the Italian Empire

== Bibliography ==
- "Asmara" . Encyclopædia Britannica. Vol. 2 (11th ed.). 1910. p. 763.
- "Asmara", Enciclopedia Italiana (Treccani) (in Italian), 1929
- Redie Bereketeab (2003). "Asmara, Eritrea". In Paul Tiyambe Zeleza; Dickson Eyoh (eds.). Encyclopedia of Twentieth-Century African History. Routledge. ISBN 0415234794.
- Karin Caesar; Katarina Rosengren (2003). Analysis of the Situation for Cyclists in Asmara (PDF) (MA). Sweden: Lund University.
- David P. Johnson, Jr. (2005). "Asmara, Eritrea". In Kwame Anthony Appiah; Henry Louis Gates (eds.). Africana: The Encyclopedia of the African and African American Experience (2nd ed.). Oxford University Press. p. 278+. ISBN 978-0-19-517055-9.
- Marie Bridonneau (2006). "Kushet, un village périurbain de l'agglomération d'Asmara: politique d'aménagement et recomposition spatiale". Chroniques yéménites (in French). 13 (13). doi:10.4000/cy.1384 – via Revues.org.
- Edward Denison; et al. (2007) [2003]. Asmara: Africa's Secret Modernist City. Merrell. ISBN 9781858943824.
- Eritrea: National and Cities Urban Profile: Asmara, Massawa & Mendefera. United Nations Human Settlements Programme. 2008.
- Belula Tecle-Misghina (2014). Asmara, an urban history. Rome: Edizioni Nuova Cultura. ISBN 978-88-6812-354-3.
- Gian Luca Podestà (2015). "Asmara and Dek'emhare: Cities of Work, Cities of Leisure". Diacronie (21). doi:10.4000/diacronie.1919 – via Revues.org. ISSN 2038-0925.
- Sean Anderson (2016). "Asmara". Modern Architecture and Its Representation in Colonial Eritrea: An In-visible Colony, 1890-1941. Routledge. pp. 69–146. ISBN 978-1-317-09478-4.
- Asmara Heritage Project (2016), Asmara: Africa's Modernist City, Eritrea: Central Region Administration, "Nomination Dossier for UNESCO World Heritage Listing"
