= Lothar Wolleh =

German photographer (1930–1979)

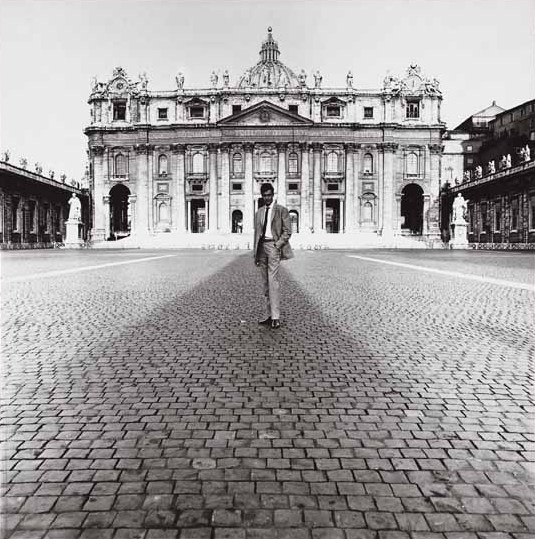
- Self-portrait in front of St. Peter's Basilica, 1964
- Born: January 20, 1930; Germany
- Died: September 28, 1979 (aged 49)
- Occupation: Photographer
- Known for: Commercial photographer

Lothar Wolleh (January 20, 1930 – September 28, 1979) was a well-known German photographer.

Until the end of the sixties, Lothar Wolleh worked as a commercial photographer. He made portraits of international contemporary painters, sculptors and performance artists. Altogether, he photographed around 109 artists, including known personalities such as Georg Baselitz, Joseph Beuys, Dieter Roth, Jean Tinguely, René Magritte and his wife Georgette, Günther Uecker, Gerhard Richter, Edward Kienholz, Otto Piene, Niki de Saint Phalle, and Christo.

== Life ==
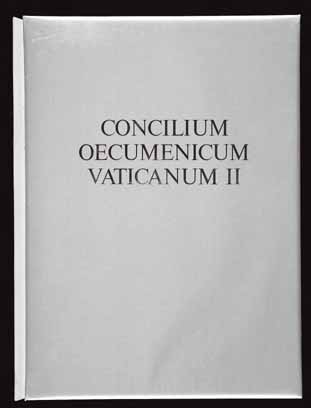
Cover : Lothar Wolleh, Das Konzil, II Vatikanisches Konzil (The Council, Vatican II Ecumenical Council), Stuttgart 1965

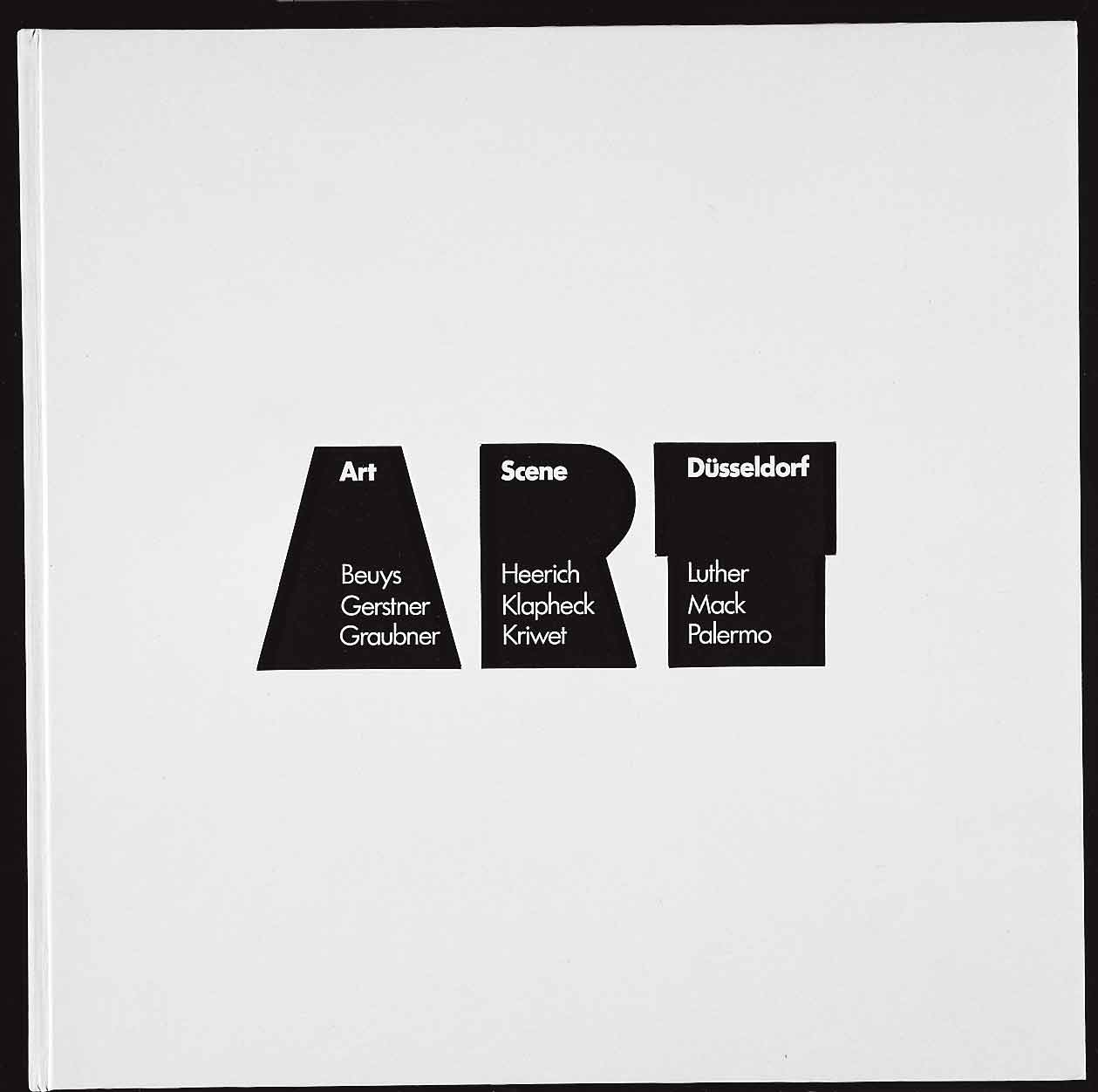
Cover of Art Scene Düsseldorf. Lothar Wolleh, Stuttgart 1972

Lothar Wolleh was born in Berlin-Wedding, the first of four sons of the unmarried worker Else Martha Wolleh. He spent the World War II years in Berlin, suffering the heavy Allied bombing campaign that finished the long struggle. The death of his uncle's family as well as his participation "in the last squad" during the final battle for Berlin in April and May 1945 left deep psychological scars. In the grim, post-war years from 1946 to 1947, he studied "concrete painting" in the elementary school class at the Hochschule für angewandte Kunst ("University of applied arts") in Berlin-Weißensee.

From December 1947 to October 1949, he lived in “Boys Town” in Bad Vilbel, in a camp run by the US Army for uprooted young Germans, based on the model of Father Edward J. Flanagan. A few months after his return to Berlin in July 1950, he was arrested by the Soviet occupying forces and sentenced by a special court "OSO" (remote judgement from Moscow) to 15 years in a forced labor camp, for alleged espionage and diversion under Articles 58.6 and 58.9 of the USSR.

For the next six years, Wolleh was confined in the GULAG labor camp Vorkutlag in the USSR, where he did forced labor in a coal mine. Wolleh was able to return to Berlin in 1956, after Konrad Adenauer's successful negotiations for the return of German prisoners of war. Torture after his arrest, and the long hard detention and working conditions in coal mining, left behind physical damage and post-traumatic disorders. However, the GULAG labor camp Vorkutlag allowed Wolleh's first contact with photography and his mythical worship of light.

After his return from exile, from 1956 to 1957 Wolleh resumed his education in the Lette-Verein, a continuation school for photography, design, and fashion in Berlin. He took part in a regular monthly recovery program of the World Council of Churches for war-damaged youth. This program made it possible for him to visit the Swedish island of Gotland in 1958, which was an inspiration for his lifelong strong affinity towards Sweden, its culture, landscape, and people.

From 1962 until his death he lived and worked in Düsseldorf as a freelance photographer. Initially, he worked primarily in advertising, but later focused on his artistic work. In 1964 he married his wife Karin. His son Oliver was born in 1965, and his daughter Anouchka in 1966.

In 1979 Lothar Wolleh died after an asthma attack in London, shortly after he had photographed Henry Moore. His grave is on Gotland in Sweden.

== Work ==
As a freelancer for the advertising agency TEAM, which also included Helmut Newton, Wolleh became one of the most famous and expensive fashion, advertising, and portrait photographers in the Federal Republic of Germany during the 1960s. His clients included well-known companies such as the Deutsche Bundesbahn, Tchibo or Volkswagen. In 1965 he portrayed Chancellor Ludwig Erhard in his campaign for the general election.

In the years 1962 to 1965, Wolleh photographed the ground-breaking Second Vatican Council in Rome. With the help of Father Emil Schmitz SJ, Wolleh's first photo book Das Konzil, II Vatikanisches Konzil was published in 1965 by Belser. In 1975, he photographed the Jubilee celebration, and published the photographic folio Apostolorum Limina. This work, with its blurring, represented a radical evolution of Wolleh´s color photography, as hinted by his first book.

In 1969, Wolleh traveled for several months through the Soviet Union. The photographs taken on this journey found their way into the 1970 illustrated book USSR – The Soviet State and its People, which he published together with Heinrich Böll and Valentin Katajew with Belser publisher.

In the early 1960s, at the request of his friend the German painter Günther Uecker, Wolleh began to systematically portray more than one hundred sixty international well-known painters, sculptors, and Actionists. From the 1970s, Wolleh did relatively little work as a commercial photographer, devoting himself almost exclusively to his series of artist portraits, in which he initially photographed the well-known artists of the Düsseldorf scene, including Heinz Mack, Otto Piene, Joseph Beuys, and Gerhard Richter. Soon however, his project expanded beyond the borders of the Rhineland to the whole of Europe, focusing on the Zero group, and Nouveau Réalisme, with members such as Niki de Saint Phalle and Jean Tinguely.

From 1963 onwards, Wolleh developed the concept of the photographic art portfolio as an independent artistic publishing format. The first edition of this kind was produced in 1966/67 in collaboration with Lucio Fontana. Limited to 15 copies, the edition combined Wolleh’s photographs with multiples created by Fontana. In 1970/71, the volume Uecker was published by Edition Artifex in an edition of 530 copies. In 1978, the portfolio Zum Zeichen der Schrift oder die Sprachlosigkeit was produced, featuring photographs by Lothar Wolleh that were partially overpainted by Uecker. These overpainted photographs subsequently served as source material for the editioned work of the same title, published in 1979. In 1972, the photo book Art Scene Düsseldorf was published, accompanied by multiples by the participating artists.

Wolleh documented numerous actions by Günther Uecker, including the video film Schwarzraum–Weißraum based on Uecker’s action of the same name. He also photographed actions by Allan Kaprow and Joseph Beuys’s action Filz-TV, which was recorded on film and video by Gerry Schum

Out of this project several comprehensive photobook-projects evolved:

- 1970– UdSSR (USSR)
- 1972– Art Scene Düsseldorf
- 1972– Apostolorum Limina
- 1973– Das Unterwasserbuch (The Underwater Book, together with Joseph Beuys)

Several book and art portfolio projects remained unfinished, including a volume on Jan Schoonhoven and Art Scene Düsseldorf No. 2, featuring works on Gerhard Richter, Dieter Roth, Stefan Wewerka, and Klaus Rinke, as well as a documentation of the Nouveau Réalisme group's 1970 "Funeral Banquet" (Trauerbankett) in Milan marking its dissolution. The illustrated book "Men of Management", in which company founders and managers of the leading German companies were portrayed, was not to be released because of feared attacks by the Red Army faction. Another project was Das Unterwasserbuch, which Beuys and Wolleh had planned together; he created 51 format-filling pictures for the book. The photographs were taken during the construction of the Beuys exhibition at the Moderna Museet in Stockholm in 1971.

In his final years between 1977 and 1979, Wolleh had several stays in Poland. At his death, the unfinished photo volumes The Black Madonna of Czestochowa and Wawel Castle were still underway.

== Legacy ==
Wolleh's photograph of René Magritte and his wife is said to have inspired singer-songwriter Paul Simon to compose the ballad "Rene And Georgette Magritte With Their Dog After The War".

In his work, Lothar Wolleh pursued idiosyncratic creative principles that gave his portraits an unmistakable signature. His works are precisely designed and staged through a clear, often strictly symmetrical image structure. The portrayed persons are usually placed as a whole figure on the vertical central axis in the upper half of the picture. Often the camera is on the ground or near the ground, so that the foreground occupies almost the entire lower half of the picture, establishing a base with a clear horizon line dividing the image area. Characteristicly, he used black and white photography, in the context of a basically square format. In total, Lothar Wolleh is known to have portrayed 160 artists.

== Estate and Reception ==
After his early death, Lothar Wolleh’s oeuvre initially receded from public attention. His son, Oliver Wolleh, undertook the systematic cataloguing, organization, and scholarly processing of the photographic estate. Since the 2000s, exhibitions and publications have been initiated; in 2005, the Kunsthalle Bremen presented the first comprehensive solo exhibition.Lothar Wolleh – Eine Wiederentdeckung: Fotografien 1959 bis 1979 (Lothar Wolleh – A Rediscovery: Photographs 1959 to 1979) was shown in Germany at Kunsthalle Bremen, Stadtmuseum Hofheim, Kunstmuseum Ahlen, and the Deutschherrenhaus Koblenz.

With the establishment of the Lothar Wolleh Raum, a permanent venue for presentation, research, and archival work was created. In addition to the conservation of the holdings, its activities include the digital documentation and contextualization of the oeuvre, as well as its international dissemination through exhibitions, events, and publications.Lothar Wolleh Estate is a member of the "Deutsche Fotorat" (German Council of Photography). Furthermore, collaborations exist with foundations and the estates of the portrayed artists.

== Selected exhibitions ==
- 1962: Otto Steinert und Schüler. Fotografische Ausstellung, Gruppenausstellung in der Göppinger Galerie, Frankfurt/Main
- 1964: Farbige Fotografie. Bilder aus dem Vatikan, Einzelausstellung: Schatzkammer des Essener Münsters. Die Ausstellung wurde vom Essener Bischof Hengsbach (am 21. März 1964) eröffnet
- 1965: Zyklus von Farbfotos zum römischen Konzil, Einzelausstellung in der Galerie Valentin, Stuttgart
- 1980: Lothar Wolleh: Künstlerbildnisse. Kunstobjekte, Photographien, Einzelausstellung der Künstlerporträts in der Städtischen Kunsthalle Düsseldorf
- 1986: Lothar Wolleh – Das Foto als Kunststück Einzelausstellung der Lippischen Gesellschaft für Kunst e.V. im Detmolder Schloß
- 1995: "Lothar Wolleh 1930–1979: Künstlerbildnisse – Kunstobjekte, Photographien“ Kunstmuseum Ahlen
- 2005–2007: Lothar Wolleh. Eine Wiederentdeckung: Fotografien 1959 bis 1979, Einzelausstellung: Kunsthalle Bremen, Ludwig Museum Koblenz, Kunst-Museum Ahlen, Stadtmuseum Hofheim am Taunus
- 2006: Joseph Beuys in Aktion. Heilkräfte der Kunst – Gruppenausstellung: museum kunst palast, Düsseldorf
- 2008: Fotos schreiben Kunstgeschichte – Gruppenausstellung: museum kunst palast, Düsseldorf
- 2008: Staatliche Museen zu Berlin, Kunstbibliothek, Unsterblich! Das Foto des Künstlers
- 2008: Lothar Wolleh: Künstlerportraits Galerie f5,6, München
- 2009: „Lothar Wolleh: Portraits d'artistes“ Goethe-Institut Paris
- 2012: "Lothar Wolleh: Joseph Beuys im Moderna Museet, Stockholm, Januar 1971", Ausstellung im Hamburger Bahnhof Museum für Gegenwart, Berlin
- 2012: “Das Kozil – Fotografien von Lothar Wolleh, Berlin” Bonifatiushaus Fulda
- 2013: “Lothar Wolleh (1930–1979) Das Zweite Vatikanische Konzil im Bild Fotografien” Franz Hitze Haus, Münster
- 2014: Lothar Wolleh Künstlerportraits der sechziger und siebziger Jahre, Kunstmuseum Magdeburg
- 2015: Lothar Wolleh – Die ZERO–Künstler, Galerie Pavlov’s Dog, Berlin
- 2015: Lothar Wolleh – Vaticanum II, Galerie f5,6, München
- 2017: Lothar Wolleh – Portraits international bekannter Künstler, Galerie Ruth Leuchter, Düsseldorf
- 2018: „Lothar Wolleh – Bernd Jansen Künstlerportraits“, Hermann Harry Schmitz Institut, Düsseldorf
- 2019: „Lothar Wolleh Raum 1 – Menschen, Farben, Licht“, Lothar Wolleh Raum, Berlin
- 2020: „Subjekt und Objekt. Foto Rhein Ruhr“, Kunsthalle Düsseldorf
- 2020: „Lothar Wolleh Raum 2 – Jenseits der Gegen¬ständlichkeit“, Lothar Wolleh Raum, Berlin
- 2020: „The Sky as a Studio. Yves Klein and his Contemporaries“, Centre Pompidou-Metz
- 2020: „Lothar Wolleh Raum 3 – Atmosphären der Phantasie“, Lothar Wolleh Raum, Berlin
- 2020: „TRUTH/REALITY“, Coppejans Gallery, Antwerpen
- 2021: „Joseph Beuys. Der Raumkurator, mit Arbeiten von Lothar Wolleh, Staatsgalerie, Stuttgart
- 2021: „Der Erfinder der Elektrizität. Joseph Beuys und der Christusimpuls. Mit einer Dokumentation von Lothar Wolleh, St. Matthäus-Kirche, Berlin
- 2021: „"Wer nicht denken will fliegt raus.", Coppejans Gallery, Antwerpen
- 2021: „Lothar Wolleh: Intuition! Interaction!“, Museum für Zeitgenössische Kunst Antwerpen (M HKA)
- 2021: „Sankt Peter in Sankt Peter – Die Rombilder von Lothar Wolleh, Kunst-Station Sankt Peter, Köln
- 2021: „Joseph Beuys – Lothar Wolleh: das Unterwasserbuch-Projekt“, Lothar Wolleh Raum, Berlin
- 2021: „Westblick – Ostblick | Künstlerporträts von Lothar Wolleh und Lenke Szilágyi, Collegium Hungaricum, Berlin
- 2021: „Kriwet – ein Dichter aus Düsseldorf, Heinrich-Heine-Institut, Düsseldorf
- 2021: „NOTHINGTOSEENESS void/white/silence“, Akademie der Künste, Berlin
- 2021: „Beat the System!“, Ludwig Forum Aachen
- 2021: „Beuys & Duchamp Artists of the Future”, Kaiser Wilhelm Museum, Krefeld
- 2021: „Lothar Wolleh: Joseph Beuys – Vom Moderna Museet zum Unterwasserbuch-Projekt“, Goethe-Institut, Stockholm
- 2021: „Warum denn in die Ferne ..." oder "In 18 Büchern um die Welt", Esslinger Kunstverein e.V.
- 2021: „Joseph Beuys: Antecedent, Coincidences and Influences”, Museum of Contemporary Art Helga de Alvear, Cáceres
- 2022: „Lothar Wolleh Raum 5 – Im Focus Günther Uecker“, Lothar Wolleh Raum, Berlin
- 2022: „The Timeless Imagination of Yves Klein: Uncertainty and the Immateriality“, Museum of Contemporary Art, Kanazawa, Japan
- 2022: „Lothar Wolleh Duo – Künstler:innen-Interventions“, Lothar Wolleh Raum, Berlin
- 2022: „Lucio Fontana: Recto-Verso“, Centra Pompidou Málaga
- 2023: „PHOTO/MEDIA ART FAIR contemporary art ruhr (C.A.R.)“, UNESCO-Welterbe Zollverein, Essen
- 2023: „René Magritte. Die letzten Porträts“, Lothar Wolleh Raum, Berlin
- 2023: „Mysthik des Lichtes“, Die Wolfsburg, Mülheim a.d.Ruhr
- 2023: „Ein Kleid, monochrom. ZERO und Mode “, ZERO Foundation, Düsseldorf
- 2023: „Schatten aus Licht. Lothar Wolleh und Alexander Camaro“, Alexander & Renata Camaro Stiftung, Berlin
- 2023: „Lothar Wolleh sieht Jan Schoonhoven: Die Verführung von Rhythmus und Licht“, Museum Prinsenhof Delft, Niederlande
- 2023: „Joseph Beuys – Ohne Wasser geht´s nicht“, Kulturkirche St. Stephani, Bremen
- 2024: „Licht – Bild – Skulptur“, Bernhard-Heiliger-Stiftung, Berlin
- 2024: „Jan Schoonhoven & Lothar Wolleh: Blick auf Delft“, Lothar Wolleh Raum, Berlin
- 2024: „The Spirit of“, Lothar Wolleh Raum, Berlin
- 2024: „Socle du Monde Art Festival 2024 – A realist view on the Realists “, HEART – Herning Museum of Contemporary Art, Herning
- 2024: „Mythos Schlaf“, HEART – Kunsthal KAdE, Amersfoort, Niederlande
- 2024: „Lucio Fontana Erwartung“, Von der Heydt-Museum, Wuppertal
- 2024: „Die Noveaux Réalistes durch Wollehs Linse“, Lothar Wolleh Raum, Berlin
- 2025: „Der Feind und seine Menschen. Portraits aus der Sowjetunion“, Lothar Wolleh Raum, Berlin
- 2026: Lothar Wolleh & Lucio Fontana – Dialogue with the „Grande Maestro”

== Public collections ==
- Kunsthalle Bremen
- Kunst-Museum Ahlen
- Museum Folkwang, Essen
- Museum Kunst Palast, Düsseldorf
- Tate Gallery / National Gallery of Scotland
- Muzeum Sztuki in Łódź, Łódź

== Gallery ==
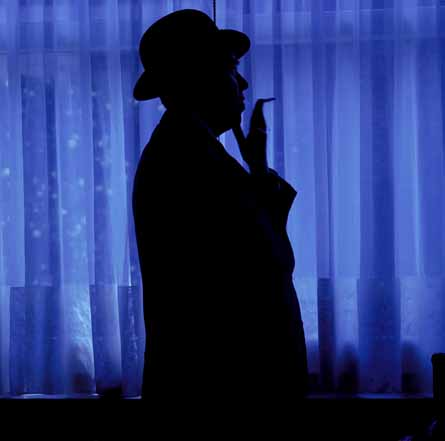
René Magritte

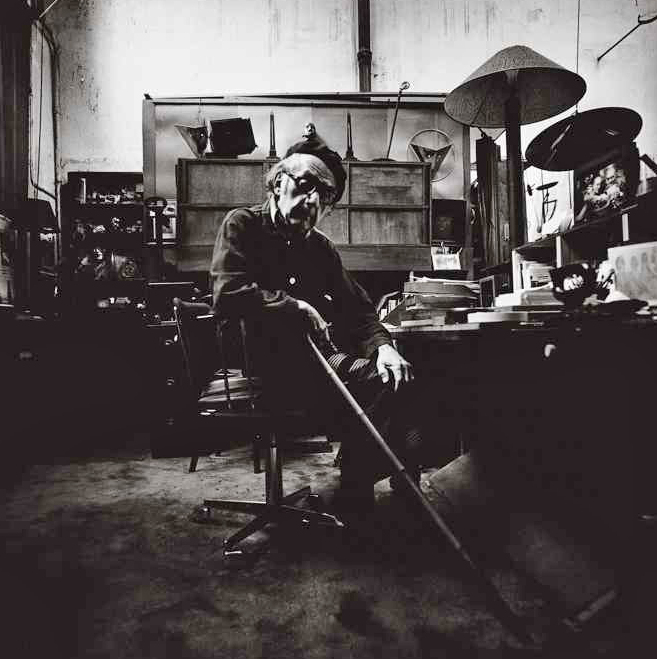
Man Ray

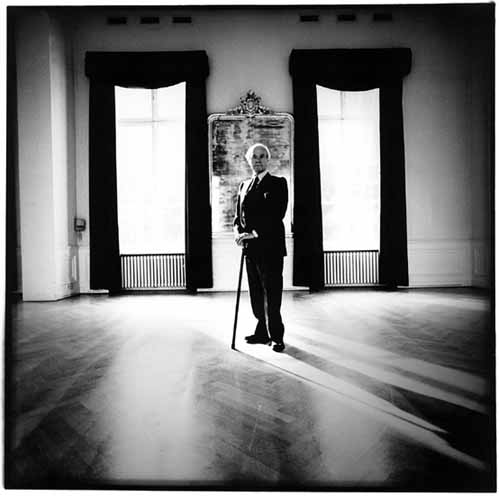
Henry Moore

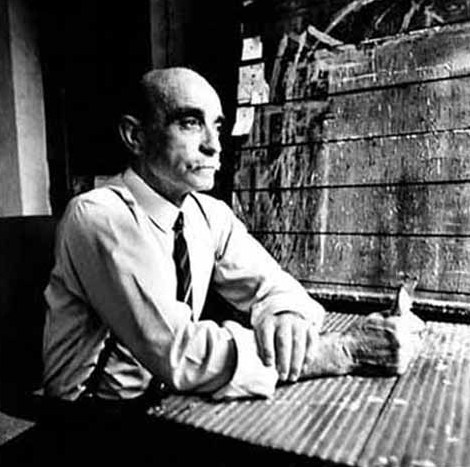
Lucio Fontana

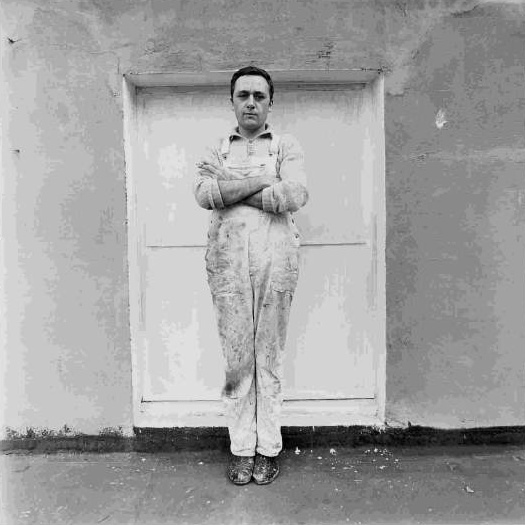
Gerhard Richter

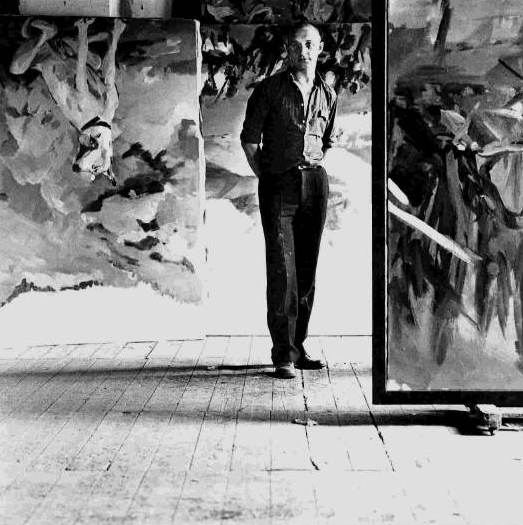
Georg Baselitz

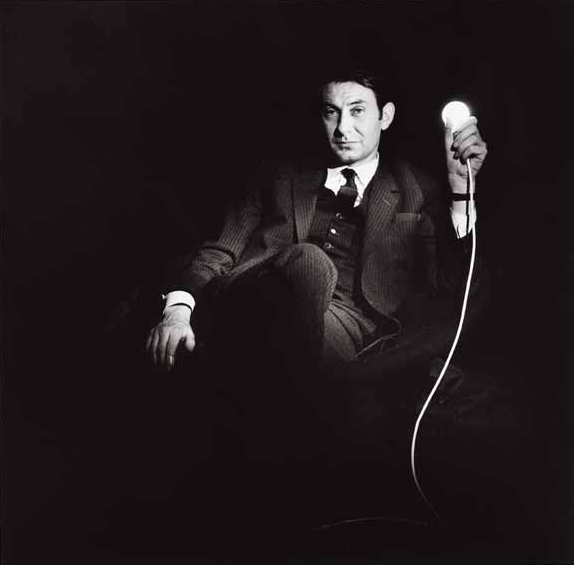
Otto Piene

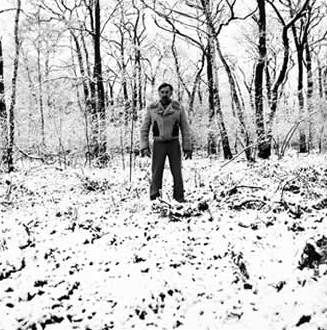
Herbert Zangs

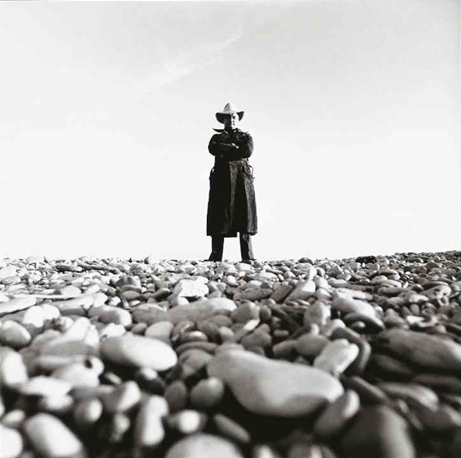
Armand Pierre Fernandez

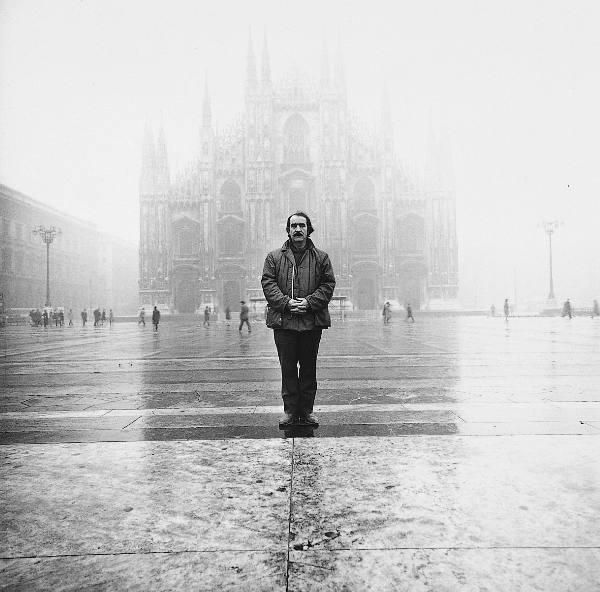
Jean Tinguely

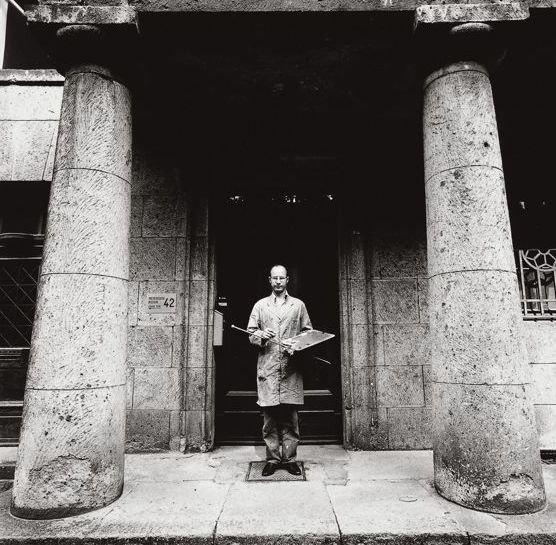
Konrad Klapheck

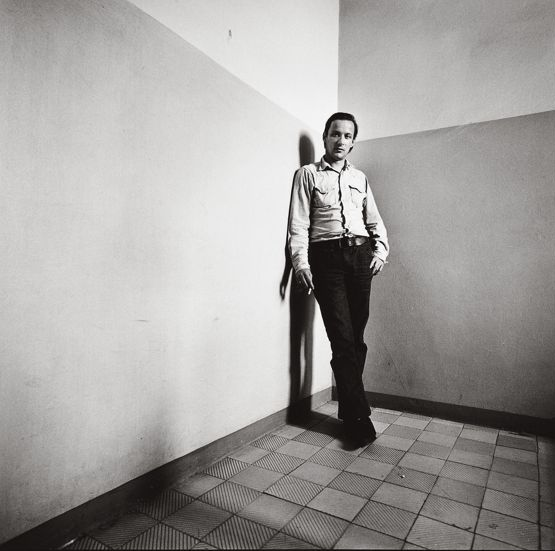
Blinky Palermo

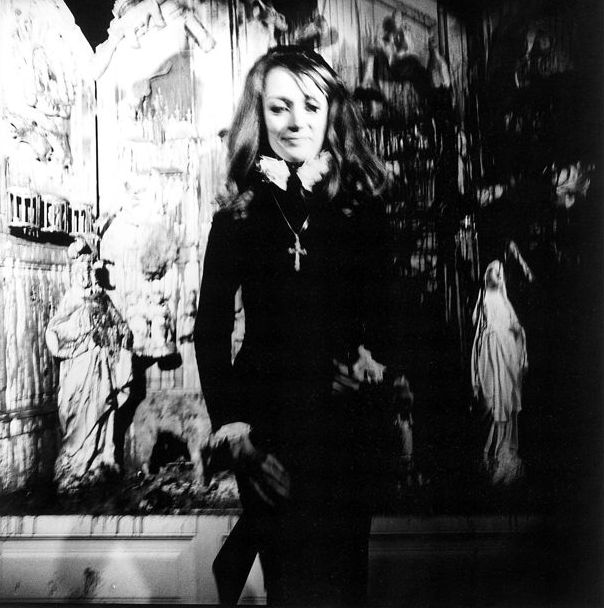
Niki de Saint Phalle

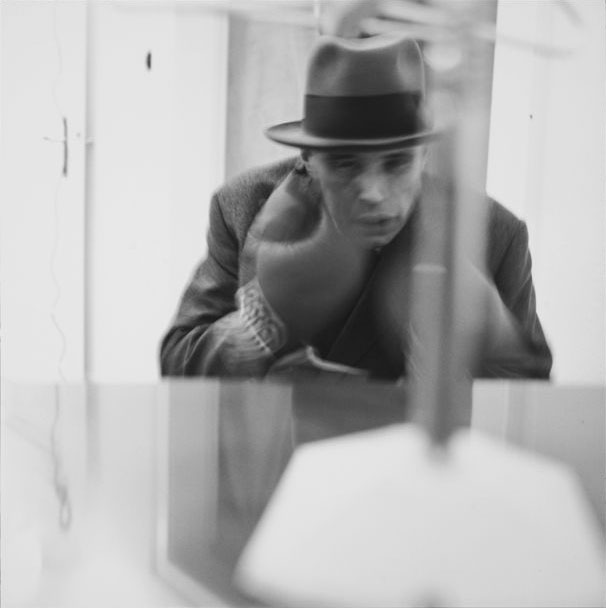
Joseph Beuys

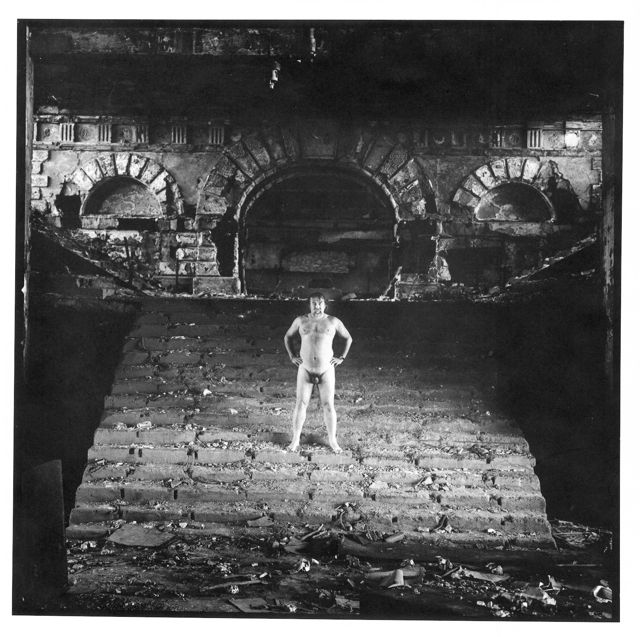
Edward Kienholz

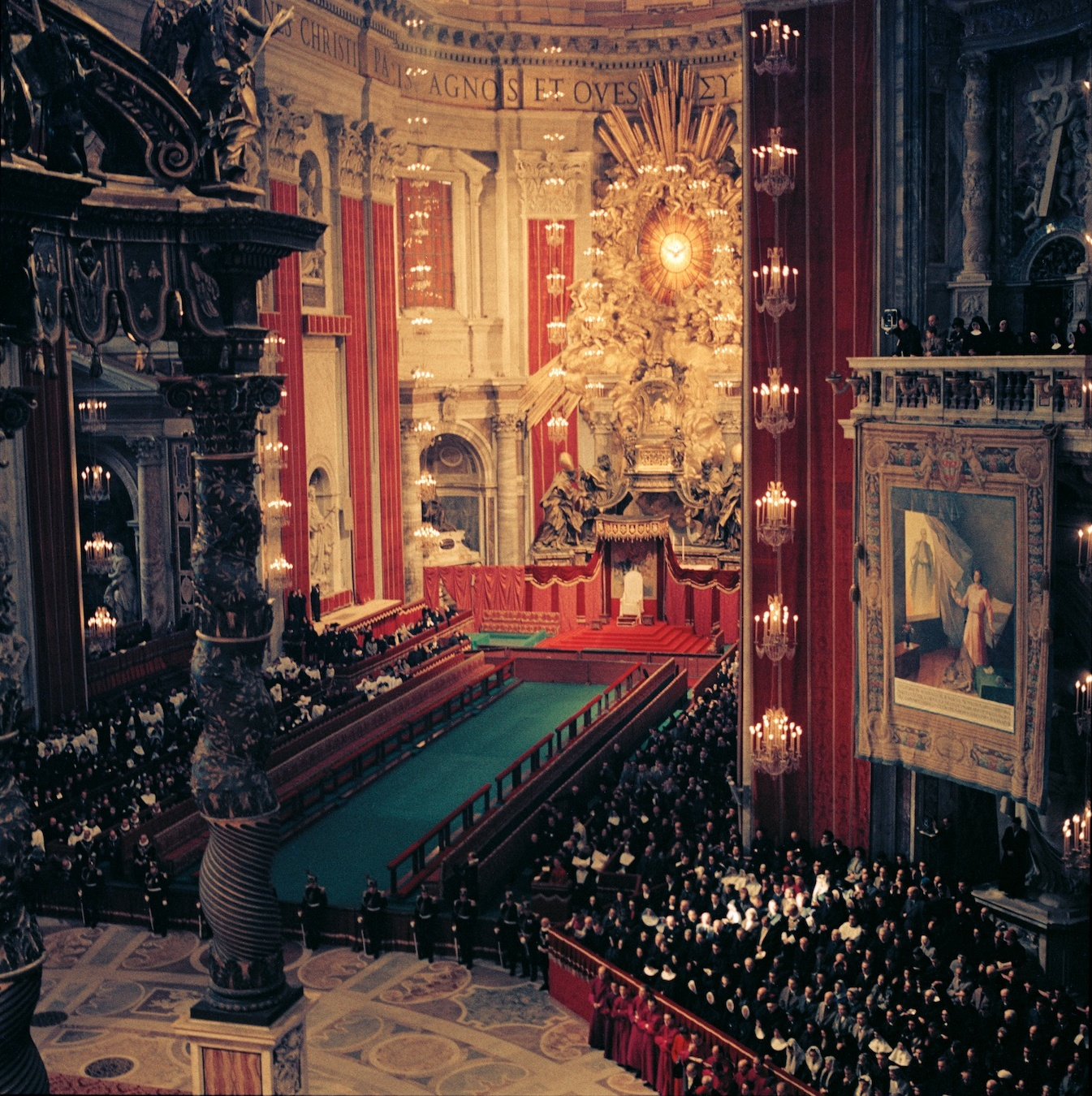
Second Vatican Council

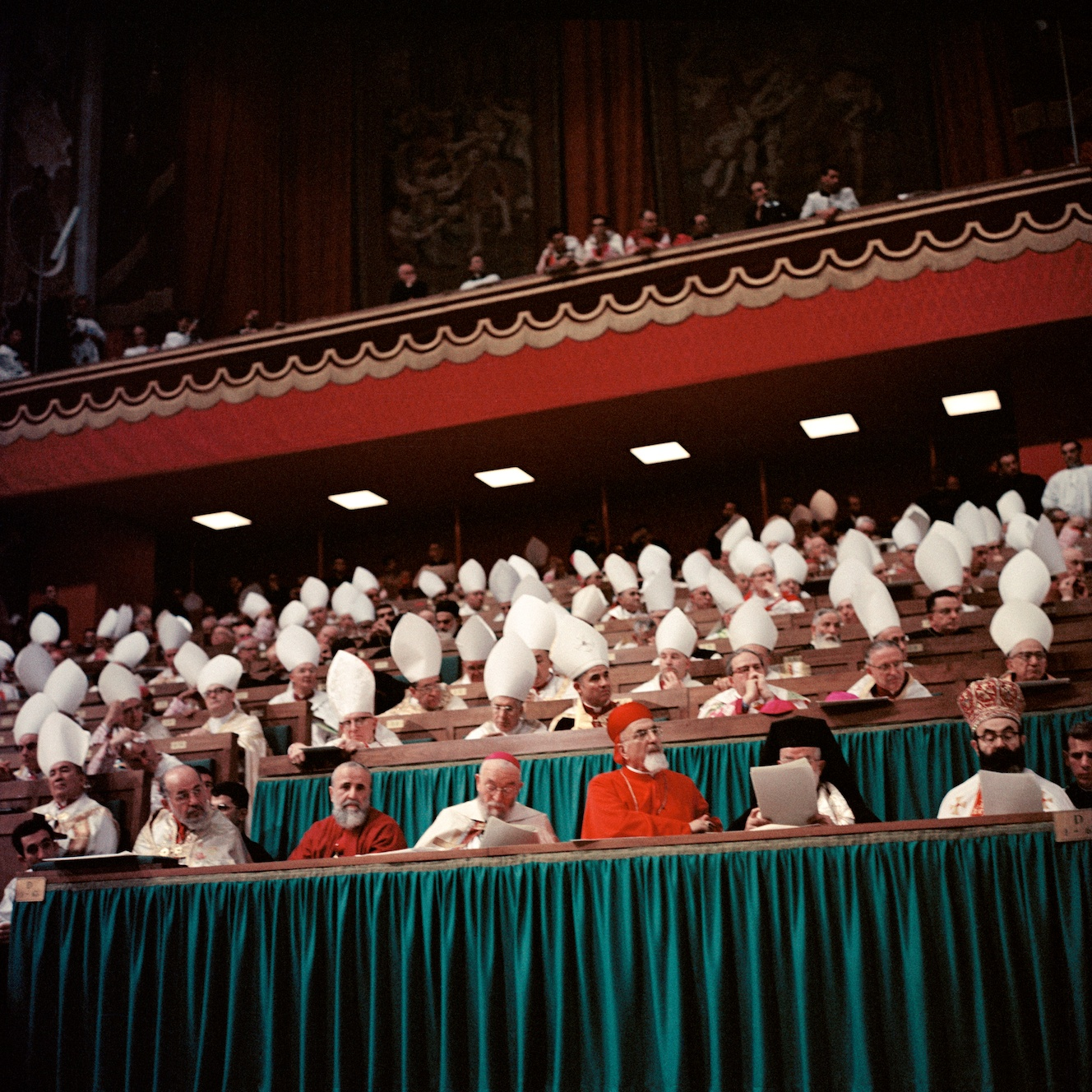
Second Vatican Council

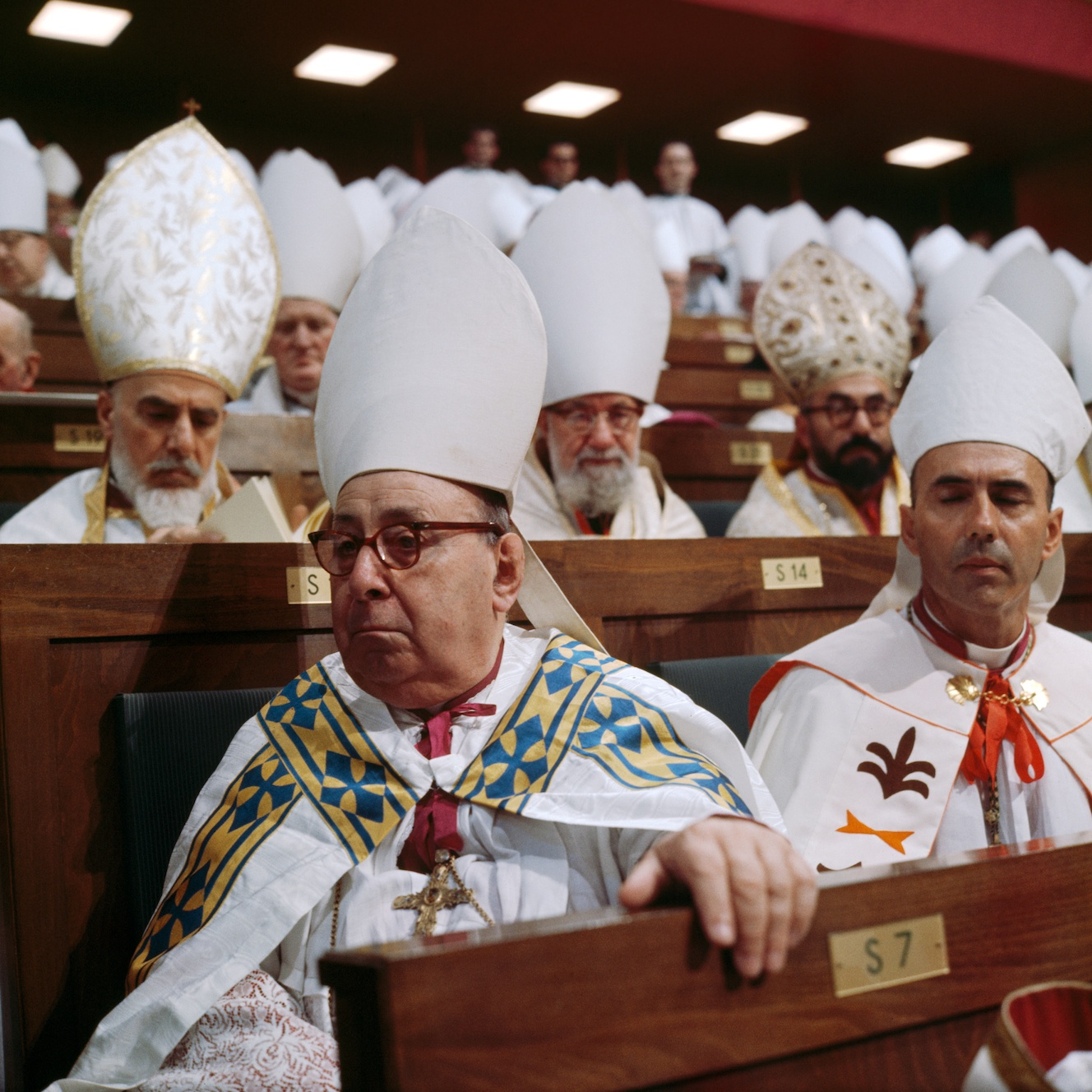
Second Vatican Council

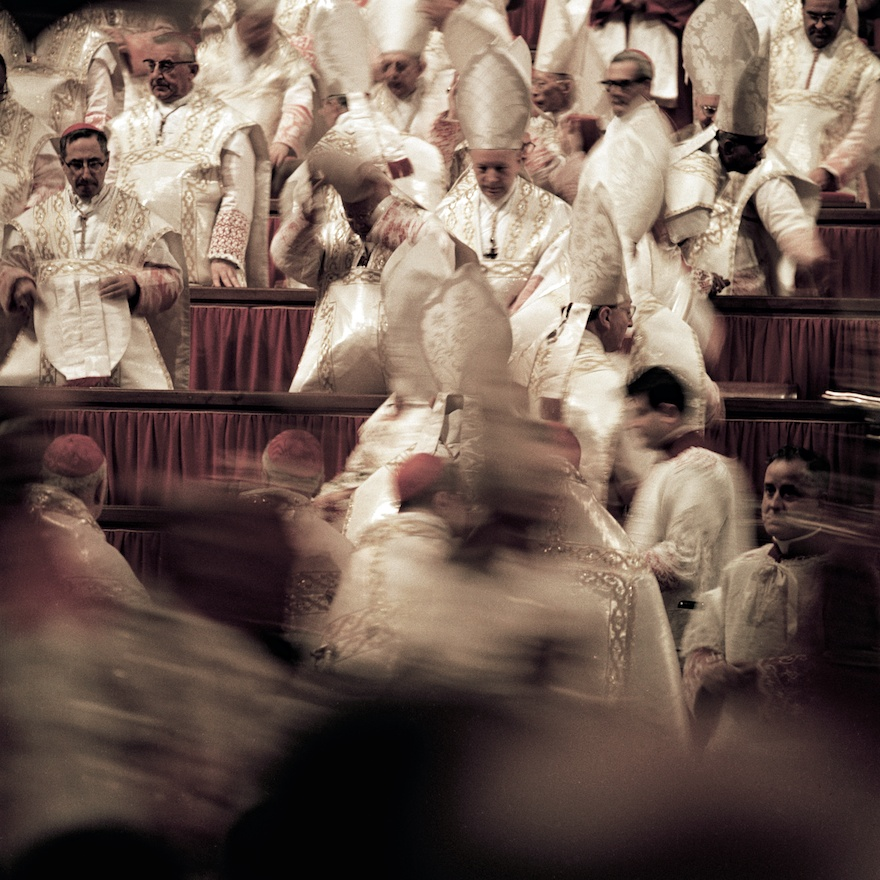
Second Vatican Council

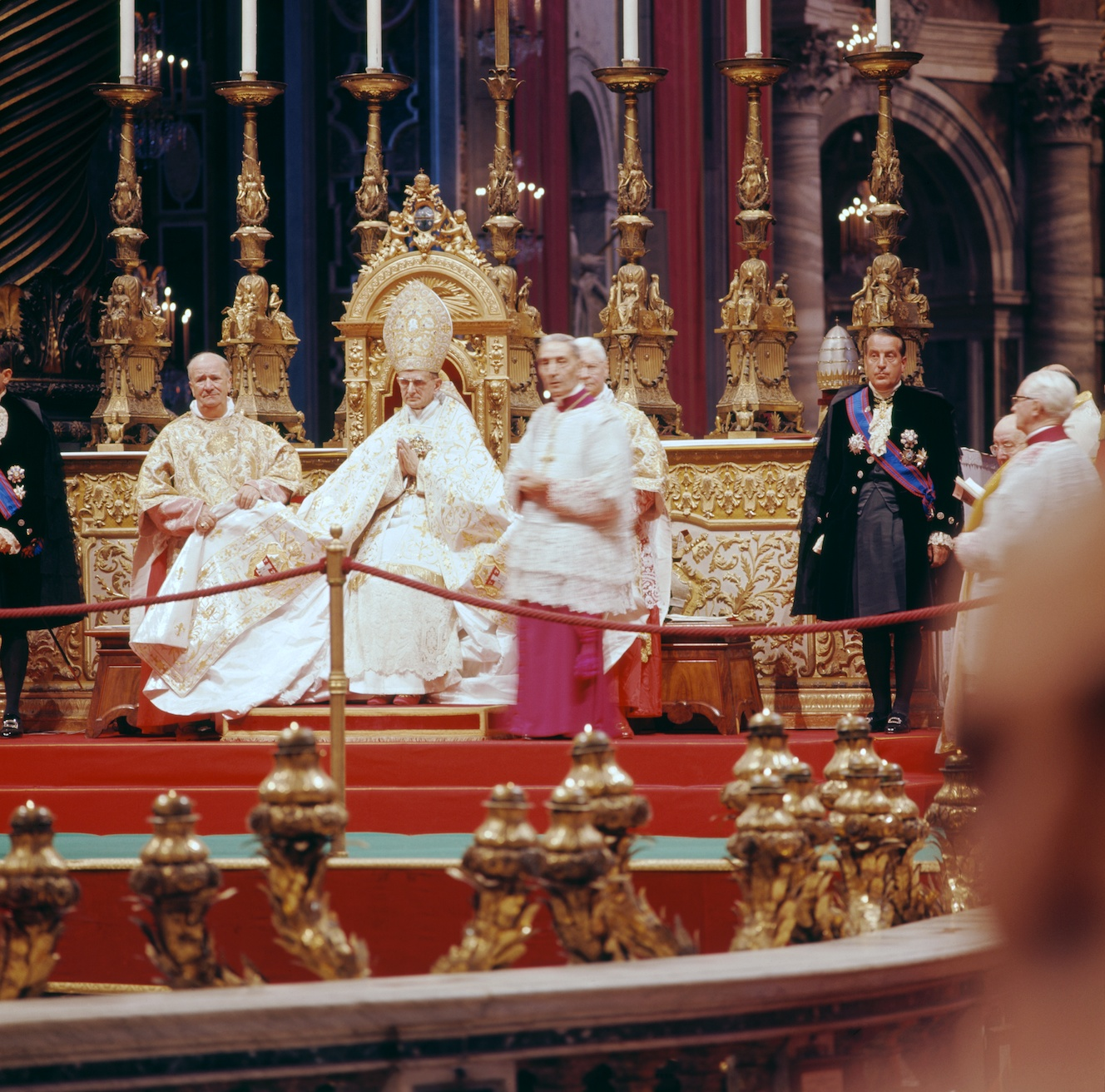
Paul VI

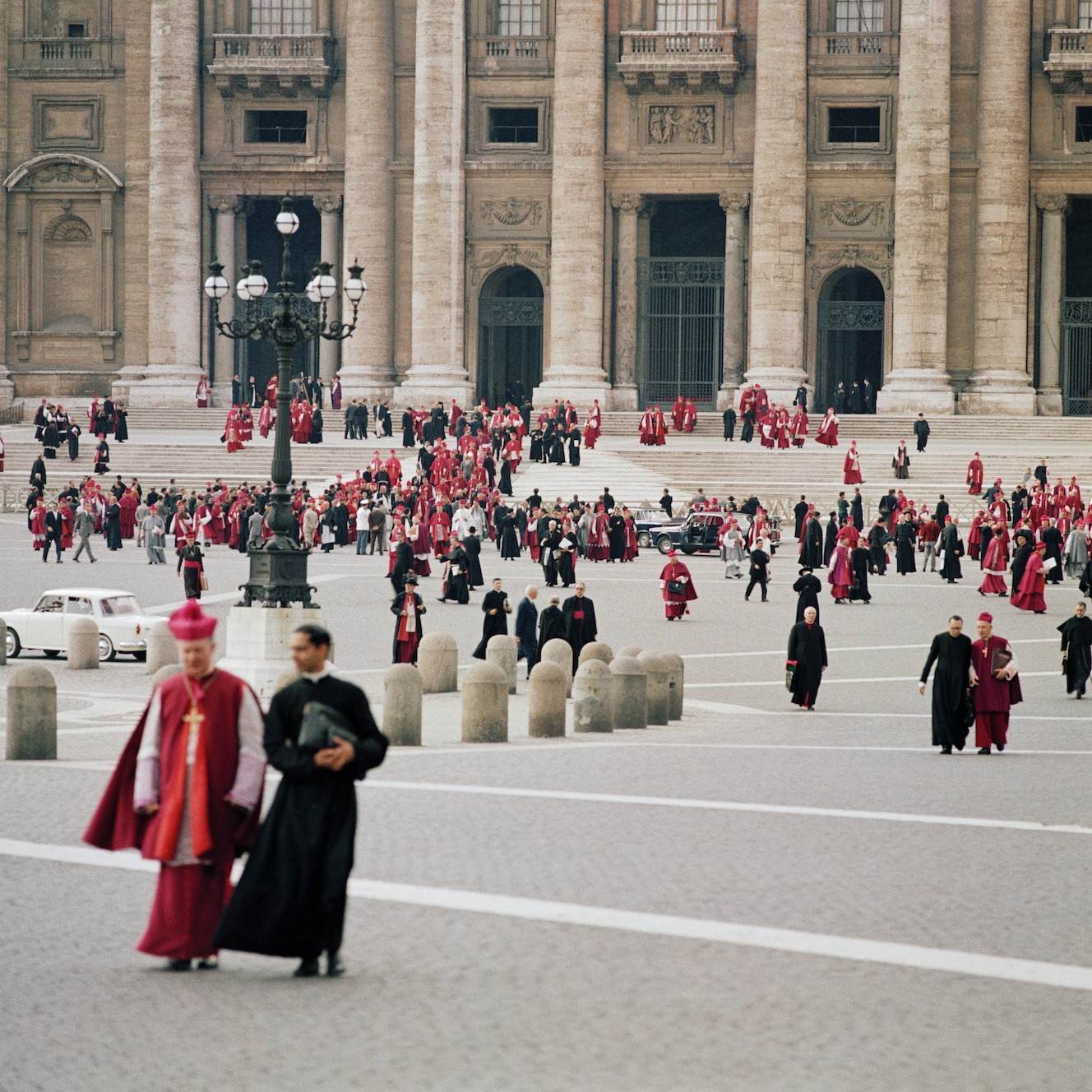
Second Vatican Council

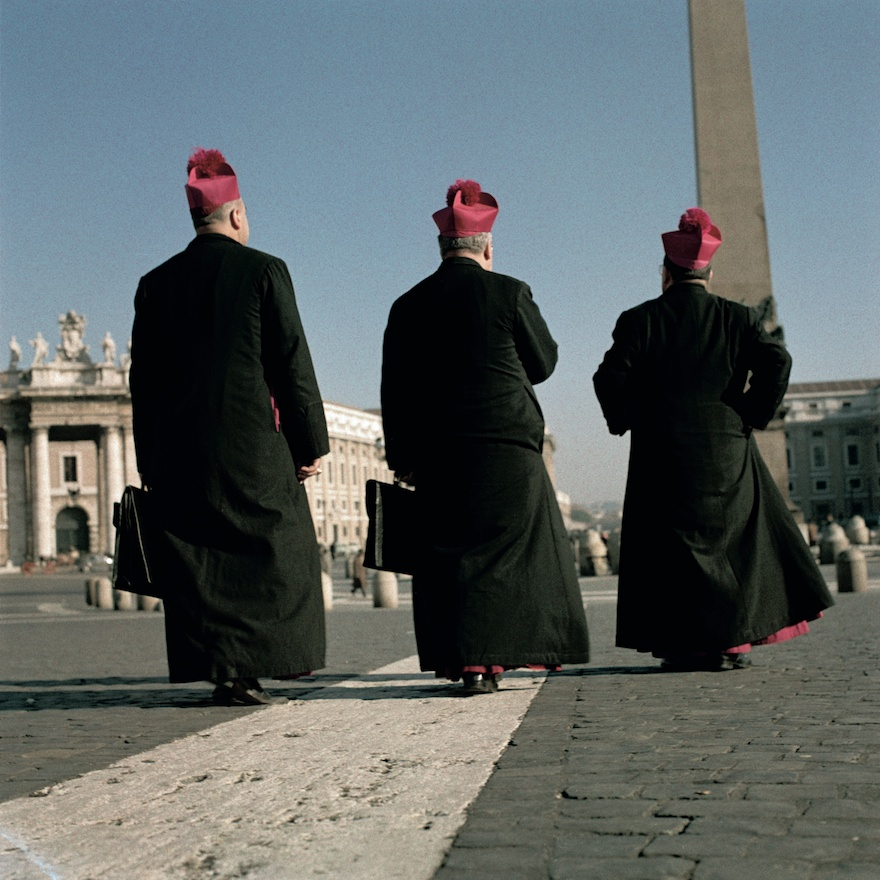
Second Vatican Council

== Publications ==
- 1965: The Council: The Second Vatican Council; Chr. Belser Verlag
- 1970: UdSSR. Der Sowjetstaat und seine Menschen. (USSR: The Soviet State and its people); Chr. Belser Verlag
- 1971: Günther Uecker / Lothar Wolleh: Nagelbuch; Verlag Galerie Der Spiegel, Cologne
- 1972: Lothar Wolleh: Art Scene Düsseldorf 1; Chr. Belser Verlag
- 1973: Das Unterwasserbuch (The Underwater Book, together with Joseph Beuys.)
- 1975: Lothar Wolleh: Apostolorum Limina; Arcade Verlag, Arcade Verlag
- 1978: Günther Uecker: Ludwig van Beethovens Leonore. Idee einer Oper; Besser Verlag
- 1981: Lothar Wolleh (Photo), Günther Uecker, Guido de Werd (text): Bühnenskulpturen für Lohengrin, Städtisches Museum Haus Koekkoek, Kleve
