= Guido de Werd =

Dutch art historian and curator (born 1948)

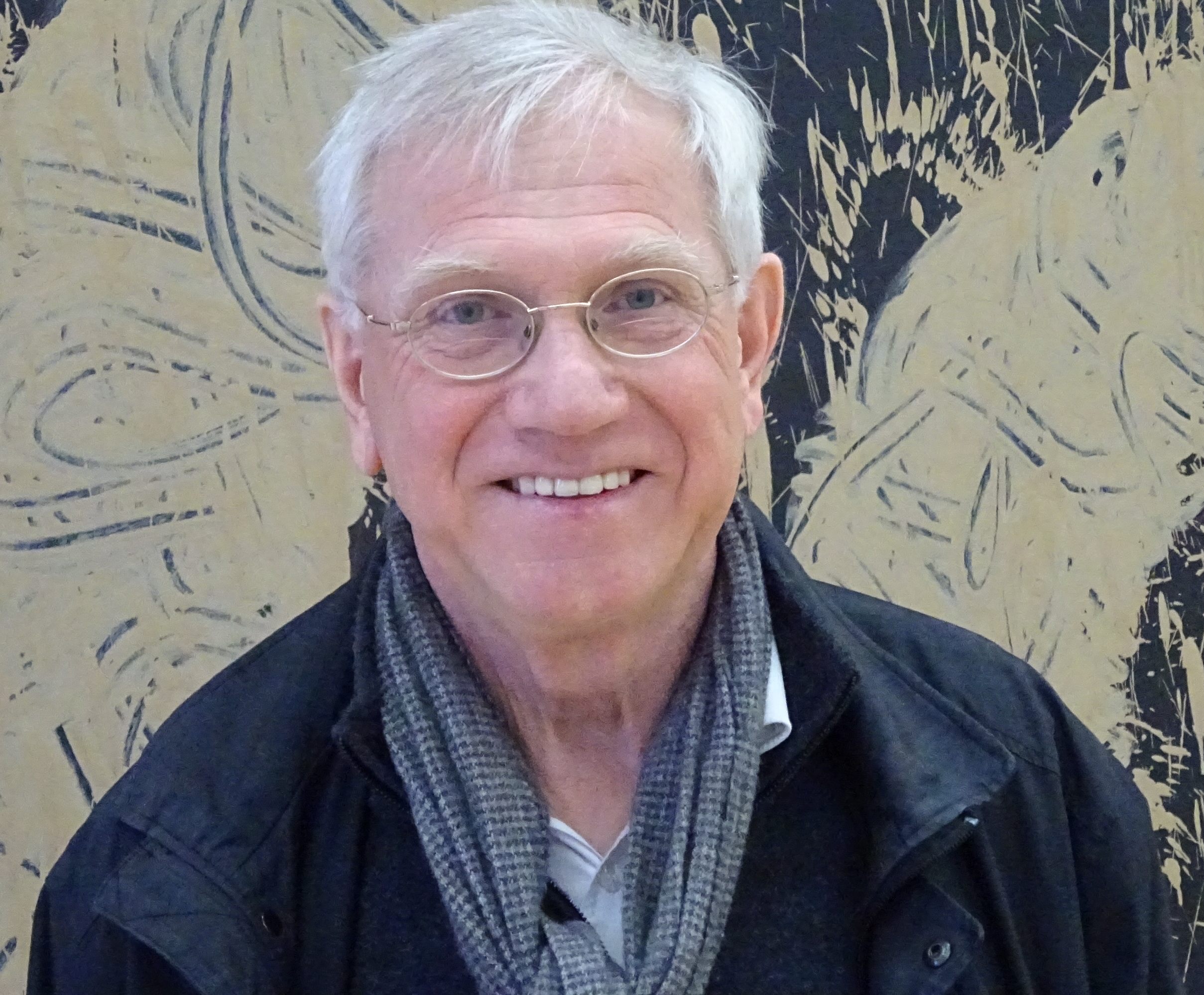
- Guido de Werd in 2017
- Born: 1948 (age 77–78); Oss, Netherlands
- Occupation: art historian

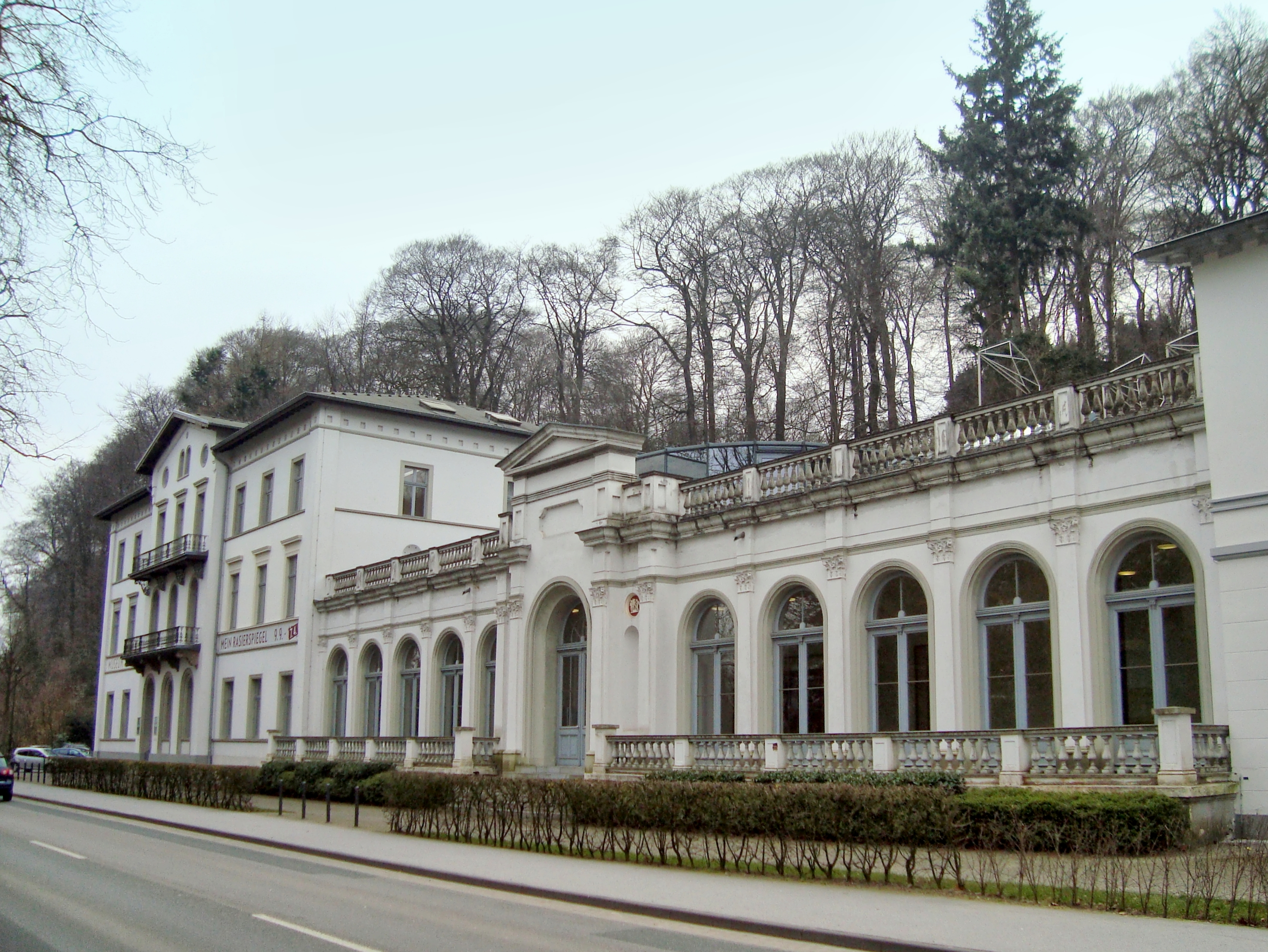
Museum Kurhaus Kleve, 2013

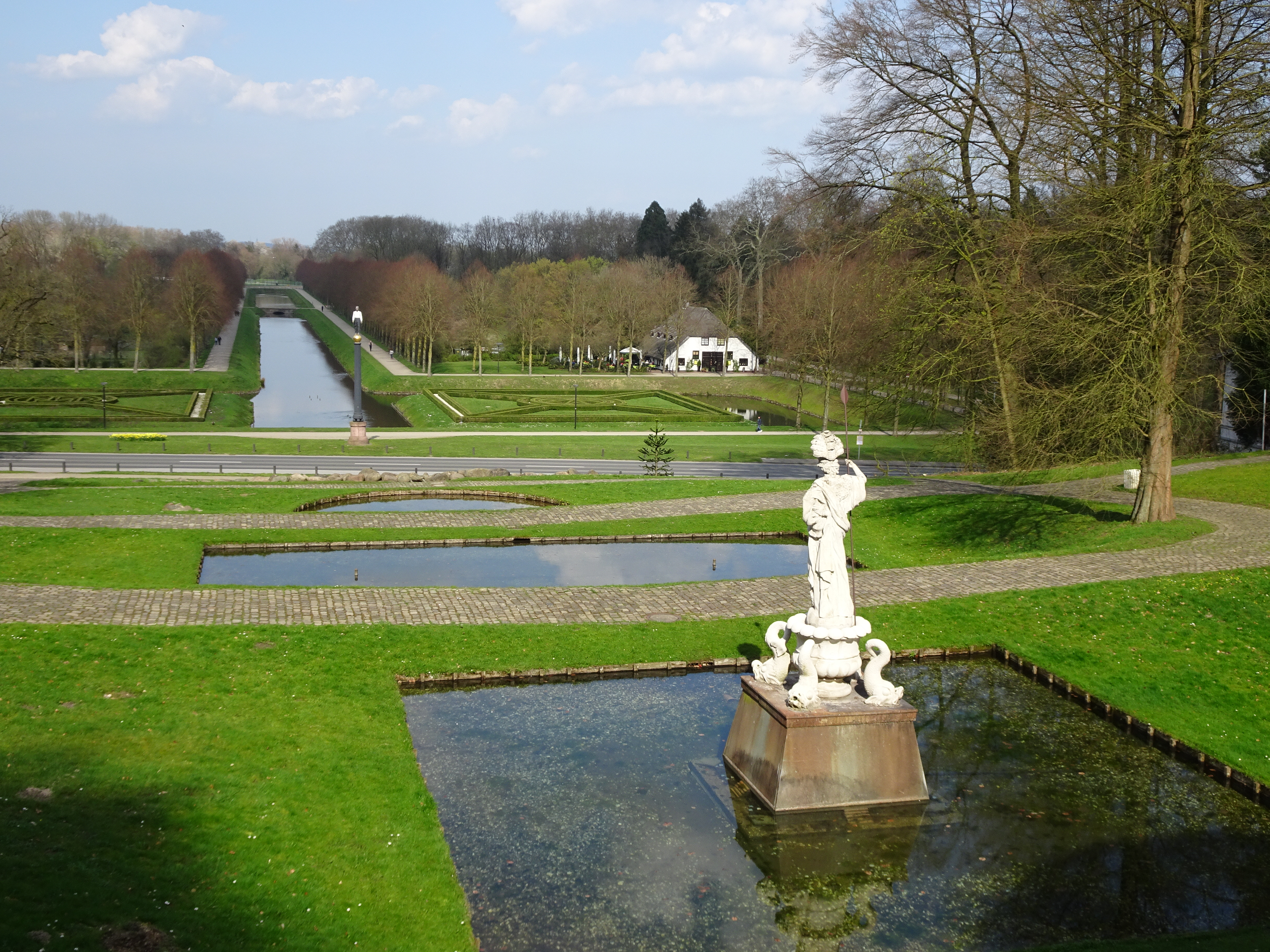
Amphitheater Kleve, 2013

Guido de Werd (born 1948) is a Dutch art historian and former director of Museum Kurhaus Kleve in Germany.

== Life and career ==
De Werd was born in Oss. His father Toon de Werd (1906-1977) was after 1940 curator of Museum Jan Cunen. De Werd studied art history and obtained his master's degree in Nijmegen. In 1972 he started working in the municipal museum in Kleve just across the border as the assistant to Friedrich Gorissen and from 1976 as the artistic director of the museum Haus Koekkoek, located in the former townhouse of Barend Cornelis Koekkoek. Apart from art exhibitions and catalogues he produced publications about art and architectural monuments in Kleve and in its surrounds.

From 1985 onward he pursued the idea of opening of a new art museum in the former spa hotel of Kleve. It would be located in the middle of the baroque landscape gardens set up in the 17th century by John Maurice, Prince of Nassau-Siegen. Cornerstone of the collection would be a large number of works by Ewald Mataré, donated by his daughter Sonja Mataré.

The Museum Kurhaus Kleve - Ewald Mataré Sammlung was opened in 1997. More than 50 exhibitions in the following ten years showed the works of internationally known artists such as Jannis Kounellis, Richard Long, Alex Katz, Mark Tansey and Giuseppe Penone. In 2004 the museum was chosen as 'museum of the year 2004' by the International Association of Art Critics.

In 2012 Museum Kurhaus Kleve was expanded with new exhibition rooms and the newly renovated Friedrich-Wilhelm-Bad with the former workshop of Joseph Beuys. For this project the friends of the house had raised significant funds. In 2010 De Werd had retired as CEO of both museums, remaining 'senior curator' of Museum Kurhaus Kleve until 2014. After retiring he received several awards for his outstanding achievements.

Guido de Werd is married to the art historian and art curator Rita Kersting. He lived with his family in Jerusalem from 2012. In 2016 they returned to the Lower Rhine region.

== Awards ==
- Knight of the Order of Orange-Nassau
- 2013: Rheinlandtaler
- 2013: Order of Merit of the Federal Republic of Germany

== Publications ==
- (ed.): Das Gesicht einer Stadt. Erhaltenswerte Gebäude in Kleve. Boss, Kleve 1977.
- Jan de Beyer, Zeichnungen vom Emmerich bis Roermond, Kleve 1980, ISBN 3-9800289-1-7
- St Nicolai, Kalkar. Munich 1983. 2nd edition 1986. 3rd edition 1990. New edition 2002, ISBN 3-422-06336-6
- Barend Cornelis Koekkoek, 1803–1862. Zeichnungen. Boss, Kleve 1983.
- Die katholische Stifts- und Propsteikirche St Mariae Himmelfahrt zu Kleve. Deutscher Kunstverlag, Munich 1985
- (ed.): Die Reise an den Niederrhein und nach Holland 1791. Das Tagebuch des späteren Königin von Preussen. Deutscher Kunstverlag, München 1987, ISBN 3-422-06010-3
- Joseph Beuys. Kleve, Städtisches Museum Haus Koekkoek, 21 April bis 9 Juni 1991. Ausstellung und Katalog: Guido de Werd. Boss, Kleve 1991, ISBN 3-89413-331-7.
- Ewald Mataré Zeichnungen. catalogue raisonné of drawings with Sonja Mataré, Boss, Kleve 1992 ISBN 3-89413-332-5
- Fritz Getlinger, Joseph Beuys and the Straßenbahnhaltestelle. Ausstellung und Katalog Guido de Werd. Freundeskreis Museum Kurhaus und Koekkoek-Haus Kleve, Kleve 2000, ISBN 3-934935-01-X
- Henrik Douverman. Die Heiligen Drei Könige. Freundeskreis Museum Kurhaus und Koekkoek-Haus, Kleve 2006, ISBN 3-934935-31-1
- publisher.: Mein Rasierspiegel. Von Holthuys bis Beuys. Museum Kurhaus Kleve, Kleve 2012, ISBN 978-3-934935-61-7
