= Goch =

- Town
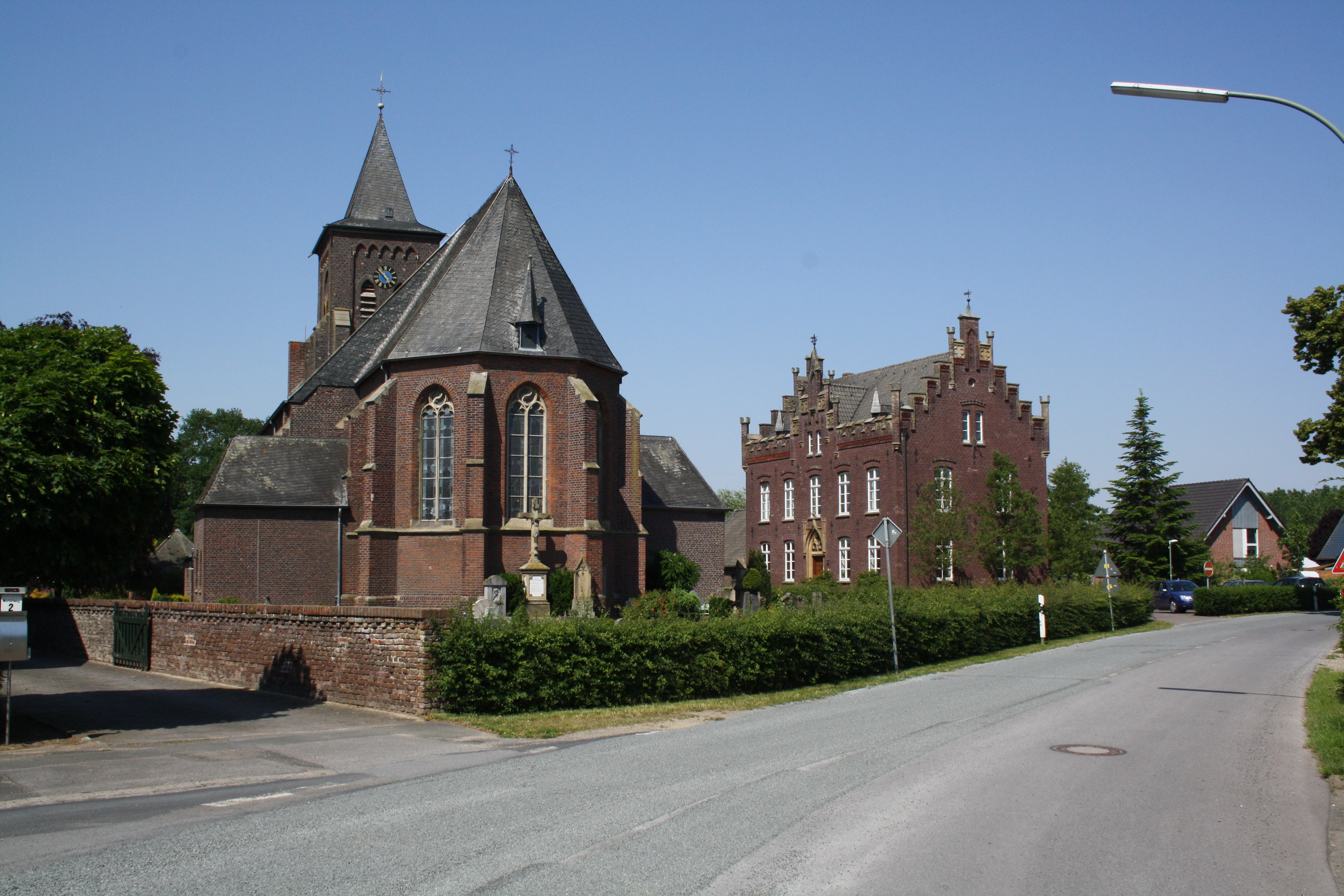
- St. Peter Church and vicarage Goch Hommersum

- Coat of arms

- Location of Goch within Kleve district
- Interactive map of Goch
- Location within Germany Location within North Rhine-Westphalia
- Coordinates: 51°41′2″N 06°9′43″E
- Country: Germany
- State: North Rhine-Westphalia
- Admin. region: Düsseldorf
- District: Kleve

Government
  - Mayor (2020–25): Ulrich Knickrehm

Area
  - Total: 115.43 km^{2} (44.57 sq mi)
- Elevation: 18 m (59 ft)

Population (2025-12-31)
  - Total: 34,825
  - Density: 301.70/km^{2} (781.39/sq mi)
- Time zone: UTC+01:00 (CET)
  - Summer (DST): UTC+02:00 (CEST)
- Postal codes: 47574
- Dialling codes: 02823, 02827 (Kessel, Hassum, Hommersum)
- Vehicle registration: KLE
- Website: www.goch.de

Goch (German: [ɡɔx]; archaic spelling: Gog) is a town in the Kleve district of North Rhine-Westphalia, Germany, close to the border with the Netherlands, 12 km (7 mi) south of Kleve and 27 km (17 mi) southeast of Nijmegen.

== History ==
Historical affiliations

County of Guelders 1259–1339
Duchy of Guelders 1339–1393
Duchy of Jülich 1393–1423
Duchy of Guelders 1423–1473
Duchy of Cleves 1473–1521
United Duchies of Jülich-Cleves-Berg 1521–1614
Duchy of Cleves 1614–1622
Spanish Empire 1622–1625
Duchy of Cleves 1625–1666
Brandenburg-Prussia 1666–1701
Kingdom of Prussia 1701–1757
Kingdom of France 1757–1762
Kingdom of Prussia 1762–1795
French Republic 1795–1804
French Empire 1804–1815
Kingdom of Prussia 1815–1871
German Empire 1871–1918
Weimar Republic 1919–1933
Nazi Germany 1933–1945
Allied-occupied Germany 1945–1949
West Germany 1949–1990
Germany 1990–present

Goch is at least 750 years old: the earliest mention of Goch is in a document dated 1259. It was a part of the Duchy of Cleves. During World War II, the city was completely destroyed by Allied bombers during Operation Veritable. On September 8, 2011, A Magnitude 4.5 struck the town, causing damage to infrasctructure and to homes.

== Population ==
Historical population

Year	Pop.	±% p.a.
1965	26,275	—
1970	27,617	+1.00%
1975	28,209	+0.43%
1980	28,779	+0.40%
1985	28,415	−0.25%
1990	29,843	+0.99%
1995	31,186	+0.88%

Year	Pop.	±% p.a.
2000	32,675	+0.94%
2005	33,948	+0.77%
2010	34,106	+0.09%
2015	33,889	−0.13%
2020	34,531	+0.38%
2025	34,825	+0.17%

Source: Landesdatabank Nordrhein-Westfalen

== Twin towns – sister cities ==
Goch is twinned with:

- Andover, England, United Kingdom
- Meierijstad, Netherlands (formerly Veghel)
- Nowy Tomyśl, Poland
- Redon, France

== Notable people ==
- Otto III (980–1002), Holy Roman Emperor
- Johannes von Goch (c. 1400–1475), Medieval theologian
- Maarten Schenck van Nydeggen (1540–1589), military commander in the Netherlands
- Francisco de Moncada (1586–1635), Spanish author, military leader, and governor of the Spanish Netherlands, died here
- Aenne Biermann (1898–1933), photographer
- Hubert Houben (1898–1956), athlete
- Josefa Idem (born 1964), Italian sprint canoer and politician
- Arnold Janssen (1837–1909), founder of the Society of the Divine Word, a Roman Catholic missionary congregation
- Rita Kersting (born 1969), art historian
- Luisa Wensing (born 1993), footballer

Vincent van Gogh, according to his name, which translates to "Vincent from Goch", has ancestors likely native to this location.

== Gallery ==
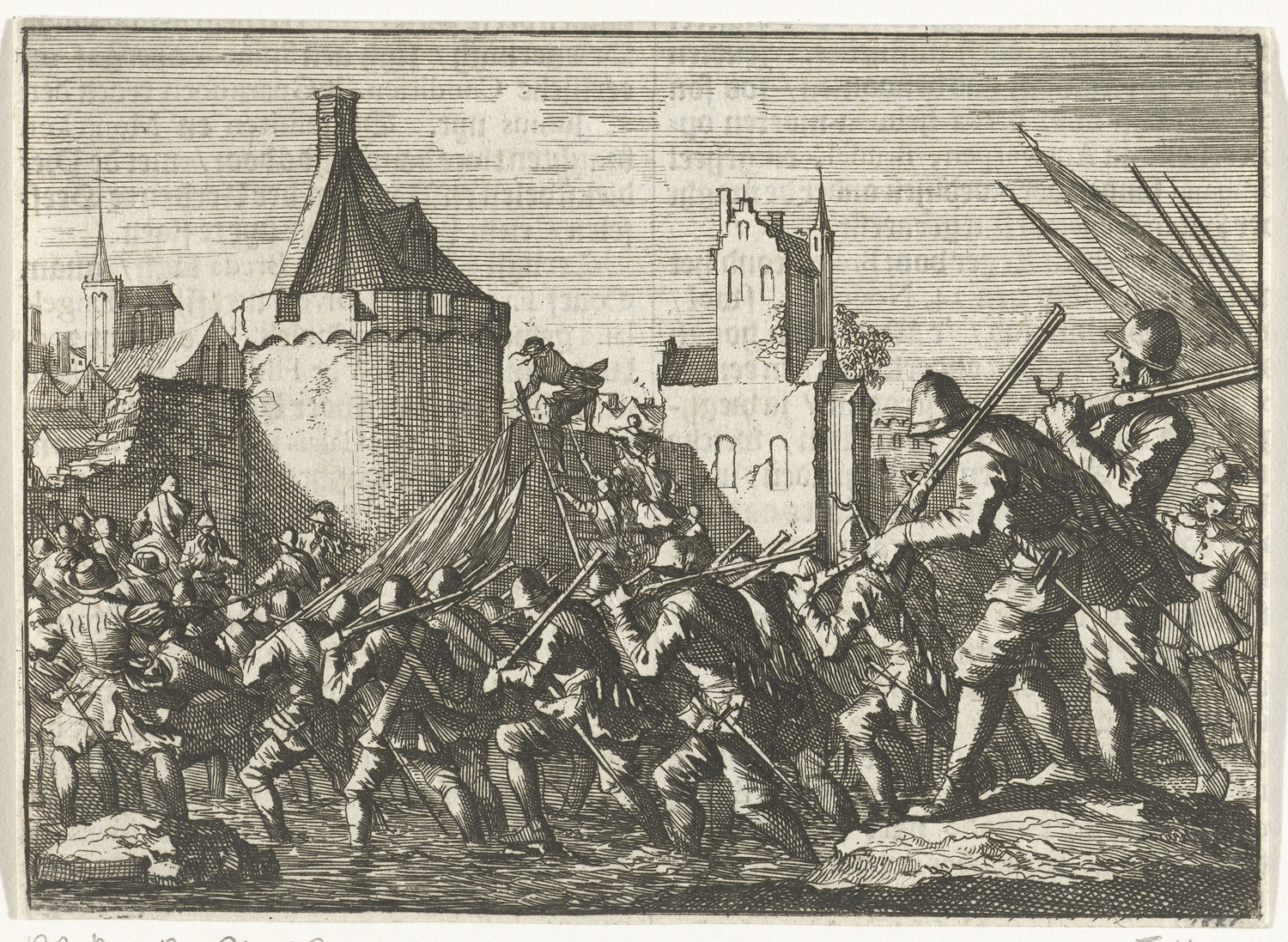
Siege of Goch in 1625, by Jan Luyken

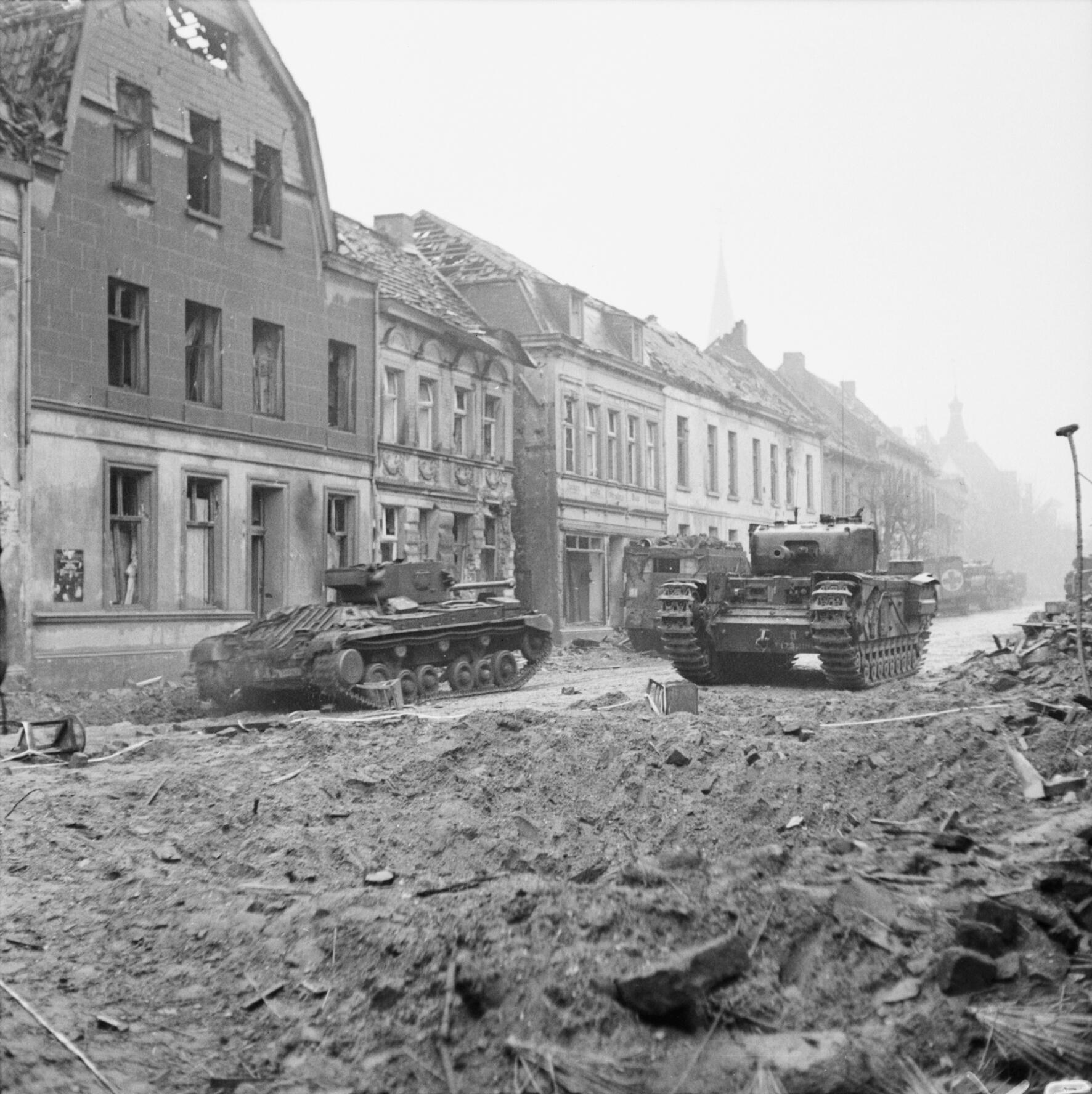
Goch during Operation Veritable, February 21, 1945

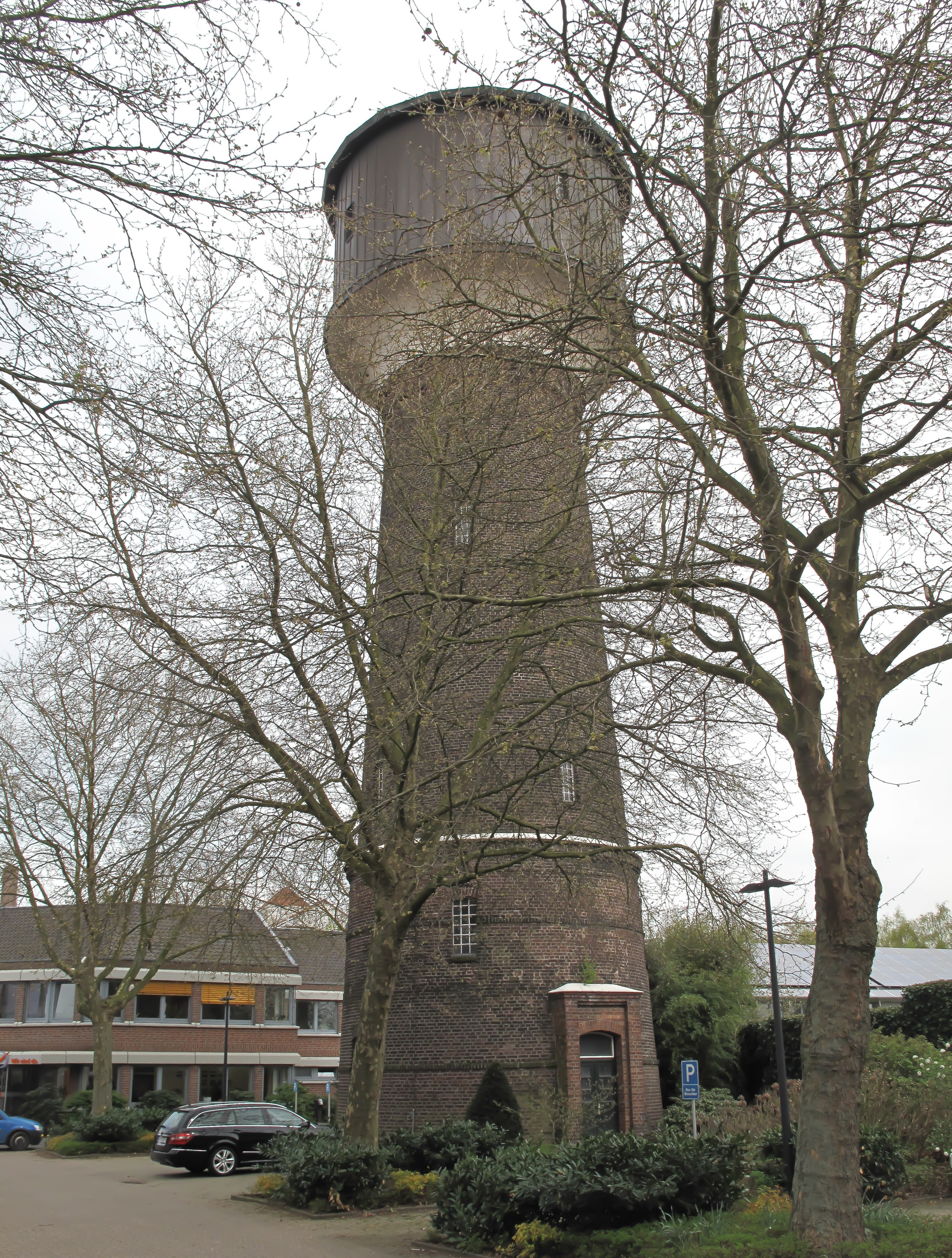
Watertower

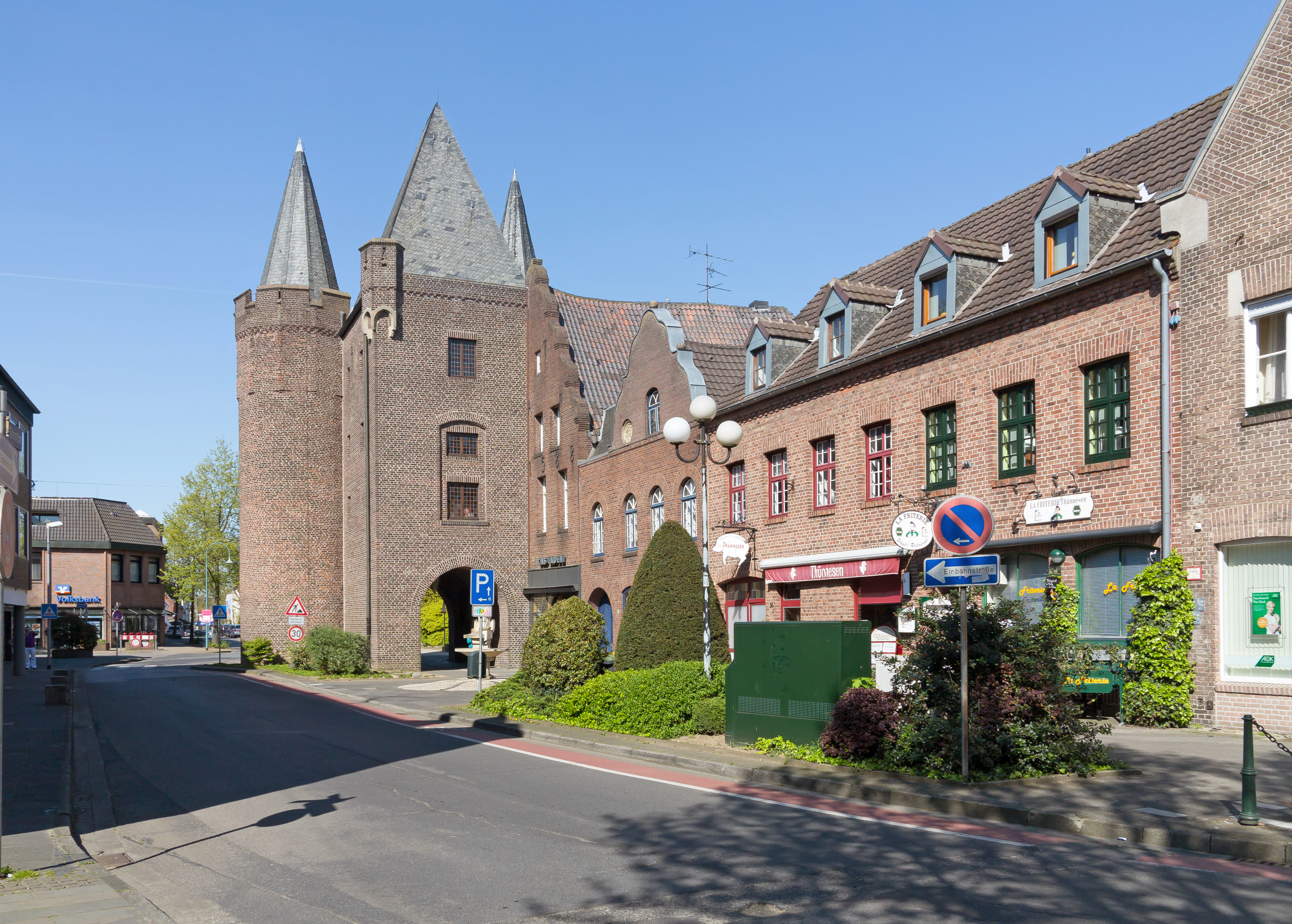
Am Steintor Street

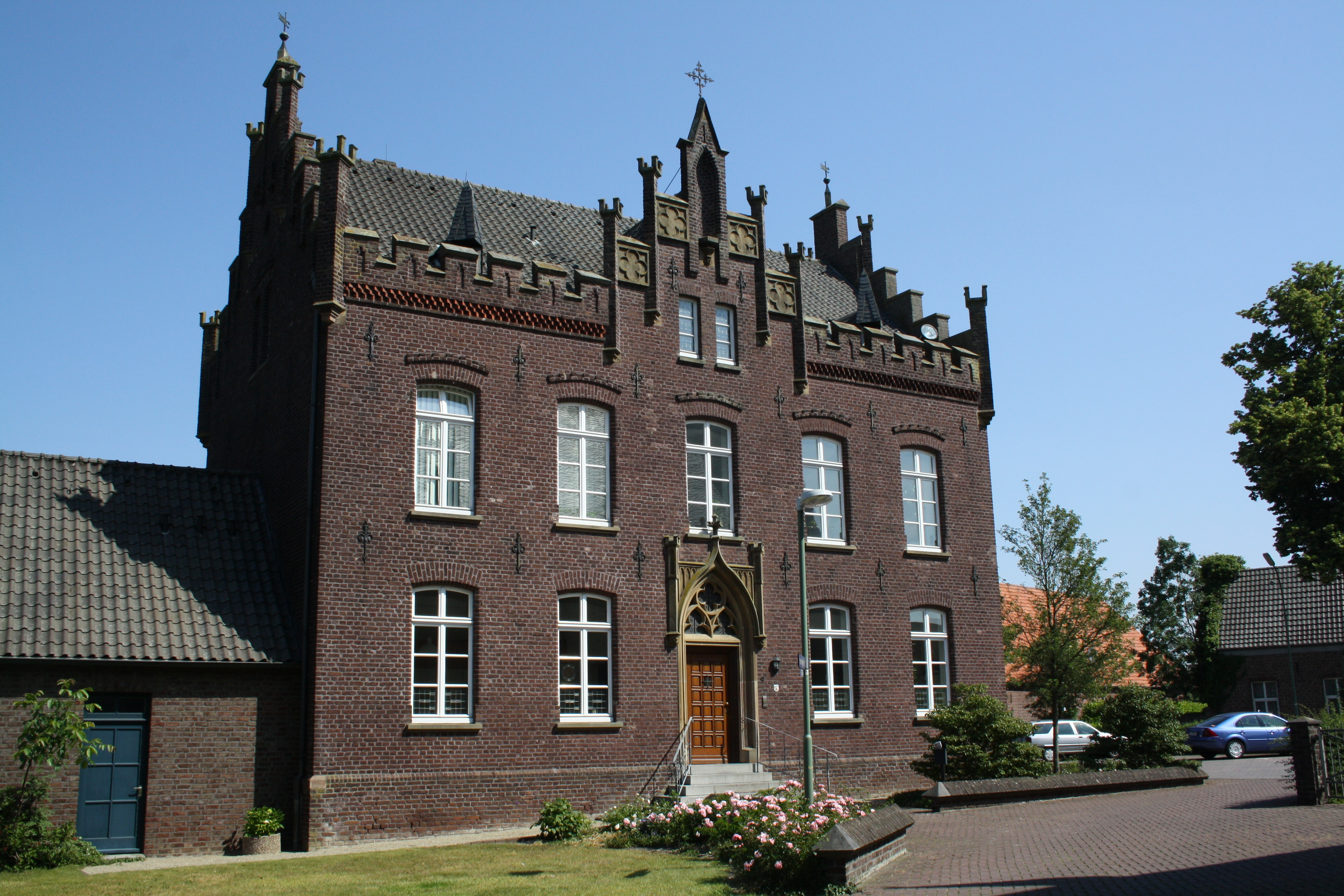
Vicarage Goch Hommersum

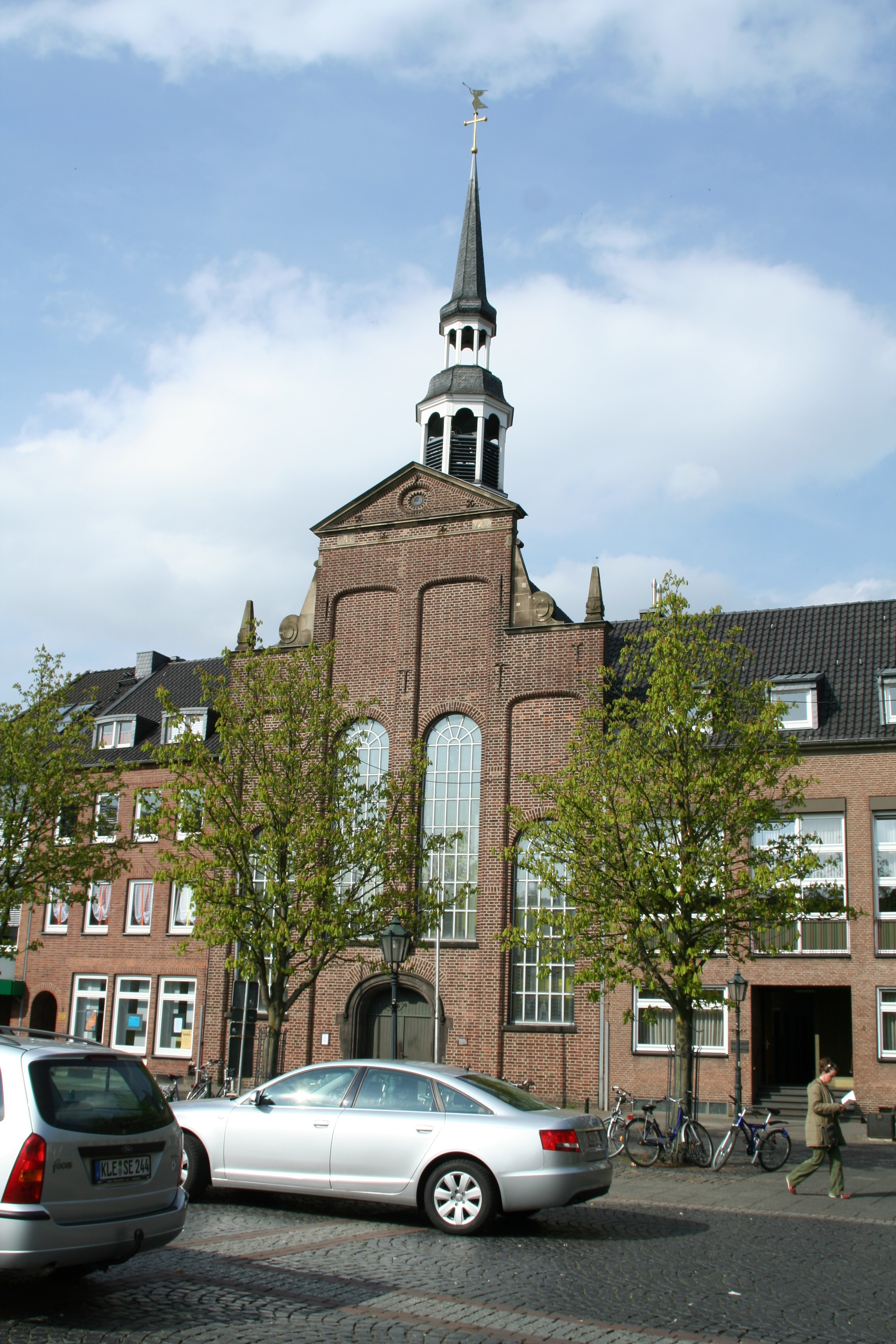
Protestant church
