= Aenne Biermann =

German photographer

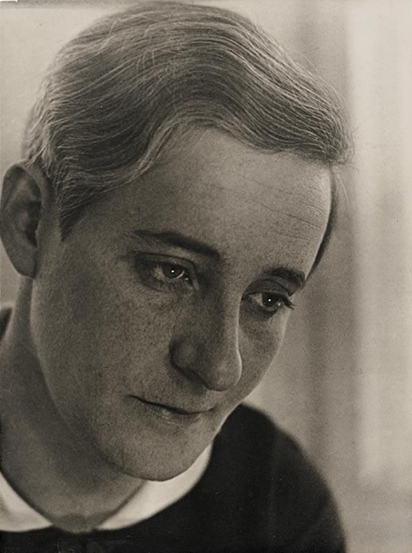
- Self portrait, 1931
- Born: Anna Sibilla Sternfeld; March 8, 1898; Goch, North Rhine-Westphalia
- Died: January 14, 1933 (aged 34); Gera
- Occupation: Photographer
- Movement: New Objectivity
- Spouse: Herbert Joseph Biermann (m. 1920)
- Children: 2

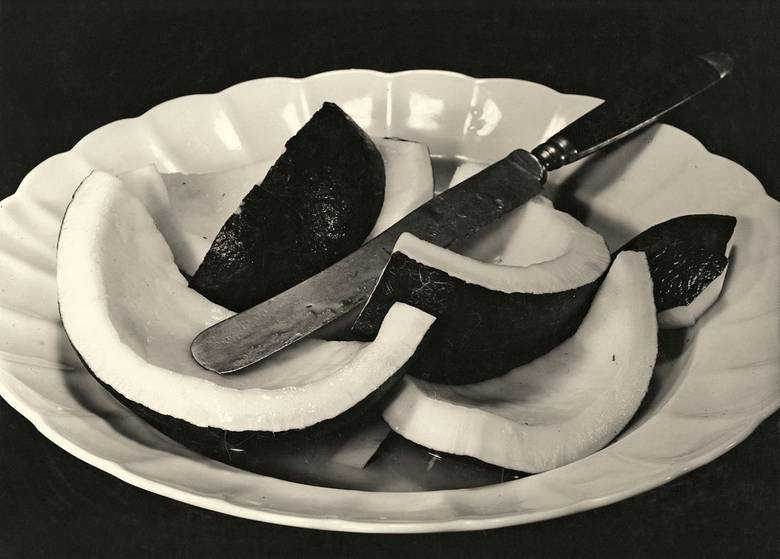
Cocosnuss, 1929

Aenne Biermann (March 8, 1898 – January 14, 1933), born Anna Sibilla Sternfeld, was a German photographer of Ashkenazi Jewish origin. She was one of the major proponents of New Objectivity, a significant art movement that developed in the Weimar Republic in the 1920s.

== Biography ==
Biermann was born on March 8, 1898, in Goch, a town in North Rhine-Westphalia. She was born into a wealthy Ashkenazi family; her father Alfons Sternfeld owned a leather factory that he had inherited from his father Wolfgang Sternfeld. Her mother was Julie Geck. In 1920 Aenne Sternfeld married Herbert Joseph Biermann, a wealthy textile merchant from Goch. The couple had two children; in 1921 a daughter named a Helga and in 1923 a son named Gershon. Aenne died of a liver disease in 1933 in Gera.

== Career ==
Biermann was a self-taught photographer. Her first subjects were her two children, Helga and Gershon. The majority of Biermann's photographs were shot between 1925 and 1933. Gradually she became one of the major proponents of New Objectivity, an important art movement in the Weimar Republic. Her work became internationally known in the late 1920s, when it was part of every major exhibition of German photography.

Major exhibitions of her work include the Munich Kunstkabinett, the Deutscher Werkbund and the exhibition of Folkwang Museum in 1929. Other important exhibitions include the exhibition entitled Das Lichtbild held in Munich in 1930 and the 1931 exhibition at the Palace of Fine Arts (French: Palais des Beaux Arts) in Brussels. Since 1992 the Museum of Gera has held an annual contest for the Aenne Biermann Prize for Contemporary German Photography, which is one of the most important events of its kind in Germany.
