= Herbert Zangs =

German artist

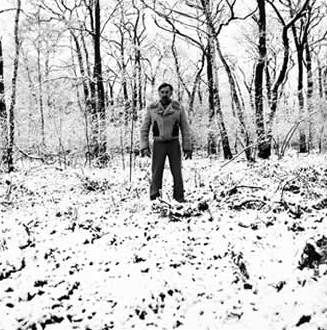
Herbert Zangs photographed by Lothar Wolleh

Herbert Zangs (March 27, 1924 – March 26, 2003) was a German artist associated with postwar abstraction. He is best known for his white material collages and reliefs (Verweißungen), which contributed significantly to the development of abstract art in Germany after World War II.

== Early life and education ==
Zangs was born in Krefeld, Germany. From 1941 he served in the German military during World War II, including deployment in Scandinavia, and was held as a prisoner of war until 1945. After his release, he studied under Otto Pankok at the Kunstakademie Düsseldorf from 1945 onward.

Following the completion of his studies, Zangs undertook extensive travels throughout Europe and North Africa, including Italy, France, Algeria, Egypt, and Morocco. These journeys had a lasting influence on his artistic development.

== Artistic career ==
In the early 1950s, Zangs transitioned from figurative painting to abstraction. From 1952 onward, he developed white material collages, reliefs, and object-based works known as Verweißungen, in which everyday materials and surfaces were unified through monochrome white pigmentation. These works are regarded as an early contribution to German postwar abstraction and as anticipatory of later developments such as Art Informel and the ZERO group.

In 1952, Zangs received the Art Prize of the City of Krefeld. During the late 1950s and early 1960s, he was awarded several international distinctions, including a scholarship from the Cultural Circle of the Federation of German Industries, first prize for a design proposal for the exterior wall of the Berlin Congress Hall, awards in Antwerp, and the Prix d’Europe in 1962.

During this period, Zangs produced serial works, black monochrome cycles, and later the so-called Expansion paintings, characterized by dynamic, radiating forms and vivid color. He lived and worked intermittently in Cucuron, Provence, while maintaining ties to Germany.

== Later years ==
After being expelled from France in 1978, Zangs returned permanently to Germany, living in Krefeld and other locations in North Rhine-Westphalia. In the 1980s, his work included overpainted newspapers and posters, computer-generated drawings, and further serial experiments. Despite the scope of his oeuvre, Zangs remained an independent figure, difficult to classify within established art-historical categories. In 1994, he was awarded the Civic Honor Plaque of the City of Krefeld.

== Death and legacy ==
Herbert Zangs died on March 26, 2003, in Krefeld, one day before his 79th birthday. His artistic estate is managed by the Herbert Zangs Estate Archive Maulberger, which serves as a central source for research and authentication of his work.
