= Straßenbahnhaltestelle =

Straßenbahnhaltestelle / Tramstop / Fermata del Tram, 1961–1976, A Monument to the Future (the complete title) is a work of installation art by the German artist Joseph Beuys. Beuys created this installation for the German pavilion at the 37th Venice Biennale in 1976. Today, two copies of the work exist, one in the Kröller-Müller Museum, Otterlo, and another in the Hamburger Bahnhof, Berlin. The work is based upon Beuys' childhood memories of a tram stop in Kleve on Nassauer Allee. The installation consists of a long, rusty length of rail, four sections of broad, rusty pipe, and a cannon of the early modern type. The cannon is topped by a cast iron head with a sorrowful expression. These elements are laid parallel to one another on the ground.
