= Rita Kersting =

German art historian and curator

Rita Kersting (born 1969) is a German art historian and curator.

== Life and work ==
Born in Goch, Kersting studied history of art at the University of Cologne and completed a curatorial training at De Appel centre for Contemporary Art in Amsterdam. From 2000, she worked as a curator at the Kunstmuseen Krefeld. From 2001 to 2006, she was director of the Kunstverein für die Rheinlande und Westfalen in Düsseldorf. In 2012, she was appointed head of Contemporary art at the Israel Museum of Jerusalem, where she worked until 2016.

From 2014, Kersting was until 2018 a member of the Supervisory Board of the Stedelijk Museum in Amsterdam. She is fellow of the International Curatorial Institute at the Museum of Modern Art in New York. She has been deputy director of the Museum Ludwig in Cologne since September 2016.
