= 1992 in Eritrea =

- Decades: 1970s; 1980s; 1990s; 2000s; 2010s
- See also: Other events of 1992; Timeline of Eritrean history

Events in the year 1992 in Eritrea.

== Incumbents ==
- President: Isaias Afewerki

== Events ==
- 7 April – The government issues a proclamation for a referendum to be held.
