= 2009 in Eritrea =

- Decades: 1980s; 1990s; 2000s; 2010s; 2020s
- See also: Other events of 2009; Timeline of Eritrean history

Events in the year 2009 in Eritrea.

== Incumbents ==
- President: Isaias Afewerki

== Events ==
- 15 – 23 August – The country competed at the 2009 World Championships in Athletics in Berlin.
