= 2005 in Eritrea =

- Decades: 1980s; 1990s; 2000s; 2010s; 2020s
- See also: Other events of 2005; Timeline of Eritrean history

Events in the year 2005 in Eritrea.

== Incumbents ==
- President: Isaias Afewerki

== Events ==
- 14 March – United Nations Security Council resolution 1586 was adopted unanimously and extended the mandate of the United Nations Mission in Ethiopia and Eritrea (UNMEE) until 15 September 2005.
