= 2008 in Eritrea =

- Decades: 1980s; 1990s; 2000s; 2010s; 2020s
- See also: Other events of 2008; Timeline of Eritrean history

Events in the year 2008 in Eritrea.

== Incumbents ==
- President: Isaias Afewerki

== Events ==
- June 10 – 13 – The Djiboutian–Eritrean border conflict occurred between the forces of the country and Djibouti.
