= 1996 in Eritrea =

- Decades: 1970s; 1980s; 1990s; 2000s; 2010s
- See also: Other events of 1996; Timeline of Eritrean history

Events in the year 1996 in Eritrea.

== Incumbents ==
- President: Isaias Afewerki

== Events ==
- 28 October – The Eritrean Investment and Development Bank (EIDB) was established.
- The Eritrean Telecommunication Services Corporation was founded.
