= 2007 in Eritrea =

- Decades: 1980s; 1990s; 2000s; 2010s; 2020s
- See also: Other events of 2007; Timeline of Eritrean history

Events in the year 2007 in Eritrea.

== Incumbents ==
- President: Isaias Afewerki

== Events ==
- 30 July – United Nations Security Council Resolution 1767, which extended the U.N. mandate in the country and Ethiopia, was unanimously adopted.
