= 1999 in Eritrea =

- Decades: 1970s; 1980s; 1990s; 2000s; 2010s
- See also: Other events of 1999; Timeline of Eritrean history

Events in the year 1999 in Eritrea.

== Incumbents ==
- President: Isaias Afewerki

== Events ==
- 29 January – United Nations Security Council resolution 1226 was adopted unanimously and strongly urged the country to accept an agreement proposed by the Organisation of African Unity (OAU) to resolve the conflict between the country and Ethiopia.
