= 1998 in Eritrea =

- Decades: 1970s; 1980s; 1990s; 2000s; 2010s
- See also: Other events of 1998; Timeline of Eritrean history

Events in the year 1998 in Eritrea.

== Incumbents ==
- President: Isaias Afewerki

== Events ==
- 26 June – United Nations Security Council resolution 1177 was adopted unanimously and condemned the outbreak of war between the country and Ethiopia and demanded an immediate ceasefire in their border dispute.
