= 2010 in Eritrea =

- Decades: 1990s; 2000s; 2010s; 2020s
- See also: Other events of 2010; Timeline of Eritrean history

Events in the year 2010 in Eritrea.

== Incumbents ==
- President: Isaias Afewerki

== Events ==
- 1 January – An armed skirmish occurs between the country's soldiers and the army of Ethiopia near the border town of Zalambesa, Eritrea.
