= 1997 in Eritrea =

- Decades: 1970s; 1980s; 1990s; 2000s; 2010s
- See also: Other events of 1997; Timeline of Eritrean history

Events in the year 1997 in Eritrea.

== Incumbents ==
- President: Isaias Afewerki

== Events ==
- A revised version of the Constitution of Eritrea was introduced to the National Assembly.
