= 2011 in Eritrea =

- Decades: 1990s; 2000s; 2010s; 2020s
- See also: Other events of 2011; Timeline of Eritrean history

Events in the year 2011 in Eritrea.

== Incumbents ==
- President: Isaias Afewerki

== Events ==
- 12 June – The Nabro stratovolcano in the Southern Red Sea Region begins to erupts.
