= 2006 in Eritrea =

- Decades: 1980s; 1990s; 2000s; 2010s; 2020s
- See also: Other events of 2006; Timeline of Eritrean history

Events in the year 2006 in Eritrea.

== Incumbents ==
- President: Isaias Afewerki

== Events ==
- March 14 – United Nations Security Council Resolution 1661 was adopted unanimously and extended the mandate of the United Nations Mission in Ethiopia and Eritrea (UNMEE) for a period of one month until April 15, 2006.
