= 2000 in Eritrea =

- Decades: 1980s; 1990s; 2000s; 2010s; 2020s
- See also: Other events of 2000; Timeline of Eritrean history

Events in the year 2000 in Eritrea.

== Incumbents ==
- President: Isaias Afewerki

== Events ==
- 12 May – United Nations Security Council resolution 1297 was adopted unanimously and demanded an immediate end to hostilities between the country and Ethiopia.
