= Popular Forces of Liberation =

Popular Forces of Liberation may refer to:

- Fuerzas Populares de Liberación Farabundo Martí in El Salvador
- Popular Liberation Forces in Eritrea
