= 1995 in Eritrea =

- Decades: 1970s; 1980s; 1990s; 2000s; 2010s
- See also: Other events of 1995; Timeline of Eritrean history

Events in the year 1995 in Eritrea.

== Incumbents ==
- President: Isaias Afewerki

== Events ==
- 15 – 17 December – The Hanish Islands conflict was fought between the country and Yemen over the island of Greater Hanish in the Red Sea.

== Sources ==
- Lefebvre, Jeffrey A. (Summer 1998), "Red Sea Security And The Geopolitical-Economy of The Hanish Islands Dispute", Middle East Journal, 52 (3)
- Younis, Saleh AA (14 December 2004), "The Lessons of Yemen", Saudi Gazette, archived from the original on 28 September 2007
