= PGE =

PGE may refer to:

- Pacific Gas and Electric Company, commonly abbreviated PG&E
- Pacific Gas & Electric (band), an American blues rock band
- Pacific Great Eastern Railway, the original name of BC Rail
- Parser Grammar Engine, Perl 6 rule compiler/interpreter for the Parrot virtual machine
- Platinum group element
- Polska Grupa Energetyczna
- Portland General Electric
  - PGE Park
- Programme Grande École, a French master's degree diploma
- Propylene glycol ether
- Prostaglandin E
- Provisional Government of Eritrea
