= 1993 in Eritrea =

- Decades: 1970s; 1980s; 1990s; 2000s; 2010s
- See also: Other events of 1993; Timeline of Eritrean history

Events in the year 1993 in Eritrea.

== Incumbents ==
- President: Isaias Afewerki

== Events ==
- 23 – 25 April – An independence referendum was held in the country, which was at the time a part of Ethiopia. The result was 99.83% in favour of independence with a 98.5% turnout.
- 27 April – The country declared its independence from Ethiopia.
