= Orders, decorations, and medals of United Arab Emirates =

This is a list of orders, decorations, and medals of United Arab Emirates in order of precedence.

== Civil Orders ==
Name	Notes
Order of Zayed	Highest civil decoration
Order of the Union	Established in December 1971. Also known as the Order of the Federation.
Order of Independence	Awarded to prominent figures and foreign diplomats.
Order Al-Nahyan	Established in 1969 as a personal honor of the House of Nahyan.

== Military awards of the United Arab Emirates Armed Forces ==
Name	Description
Military Order of Zayed bin Sultan Al Nahyan	Highest ranking distinction
Order of Military Glory	Instituted in 1990 and 2001.
Emirates Military Order	
Distinguished Service Medal	
Wound Medal	
Long Service and Good Conduct Medal	
