= Popular Liberation Forces =

The Popular Liberation Forces (PLF) was a splinter group of the Eritrean Liberation Front (ELF). The group was based in the highland and lowland regions of Eritrea, and was split in two factions. The lowland based faction in the coastal regions of Eritrea, under the command of Ali Said Abdella, was the Shaebia or the Red Sea faction. This organization was largely made up of Muslim lowlanders.

The highland based faction in the highland regions of Eritrea, under the command of Isaias Afewerki, was the Ala faction. The name of this group came about from a mountainous area in southeastern Eritrea which they held their first meeting. This organization was largely made up of Christian highlanders.

Each of the two factions were attacked by the ELF to ensure that the face of Eritrean resistance was monolithic and to mitigate factionalism within the ELF. During the Eritrean Civil Wars, animosity between the PLF's two factions grew. In 1972, these two organizations would come together to merge and create the Eritrean People's Liberation Front.

== See also ==
- History of Eritrea
