= 1994 in Eritrea =

- Decades: 1970s; 1980s; 1990s; 2000s; 2010s
- See also: Other events of 1994; Timeline of Eritrean history

Events in the year 1994 in Eritrea.

== Incumbents ==
- President: Isaias Afewerki

== Events ==
- February – The People's Front for Democracy and Justice (PFDJ) was founded.
