= Bereket Habte Selassie =

Eritrean-American academic and activist

- በረከት ሃብተሰላሴ
- Born: Bereket Habte Selassie; 23 February 1932 (age 94); Adi Nefas, Italian Eritrea
- Education: University of Perugia; University of Hull (LL.B.); University of London (Ph.D, 1965)
- Known for: Politics; Law
- Scientific career
- Fields: Law
- Workplaces: Addis Ababa University; Federal Supreme Court of Ethiopia; Howard University; Georgetown University; World Bank; University of North Carolina at Chapel Hill
- Thesis: Constitutional development in Africa, with a focus on the Executive (1965)

Bereket Habte Selassie is an Eritrean-American scholar on African law and government. He is William E. Leuchtenburg Professor of African and Afro-American Studies at University of North Carolina at Chapel Hill, and he also instructs at the University of North Carolina School of Law. Selassie is an activist for reform in Eritrea and a supporter of pan-Africanism.

== Biography ==
Bereket Habte Selassie graduated from the University of Perugia, studied for his LL.B. at the University of Hull and received a Ph.D from the University of London. He subsequently held numerous high-profile positions within Ethiopia, serving as Attorney General, Associate Justice of Ethiopia’s Supreme Court, Vice Minister of Interior, and Mayor of Harar.

However, Habte Selassie resigned from the government in 1964 out of dissatisfaction with Imperial policies. Several years later, he left Ethiopia, narrowly escaping capture by the military, to join armed guerrillas fighting for Eritrean independence. After spending time on the battlefield, he left the war zone to serve as the representative of the Eritrean People's Liberation Front to the United Nations in New York City.

After Eritrea gained independence, Selassie served as the constitutional commission chair and was the principal author of Eritrea's constitution. He has also served as senior advisor on constitutional reform in the Democratic Republic of the Congo, Nigeria, and Iraq, among others.

Selassie taught at Howard University and Georgetown University, before joining the faculty of University of North Carolina at Chapel Hill. His work in Eritrea has been chronicled through a number of books he has authored, including The Making of the Eritrean Constitution: The Dialectic of Process and Substance (2003), The Crown and The Pen: The Memoirs of a Lawyer Turned Rebel (2007), and Wounded Nation: How a Once Promising Eritrea Was Betrayed and Its Future Compromised (2010).

Among several Eritrean opposition groups, Selassie is viewed as a force for progressive change, free speech, and an alternative to the government of Isaias Afewerki in Eritrea. However, he is still considered a controversial figure among supporters of the Eritrean government, who describe him as an opportunist, Ethiopian loyalist, and someone who lacks affection for Eritrea.
