= Order of Zayed =

Highest state decoration of UAE

Order of Zayed وسام زايد
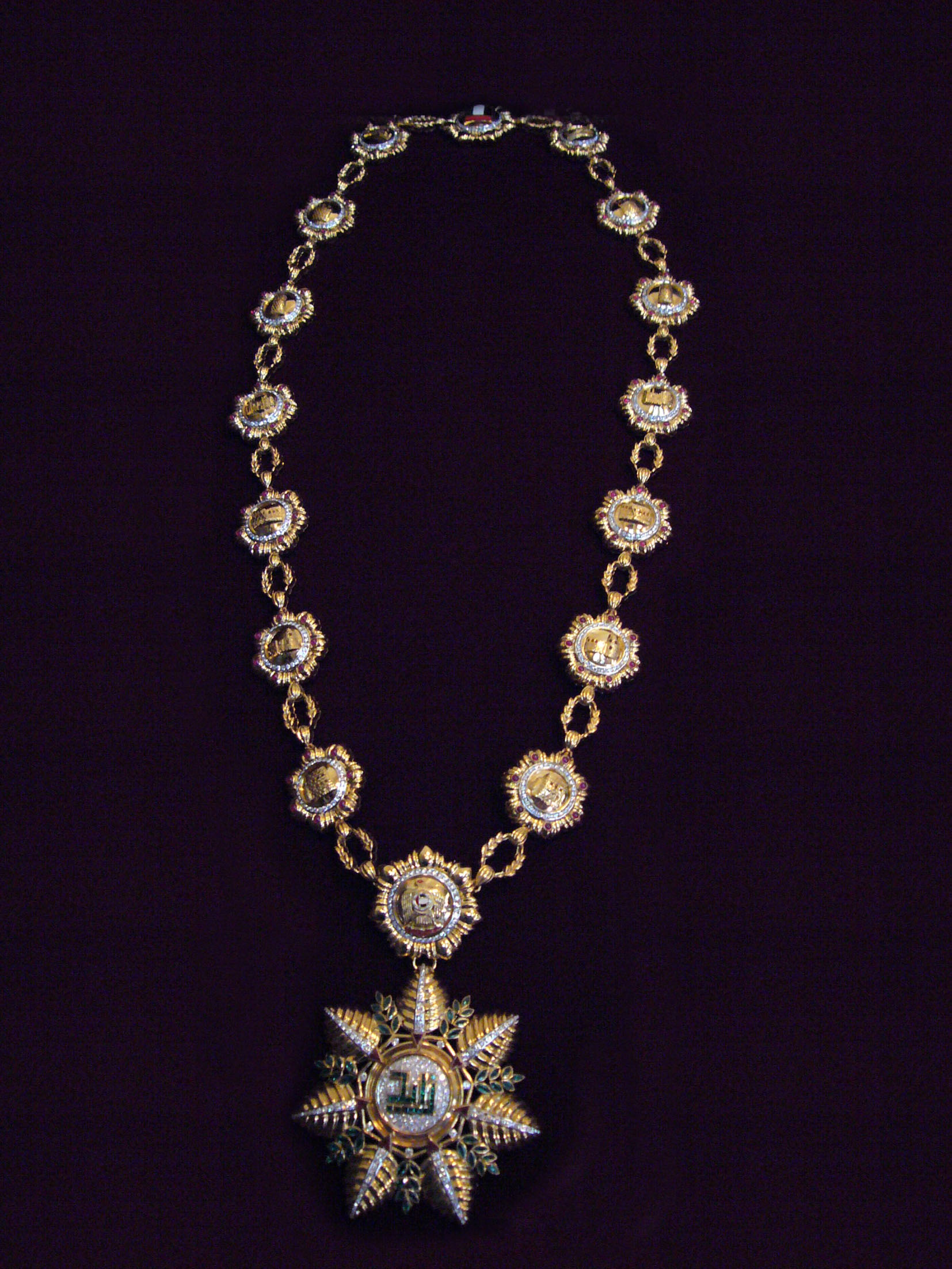

Awarded by the President of the United Arab Emirates
- Type: Order
- Established: 15 August 1987
- Country: United Arab Emirates
- Eligibility: UAE citizens and foreign nationals
- Awarded for: building relationships between countries
- Status: Active
- Founder: Government of the United Arab Emirates
- Grades: 1
- Website: Official website

Precedence
- Next (higher): None
- Next (lower): Order of Zayed II
- Ribbon bar of the order

The Order of Zayed (Arabic: وسام زايد) is the highest civil decoration given by the United Arab Emirates. It is named after the first president of the UAE, Zayed bin Sultan Al Nahyan. The award is intended to be given to a head of state or a king.

== Order necklace ==
The Order is a necklace made of pure gold, featuring an elaborate design that reflects luxury and appreciation. The main medal bears the name “Zayed”, the founder of the United Arab Emirates, surrounded by decorative details that express the cultural and heritage character of the Emirates. The necklace consists of a ring engraved with the flag of the United Arab Emirates and another ring engraved with the official emblem of the country, in addition to 14 other rings decorated with the most important historical and cultural landmarks in the country.

== Recipients ==
Date	Recipient	Role	Country	References
23 January 1995	Naruhito, Crown Prince of Japan	Crown Prince	Japan	
27 November 2003	Sepp Blatter	President of FIFA	Switzerland	
22 February 2004	Abdoulaye Wade	President of Senegal	Senegal	
13 June 2004	Sheikh Tamim bin Hamad Al Thani	Emir of Qatar	Qatar	
2 February 2005	Hamad bin Isa Al Khalifa	King of Bahrain	Bahrain	
13 March 2006	Sheikh Sabah Al-Ahmad Al-Jaber Al-Sabah	Emir of Kuwait	Kuwait	
25 January 2007	Pervez Musharraf	President of Pakistan	Pakistan	
29 January 2007	Sheikh Nawaf Al-Ahmad Al-Jaber Al-Sabah	Crown Prince of Kuwait	Kuwait	
30 January 2007	Ali Abdullah Saleh	President of Yemen	Yemen	
26 August 2007	Gurbanguly Berdimuhamedow	President of Turkmenistan	Turkmenistan	
10 September 2007	Vladimir Putin	President of Russia	Russia	
13 January 2008	George W. Bush	President of the United States	United States	
31 May 2008	Bashar al-Assad	President of Syria	Syria	
10 February 2009	Michel Suleiman	President of Lebanon	Lebanon	
17 March 2009	Nursultan Nazarbaev	President of Kazakhstan	Kazakhstan	
26 May 2010	Angela Merkel	Chancellor of Germany	Germany	
25 November 2010	Elizabeth II	Queen	UK	
14 March 2011	Lee Myung-bak	President of South Korea	South Korea	
2 December 2012	Sheikh Mohammed bin Rashid Al Maktoum	Ruler of Dubai	UAE	
2 December 2012	Sultan bin Muhammad Al-Qasimi	Ruler of Sharjah	UAE	
6 May 2015	Mohammed VI	King of Morocco	Morocco	
3 December 2016	Salman bin Abdulaziz Al Saud	King of Saudi Arabia	Saudi Arabia	
20 July 2018	Xi Jinping	President of China	China	
24 July 2018	Abiy Ahmed	Prime Minister of Ethiopia	Ethiopia	
24 July 2018	Isaias Afwerki	President of Eritrea	Eritrea	
24 August 2019	Narendra Modi	Prime Minister of India	India	
14 November 2019	Abdel Fattah el-Sisi	President of Egypt	Egypt	
7 December 2021	Mohammed bin Salman Al Saud	Crown Prince of Saudi Arabia	Saudi Arabia	
18 July 2022	Emmanuel Macron	President of France	France	
27 September 2022	Haitham bin Tariq	Sultan & Prime Minister of Oman	Oman	
19 July 2023	Recep Tayyip Erdoğan	President of Turkey	Turkey	
1 November 2023	Abdullah II	King of Jordan	Jordan	
5 March 2024	Mishal Al-Ahmad Al-Jaber Al-Sabah	Emir of Kuwait	Kuwait	
13 May 2024	Prabowo Subianto	Minister of Defence	Indonesia	
22 May 2024	Fatih Birol	Executive Director of the IEA	Turkey	
17 July 2024	Joko Widodo	President of Indonesia	Indonesia	
23 February 2025	Sergio Mattarella	President of Italy	Italy	
15 May 2025	Donald Trump	President of the United States	USA	
13 January 2026	Edi Rama	Prime Minister of Albania	Albania	
