= Provisional Government of Eritrea (1991–1993) =

Provisional government in Eritrea between 1991 and 1993

Provisional Government of Eritrea (1991–1993) Government of Eritrea (1992–1993)
- 1991–1993
- Flag of the EPLF
- Status: De facto independent state
- Secretary-General
  - 1991–1993: Isaias Afwerki
- Establishment: Eritrean War of Independence
- History
  - Established: 24 May 1991
  - Disestablished; State of Eritrea established: 24 May 1993

The Provisional Government of Eritrea, from 1992 also called Government of Eritrea was a de facto independent state from 1991 until 1993.
