= 1993 Eritrean independence referendum =

- 23–25 April 1993
- Do you approve that Eritrea should become an independent sovereign state?

Results
| Choice | Votes | % |
|---|---|---|
| Yes | 1,100,260 | 99.83% |
| No | 1,822 | 0.17% |
| Valid votes | 1,102,082 | 99.97% |
| Invalid or blank votes | 328 | 0.03% |
| Total votes | 1,102,410 | 100.00% |
| Registered voters/turnout | 1,173,706 | 93.93% |

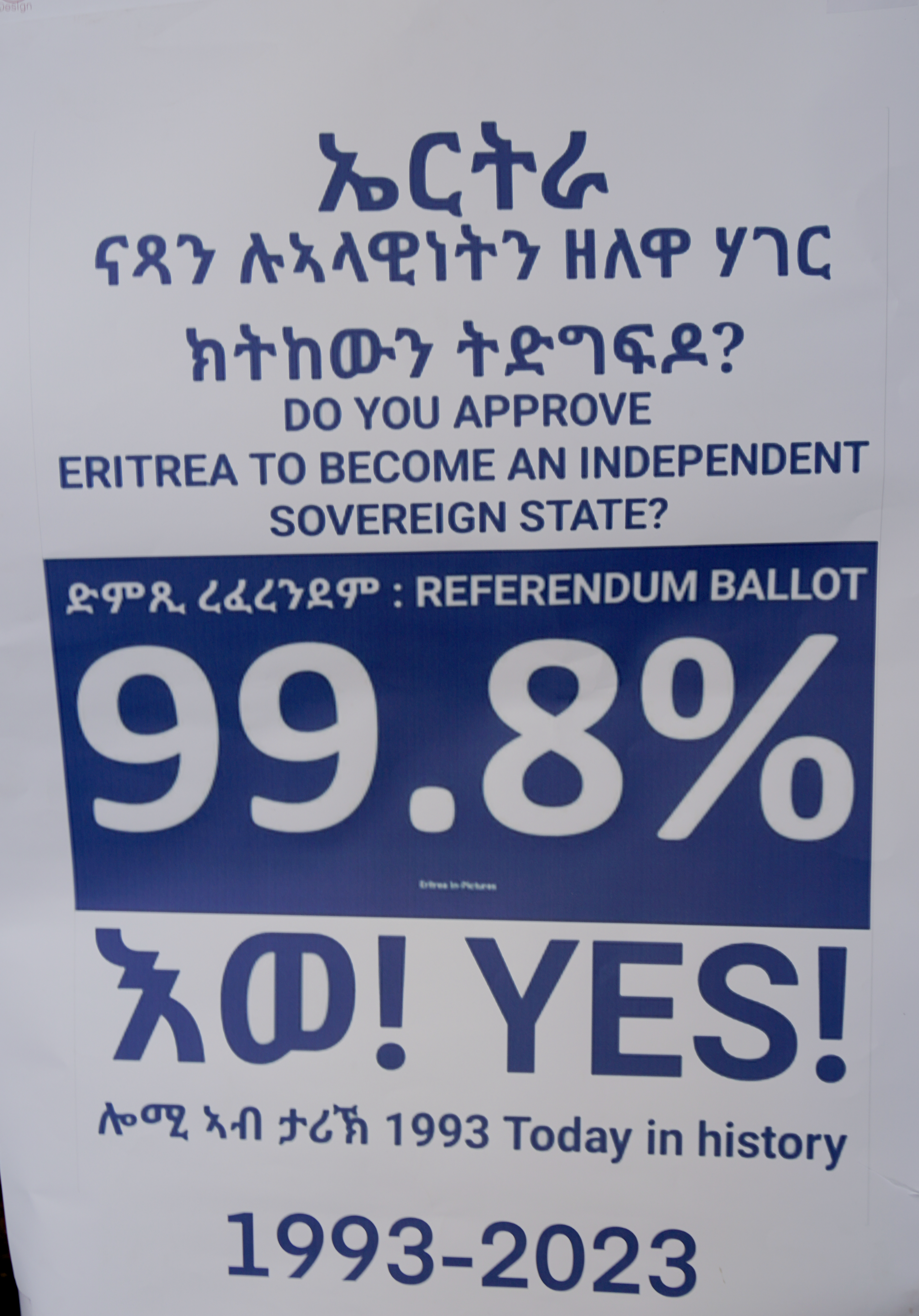
Sign commemorating the referendum

An independence referendum was held in Eritrea, at the time part of Ethiopia, between 23 and 25 April 1993. The result was 99.83% in favour, with a turnout in excess of 98%. Independence from Ethiopia was declared on 27 April 1993.

== History ==
=== Eritrean War of Independence (1961-1991) ===
Eritrea had come under Italian colonial rule in 1890, and remained an Italian colony until the end of World War II. After the war, Italy relinquished their claims to Eritrea, with the British taking over its administration. In 1950, the United Nations voted to combine Eritrea with the independent nation of Ethiopia. The resulting country, the Federation of Ethiopia and Eritrea, was intended to be a federation that retained some Eritrean autonomy. However, by 1962, Ethiopian Emperor Haile Selassie had eliminated this autonomy and integrated Eritrea as a province within Ethiopia.

The loss of autonomy, including military occupation of Eritrea by Ethiopian forces, led to a long-term armed rebellion beginning in the early 1960s. The idea of an independence referendum had first been proposed by the EPLF in 1981. After thirty years, the Eritrean War of Independence ended in May 1991, when the Eritrean People's Liberation Front (EPFL) defeated Ethiopian forces to end the military occupation of Eritrea. The EPLF hoped to demonstrate a popular mandate for independence in addition to the military victory. They scheduled a referendum on Eritrean independence for 1993, providing enough time for a well-organized and internationally-verified referendum. The referendum gained international support internationally, including from the United States.

=== Moving from de re to de jure independence (1991-1993) ===
Shortly after the EPFL gained control of the Eritrean capital city of Asmara in May 1991, the Ethiopian People's Revolutionary Democratic Front gained control of the Ethiopian capital of Addis Ababa, leading to the fall of its ruling Derg regime. The new Ethiopian government had been an ally of the EPFL during the Ethiopian Civil War, as part of a broad coalition of rebel groups across Ethiopia.

Representatives of the transitional governments of Ethiopia and Eritrea met twice, in London in May and in Addis Ababa in July, to discuss the future status of Eritrea, including the referendum. In May 1992, the transitional governments presented a plan for the referendum process, to begin in July 1992 and end in April 1993. They requested a United Nations delegation to observe and verify the referendum.

== Referendum ==
=== International observation ===
The United Nations Observer Mission to Verify the Referendum in Eritrea (UNOVER) was established pursuant to General Assembly Resolution 47/114 of 16 December 1992 and lasted until 25 April 1993. The goals of UNOVER were "to observe and to verify the freedom, fairness and impartiality of the entire referendum process". UNOVER observers noted that the political situation in Eritrea ahead of the referendum was surprisingly calm and stable. In total, approximately 100 observers participated in the UNOVER mission. Election observers were also present from the Organization of African Unity, European Community, League of Arab States, and non-aligned countries. A further 2,000 Eritrean observers helped ensure that the voting process was perceived as fair to Eritreans.

=== Process ===
Voter registration for the referendum ran from October 1992 to March 1993. In this time, 1.1 million people were registered to vote, out of an estimated 1.5-1.75 million eligible voters. 860,000 of them were located within Eritrea, with the remainder comprising the Eritrean diaspora in Sudan, Ethiopia, Saudi Arabia and other countries. All Eritreans over the age of 18 years were eligible to vote in the referendum.

A campaign period was held from February to April 1993, immediately ahead of the referendum. Three groups registered to campaign for independence and none registered to campaign against it. This period was accompanied by a civic education campaign about the referendum, including printed voting instructions and posters, and media outreach. Approximately 6,000 polling officials were trained to administer the 1,012 voting stations throughout the country. Voting stations within Eritrea were open from 23 to 25 April, and international voting took place from 16 to 25 April, depending on the country.

The referendum was completed under budget, and was considered free and fair by UNOVER and other observers. Provisional results were announced on 27 April, two days after voting ended. The initial results showed a 99.8% approval of independence with 98.2% of registered voters voting. The United Nations added Eritrea as a member on 28 May 1993.

== Aftermath ==
=== Consequences of the delayed referendum ===
The two-year delay between the practical independence of Eritrea and its official independence had some negative economic consequences, as Eritrea's unclear status limited its ability to obtain international economic aid. EPLF fighters were expected to remain in the army without pay during the pre-referendum period, and were not able to perform other work. However, the delay also allowed time to resolve some contentious issues related to independence, including Eritrean citizenship law and the status of Ethiopians living in Eritrea.

Despite these efforts, relations between Eritrea and Ethiopia quickly strained under the weight of unresolved issues. These issues contributed to a second war between Eritrea and Ethiopia that lasted from 1998 to 2000.

=== Post-independence governance ===
Despite the transparency of the independence referendum, democratic rule in Eritrea quickly tapered off. Isaias Afwerki, as the leader of the EPLF, assumed the presidency of Eritrea. He has not held an election since, and Eritrea has become a dictatorship. A constitution was drafted for Eritrea in 1997, but it was never implemented. Afwerki rules the country without a parliament or independent judiciary, and human rights abuses are rampant, including the arrests and imprisonment of a swath of journalists, student protestors, and reformers beginning in 2001.

=== International consequences ===
Some scholars anticipated that the positive international reception of the Eritrean independence would destabilize other African countries. The Organization of African Unity (or, since 2002, the African Union) had previously treated African countries' borders as settled, despite the fact that had been chosen more for colonial purposes than as reflections of African self-determination. One African state gaining independence from another with the approval of the OAU meant that these borders were no longer sacrosanct. However, South Sudan is the only country to have gained internationally-recognized independence within Africa since 1993.

== Results ==
| Choice | Votes | % |
|---|---|---|
| For | 1,100,260 | 99.83 |
| Against | 1,822 | 0.17 |
| Total | 1,102,082 | 100.00 |
| Valid votes | 1,102,082 | 99.97 |
| Invalid/blank votes | 328 | 0.03 |
| Total votes | 1,102,410 | 100.00 |
| Registered voters/turnout | 1,173,706 | 93.93 |
Source: African Elections Database

=== By area ===
| Area | For | | Against | | Invalid | Total |
| Area | Votes | % | Votes | % | Invalid | Total |
|---|---|---|---|---|---|---|
| Asmara | 128,443 | 99.89 | 144 | 0.11 | 33 | 128,620 |
| Barka | 44,425 | 99.89 | 47 | 0.11 | 0 | 44,472 |
| Denkalia | 25,907 | 99.65 | 91 | 0.35 | 29 | 26,027 |
| Gash-Setit | 73,236 | 99.63 | 270 | 0.37 | 0 | 73,506 |
| Hamasien | 76,654 | 99.92 | 59 | 0.08 | 3 | 76,716 |
| Akkele Guzay | 92,465 | 99.84 | 147 | 0.16 | 22 | 92,634 |
| Sahel | 51,015 | 99.72 | 141 | 0.28 | 31 | 51,187 |
| Semhar | 33,596 | 99.66 | 113 | 0.34 | 41 | 33,750 |
| Seraye | 124,725 | 99.94 | 72 | 0.06 | 12 | 124,809 |
| Senhit | 78,513 | 99.97 | 26 | 0.03 | 1 | 78,540 |
| Freedom fighters | 77,512 | 99.97 | 21 | 0.03 | 46 | 77,579 |
| Sudan | 153,706 | 99.77 | 352 | 0.23 | 0 | 154,058 |
| Ethiopia | 57,466 | 99.65 | 204 | 0.35 | 36 | 57,706 |
| Other | 82,597 | 99.84 | 135 | 0.16 | 74 | 82,806 |
| Total | 1,100,260 | 99.83 | 1,822 | 0.17 | 328 | 1,102,410 |
Source: Eritrea: Birth of a Nation

== See also ==
- Eritrean War of Independence
