= List of heads of state of Eritrea =

President of the State of Eritrea
- ፕረዚደንት ሃገረ ኤርትራ (Tigrinya)
- Presidential standard

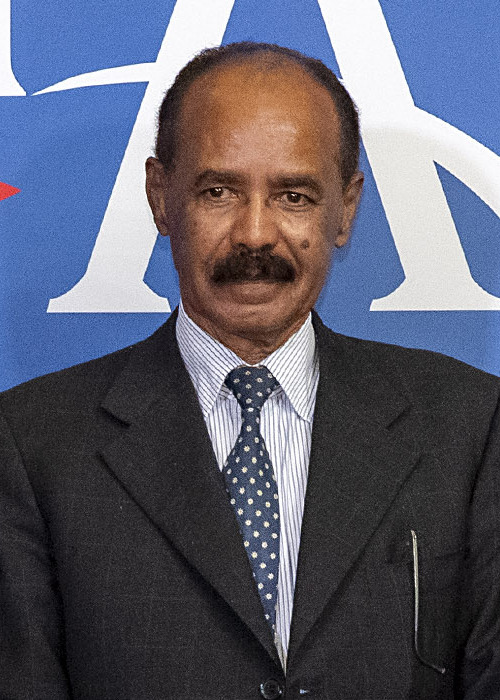
- Incumbent; Isaias Afwerki since 24 May 1993
- Executive branch of the Eritrean Government
- Style: His Excellency
- Residence: President's Office, Asmara
- Appointer: National Assembly†
- Term length: Five years, renewable once†
- Constituting instrument: Constitution of Eritrea (1997)
- Inaugural holder: Isaias Afwerki
- Formation: 24 May 1993; 33 years ago
- Deputy: Chairman of the National Assembly (de jure)
- Salary: Nfk 90,000 / US$6,000 annually
- †: As the Constitution of Eritrea has to date never been implemented, elections have never been held and the incumbent has remained in office without being bound by fixed terms.

Since the establishment of the office of president in 1993, the head of state of Eritrea has been Isaias Afwerki. The president is also the head of government of Eritrea, as well as commander-in-chief of the Eritrean Defence Forces.

As of 2021, there are no term limits for the president in the Constitution of Eritrea.

The list also includes the secretary-general of the Provisional Government of Eritrea, who acted as head of state between 1991 and 1993, before the proclamation of independence.

== List of officeholders ==
Political parties

Eritrean People's Liberation Front (EPLF)
People's Front for Democracy and Justice (PFDJ)

No.	Portrait	Name (Birth–Death)	Term of office			Political party	Ref.
No.	Portrait	Name (Birth–Death)	Took office	Left office	Time in office	Political party	Ref.
• Provisional Government of Eritrea (1991–1993) •
1		Isaias Afwerki (born 1946); Secretary-General	24 May 1991	24 May 1993	2 years	EPLF	
• State of Eritrea (1993–present) •
1		Isaias Afwerki (born 1946); President (Note: Also Chairman of the National Assembly.)	24 May 1993	Incumbent	33 years, 175 days	PFDJ	

== See also ==
- Politics of Eritrea
- History of Eritrea
  - List of colonial governors of Eritrea
