= Isaias Afwerki =

President of Eritrea since 1993

His Excellency Isaias Afwerki
- ኢሳይያስ ኣፍወርቂ
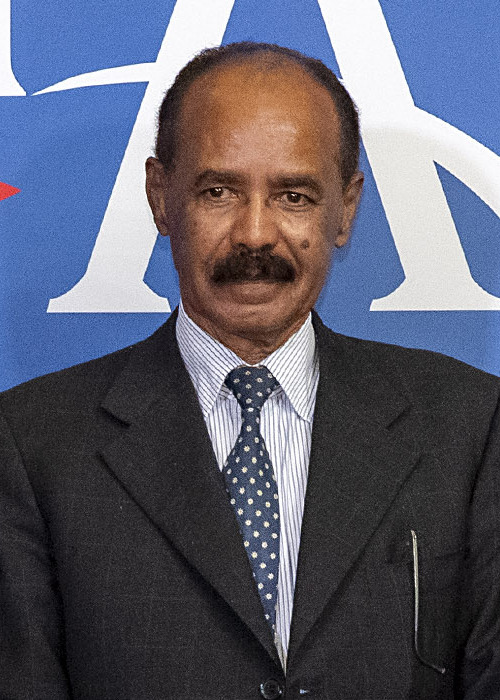
- Isaias in 2024

1st President of Eritrea
- Incumbent
- Assumed office 24 May 1993
- Preceded by: Office established

1st President of the National Assembly of Eritrea
- Incumbent
- Assumed office 24 May 1993
- Preceded by: Office established

1st Chairman of the People's Front for Democracy and Justice
- Incumbent
- Assumed office 16 February 1994
- Preceded by: Party established

1st Secretary-General of the Provisional Government of Eritrea
- In office 24 May 1991 – 24 May 1993
- Preceded by: Office established
- Succeeded by: Office abolished

2nd Leader of the Eritrean People's Liberation Front
- In office 12 January 1987 – 16 February 1994
- Preceded by: Romodan Mohammed Nur
- Succeeded by: Party dissolved

Personal details
- Born: 2 February 1946 (age 80) Asmara, Eritrea
- Party: People's Front for Democracy and Justice (since 1994)
- Other political affiliations: Eritrean People's Liberation Front (1987–1994)
- Spouse: Saba Hailu
- Children: 3
- Education: Addis Ababa University (dropped out)

Military service
- Allegiance: ELF (1967–1970); EPLF (1970–1994); Eritrea (1994–Present)
- Years of service: 1967–1991
- Battles/wars: Conflicts: Eritrean War of Independence; Eritrean Ethiopian War; Tigray War

Isaias Afwerki (Note: His name has also been romanized as Isaias Afewerki and Isaias Afworki. According to Google Ngram, the spelling Afwerki has consistently seen the greatest usage, followed by Afewerki and then Afworki. Additionally, Isaias took part in a forum discussion in 2000 hosted by The Washington Post, wherein the spelling Afwerki was consistently used.) (Tigrinya: ኢሳይያስ ኣፍወርቂ, pronounced [isajas afwɐrkʼi], /ɪˈsɑːjəs ˈɑːfwɜːrki/; born 2 February 1946) is an Eritrean politician who has served as the president and dictator of Eritrea since its independence in 1993 and the chairman of the People's Front for Democracy and Justice (PFDJ) since 1994.

Isaias joined the pro-independence Eritrean Liberation Front in 1967 and quickly rose through the ranks to become its leader in 1970, before defecting to form the Eritrean People's Liberation Front (EPLF). Having consolidated power within this group, he led pro-independence forces to victory on 24 May 1991, ending the 30-year-old war for independence from Ethiopia, before being elected president of the newly founded country of Eritrea two years later.

Western scholars and historians have long considered Isaias to be a totalitarian leader, with Eritrea's constitution remaining unenforced, electoral institutions effectively being nonexistent, and a policy of mass conscription. The United Nations and human rights organizations such as Amnesty International and Freedom House have cited him for human rights violations. Since 2024, Reporters Without Borders has ranked Eritrea, under the government of Isaias, last out of 180 countries in its World Press Freedom Index, lower than North Korea and China.

== Early life and education ==
Isaias Afwerki was born on 2 February 1946 in the Aba Shi'Aul district of Asmara, Eritrea (then under British administration). His father, whose native village was Tselot, just outside of Asmara, was a minor functionary in the state tobacco monopoly; his mother was a housewife.

Isaias spent most of his youth in Asmara. He attended Prince Makonnen High School (now called Asmara Secondary School) where he engaged in discussions about nationalist Eritrean politics. In 1965, he began his studies at the College of Engineering at Haile Selassie I University (now called Addis Ababa University) in Addis Ababa, Ethiopia, but due to lower scores in his first-year first semester he was supposed to retake the first semester which he didn't. However, he maintained his interest in Eritrean politics and informed his friends that he was planning to join the Eritrean rebels in the field.

== Eritrean War of Independence ==
In September 1966, Isaias, along with Haile Woldense and Mussie Tesfamichael, traveled to Kassala, Sudan, via Asmara to join the Eritrean Liberation Front (ELF). Isaias and his comrades had assumed the ELF was an inclusive revolutionary organization, but they soon realized that the movement was sectarian and generally hostile to Christians. Isaias, Haile, and Mussie decided to organize subversively, forming a secret clandestine cell. To seal their pact, the three men signed an oath with their own blood, carving an 'E' on their right arms, symbolizing their determination to die for Eritrea. In 1967, the Chinese government took in five ELF recruits for political commissar training, including Isaias. There, he studied Maoism as well as the strategy and tactics of guerrilla warfare. On his return trip, he was arrested by Saudi Arabian authorities while attempting to cross the Red Sea on a dhow. He was released nearly six months later.

Upon his return in 1968, Isaias was appointed as a political commissioner of the ELF's Zone 5 in the Dekibarek region. He and other ELF members began to criticize the sectarian tendencies of the ELF. In 1969, further power struggles among the ELF leadership and the assassination of several Christian members led to the defection of the ELF's Zone 5, which included Isaias. This group of around seventy fighters, led by Abraham Tewolde, withdrew to an isolated locality, Ala, in the northeast of the Akele Guzay near Dekemhare, where they were joined by another small contingent of Kebessa fighters under Mesfin Hagos, together they became known as the Ala group. Following Tewolde's death in late 1970, Isaias became the leader of the group.

In August 1971, this group of Christian defectors held a meeting at Tekli (northern Red Sea) and founded the Selfi Natsinet (“Independence Party“). They elected a leadership consisting of Isaias, Mesfin Hagos, Tewolde Eyob, Solomon Woldemariam, and Asmerom Gerezgiher. They then issued a highly polemical document written by Isaias called, Nihnan Elamanan (“We and Our Goals”), in which they explained the rationale for their decision to create a separate political organization instead of working within the ELF. The document accused the ELF of discriminating against Christian highlanders and killing reformist Christian ELF members. The document instead stressed the unity of the Eritrean nation and called for a "revolutionary organization with a revolutionary line". In August 1971, Selfi Natsinet joined the Popular Liberation Forces (PLF), forming a loose alliance with two other splinter groups; these three groups were jointly represented by Osman Saleh Sabbe.

In February 1972, the ELF declared war on the PLF, resulting in a civil war that would last until 1974. During this time, a significant number of Asmara high school and University of Addis Ababa students were recruited, which resulted in the Selfi Natsinet becoming the most powerful group within the PLF. A major crisis occurred when the Obel faction, led by the former Sudanese army NCO Abu Tayyara, left the group in April 1973. Isaias then called for a more unified administration and military force, which led to the emergence of the Eritrean People's Liberation Front (EPLF) in August 1973. Internal agitation soon arose when the Marxist faction, led by his old friend Mussie Tesfamichael, called for more radical policies and began to accuse the movement of being too authoritarian. Isaias denounced his rivals in a publication and mobilized his supporters to arrest Mussie and other colleagues. After a brief trial, all eleven EPLF leaders, including Mussie, were executed on 11 August 1974. In 1977, EPLF held its first congress, at which Isaias was elected vice-secretary general.

Although Isaias had to initially share power with others who led the EPLF, by the early 1980s, he was able to transform it into the movement he envisioned. The EPLF became a tough nationalist organization controlled by a highly centralized inner party which made all the important decisions. From the mid-1980s, Isaias made a bid to marginalize the political core of the EPLF's founding leadership and pack the political bodies with men unwaveringly loyal to him. This coincided with the second congress of the EPLF in 1987, when he was elevated to the status of secretary-general of the organization. According to Dan Connell, this was approximately when Isaias took unquestioned control of the EPLF. As the leader of the Eritrean struggle against Ethiopian rule, Isaias became the icon of the resistance. In April 1991, the EPLF took Asmara from Ethiopian forces; the following month, they drove out Derg troops in the area. After the Derg was overthrown by the EPRDF on 28 May, Isaias quickly obtained U.S. support for Eritrean independence; in June 1991, his organization announced their desire to hold a United Nations-sponsored referendum.

== Presidency (1993–present) ==
=== Independence of Eritrea ===
In April 1993, a United Nations-supervised referendum on independence was held, and the following month Eritrea achieved de jure independence. Isaias was elected as the president of the State of Eritrea by the National Assembly and declared the first head of state, a position he has held ever since the end of the war for independence.

On 16 February 1994, the EPLF held its third congress, renamed itself the People's Front for Democracy and Justice (PFDJ) as part of its transition to a political party, and Isaias was elected secretary-general by an overwhelming majority of votes. Isaias undertook a series of economic reforms. In May 1994, he implemented a national service program in which individuals would serve for 18 months. Military training was the focus for the first six months, followed by awareness of the country and expansion of its agricultural sector.

=== Domestic policy ===
==== Elections ====
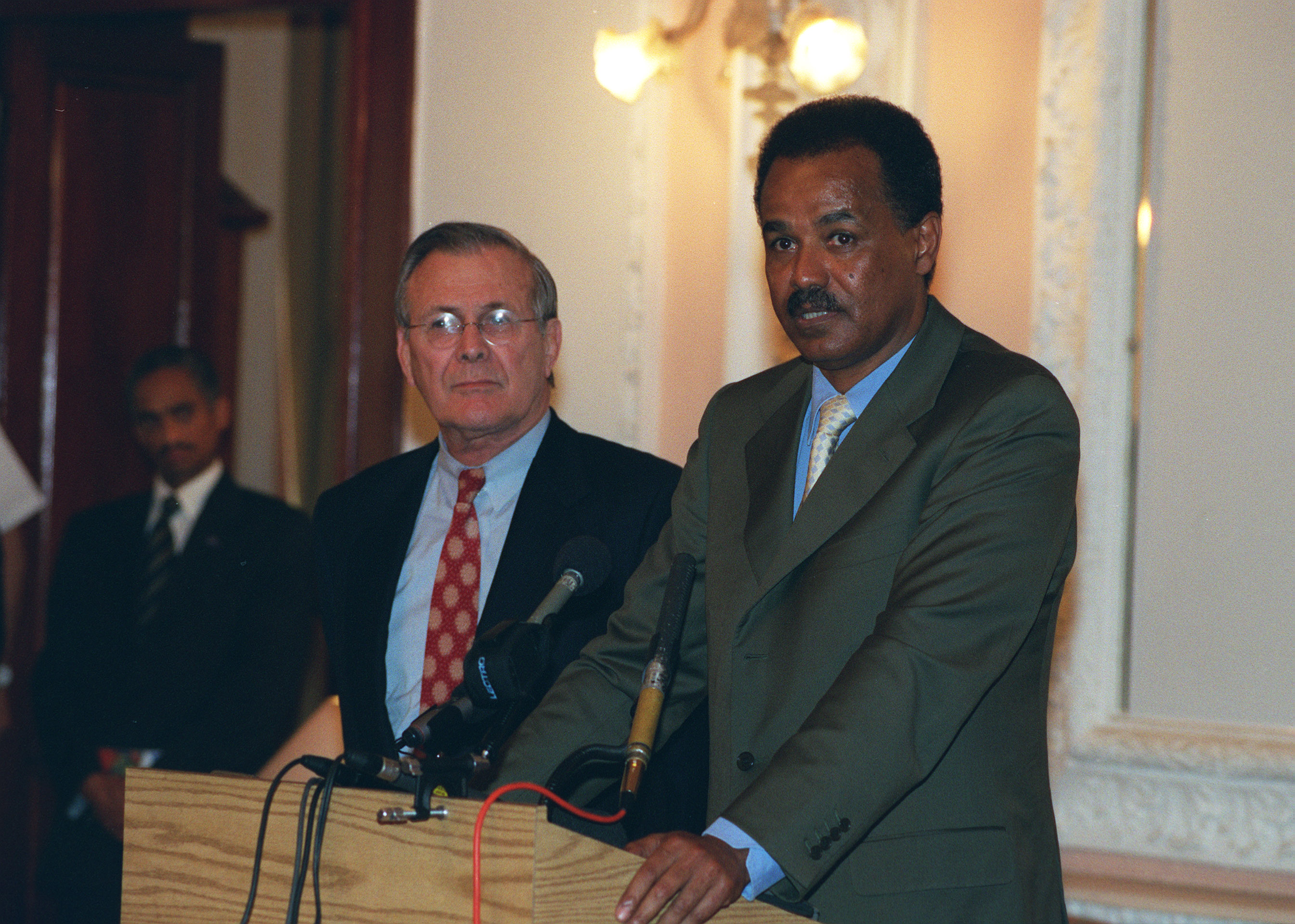
President Isaias with U.S. Secretary of Defense Donald Rumsfeld, December 2002

In his first few years Isaias was hailed as a new type of African president with then-US President Bill Clinton referring to him as a "renaissance African leader". However, in 1997, a new constitution was drawn up but never enacted, and elections were cancelled. In an April 2000 speech at Princeton University, Isaias said that "constitutionality, political pluralism and free and fair elections are naturally the best institutional tools" for achieving economic prosperity given the political and cultural realities of a specific country. However, a parliamentary election scheduled in 2001 was later postponed indefinitely. Although police are responsible for upholding internal security and the armed forces' external security, eyewitness reports exist of the armed forces engaging with demobilizing soldiers or civilian militias to complete the hybrid tasks of both. Civil authorities sometimes involve themselves with security forces in an abuse of power. In 2014, Isaias declared the 1997 constitution to be "dead" and announced plans for a new constitution. However, as of 2026, no new constitution has been proposed.

In 2018, Isaias' former comrade, Andebrhan Welde Giorgis, said that Isaias went on to personalise power, and "having personalised power, he abused it to the maximum". Notwithstanding, during the African Unity summit in Cairo in 1993, Isaias had criticized other leaders for staying in power for too long, and he had also rejected a cult of personality.

In 2001, 15 ministers, later dubbed the G-15, wrote an open letter calling for reform. On 18 September 2001, Afwerki closed all independent national press, and prominent opposition leaders were arrested. 11 of the G-15 were arrested and, as of 2026, have not been released. In 2010, when asked when elections would be held, he responded, "Let's wait 3 or 4 decades".

==== Economics ====
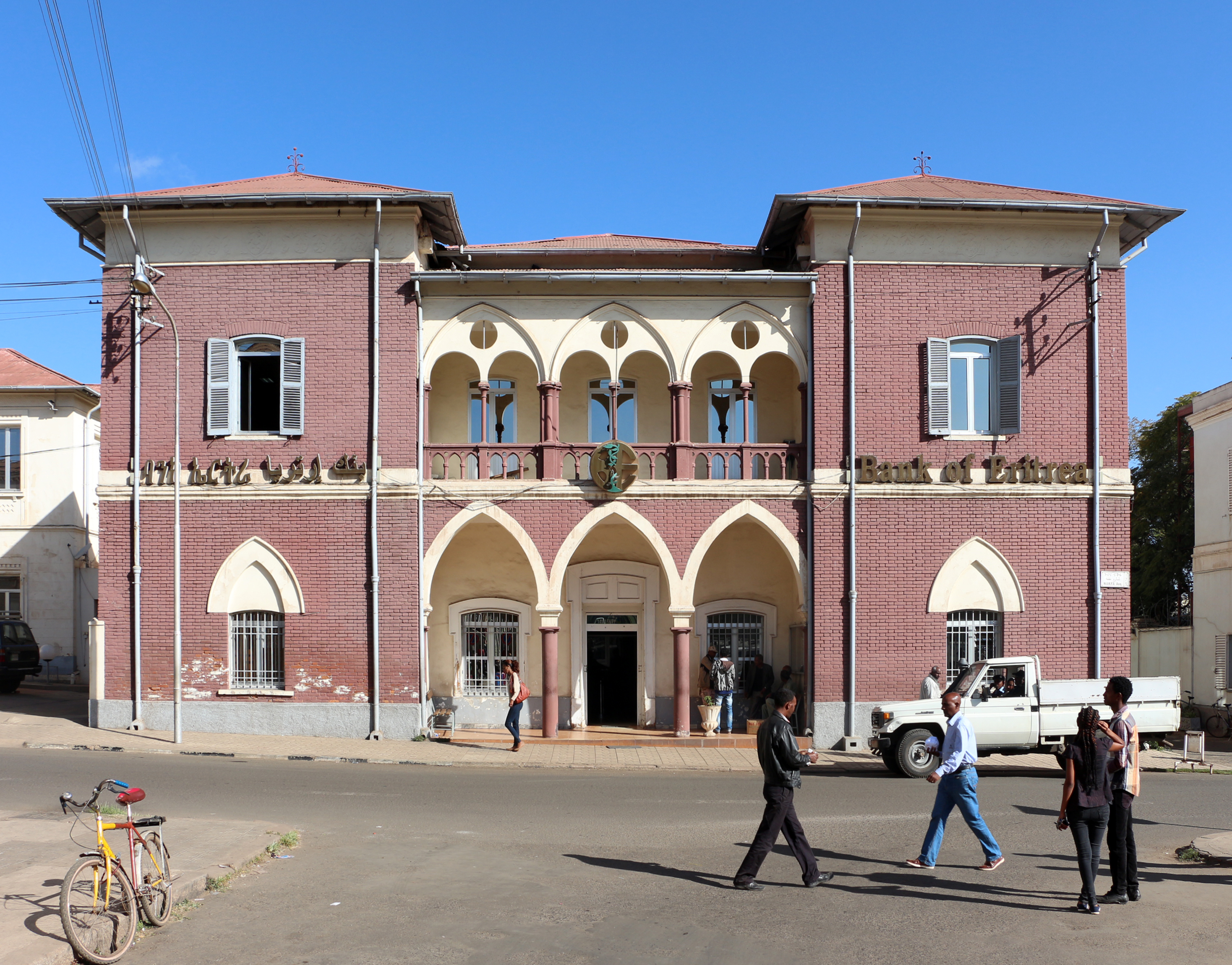
The Bank of Eritrea in 2005

In 2009, Isaias advocated for the development of indigenous political and economic institutions and a strategy that suited Eritrea's internal conditions and available resources. The key elements were to include ambitious infrastructure development campaigns in terms of power, transport, and telecommunications, as well as with basic healthcare and educational facilities.

According to the World Bank, Eritrea's recent growth has been associated with the agricultural (one-third of the economy and 20 percent of gross domestic product (GDP)) and mining sectors (20 percent). Real GDP grew by 12 percent in 2018 but fell 2.7 percent from 2015 to 2018. Deflation existed from 2016 to 2018 due to a currency change and continued in 2018 after economic and trade ties with Ethiopia were reestablished.

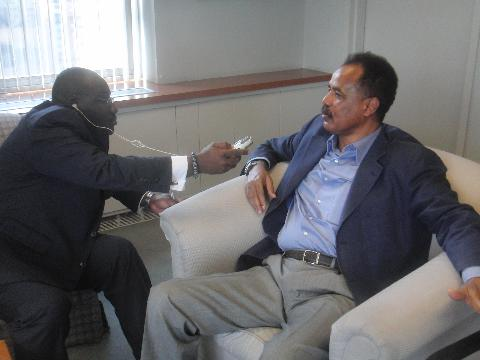
Voice of America's Peter Clottey interviews Isaias in New York, 2011

On 18 May 2012, Isaias said in a VOA interview that the country's development over two decades of independence was "a success story". As a result of regional insecurity in 1998, Eritrea has a strong fiscal policy caused by a sharp drop in capital spending and reductions in revenue. Fiscal pressures, however, are likely to increase.

==== Human rights ====
As of 2013, Amnesty International reported that the government of Isaias imprisoned at least 10,000 political prisoners. Amnesty also claimed that torture—for punishment, interrogation, and coercion—is widespread.

In June 2015, a United Nations panel accused Isaias of leading a totalitarian government responsible for systematic human rights violations in Eritrea that may amount to crimes against humanity. Norwegian academic Kjetil Tronvoll said that concentration camps for individuals from opposition groups and labor camps with makeshift facilities (often made from shipping containers) exist. The government has banned independent newspapers and arrested journalists critical of Isaias since 2001, including G-15: a group of People's Front for Democracy and Justice officials who appealed for an open election. Eritrea is closed to human-rights organizations, who are forced to obtain information from émigrés.

The government has been accused of enforced disappearances; torture; arbitrary detention; censorship; libel; human trafficking; criminalizing same-sex activity; arbitrary and unlawful violations of privacy, judicial independence, freedom of speech, association, movement, and religion; and forced labor (including national service past the 18-month legal obligation). An August 2015 Human Rights Watch (HRW) report documented the use of unlawful force (torture and battery) by security authorities against prisoners, national service evaders, army deserters, asylum seekers without travel documents, and religious groups. In June 2018, a thirty-year-old man reportedly died as a result of torture and delayed medical treatment. He was arrested while attending the burial that March of Hajji Musa Mohammed Nur, director of an Islamic school. Freedom in the World rated Eritrea "not free" in 2022; the country scored one out of 40 for political rights and two out of 60 for civil liberties.

=== Foreign relations ===
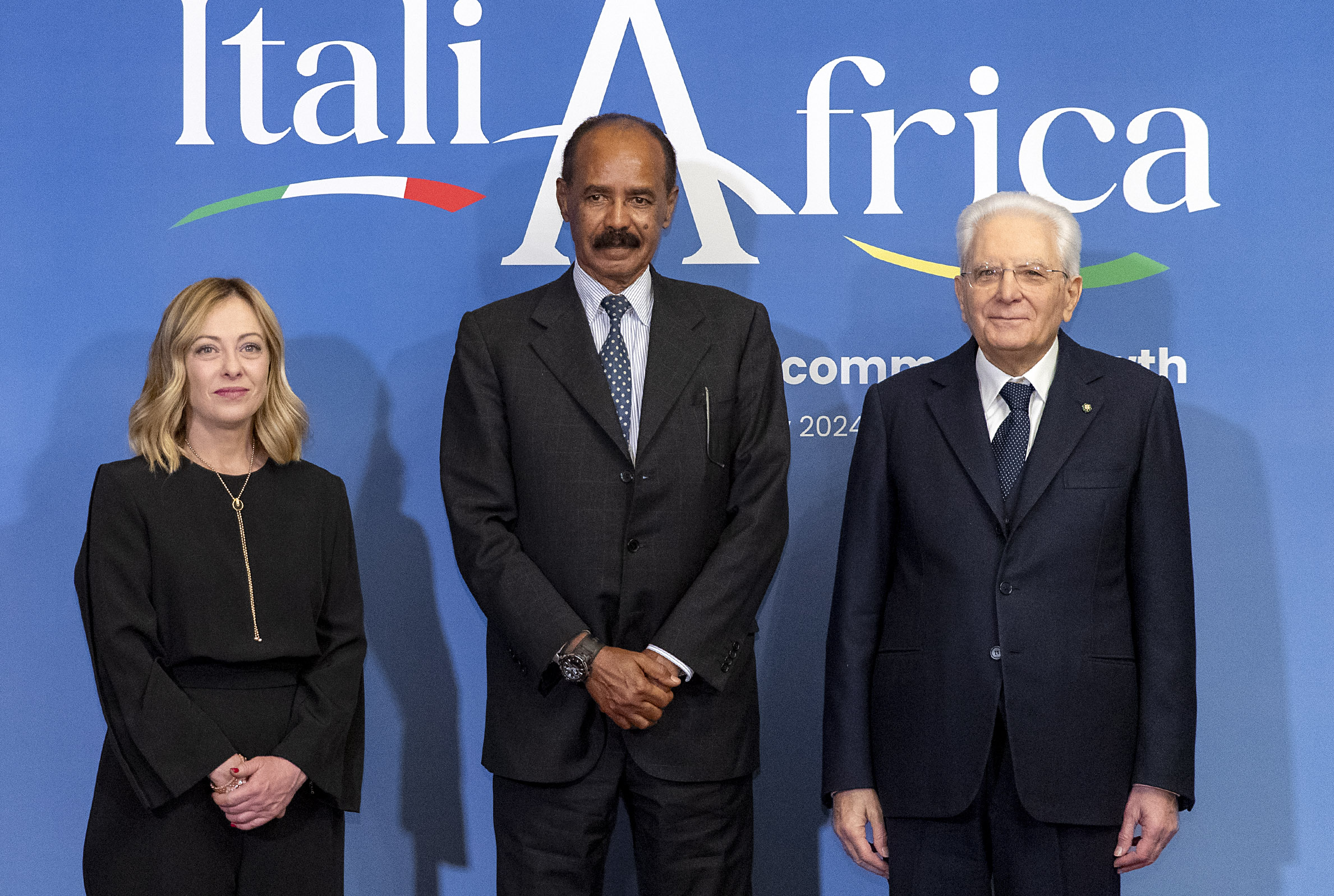
Afwerki with Italian President Sergio Mattarella and Prime Minister Giorgia Meloni at the 2024 Italy–Africa Summit in Rome, 28 January 2024

==== Ethiopia ====
During the Ethiopian Civil War, the Tigray People's Liberation Front (TPLF) was initially inspired by the Eritreans and received assistance for their independence. By the 1980s and 1990s, the TPLF emerged as a powerful rebel group that increased its military skills in the revolutionary struggle. The groups disagreed and broke up in 1985.

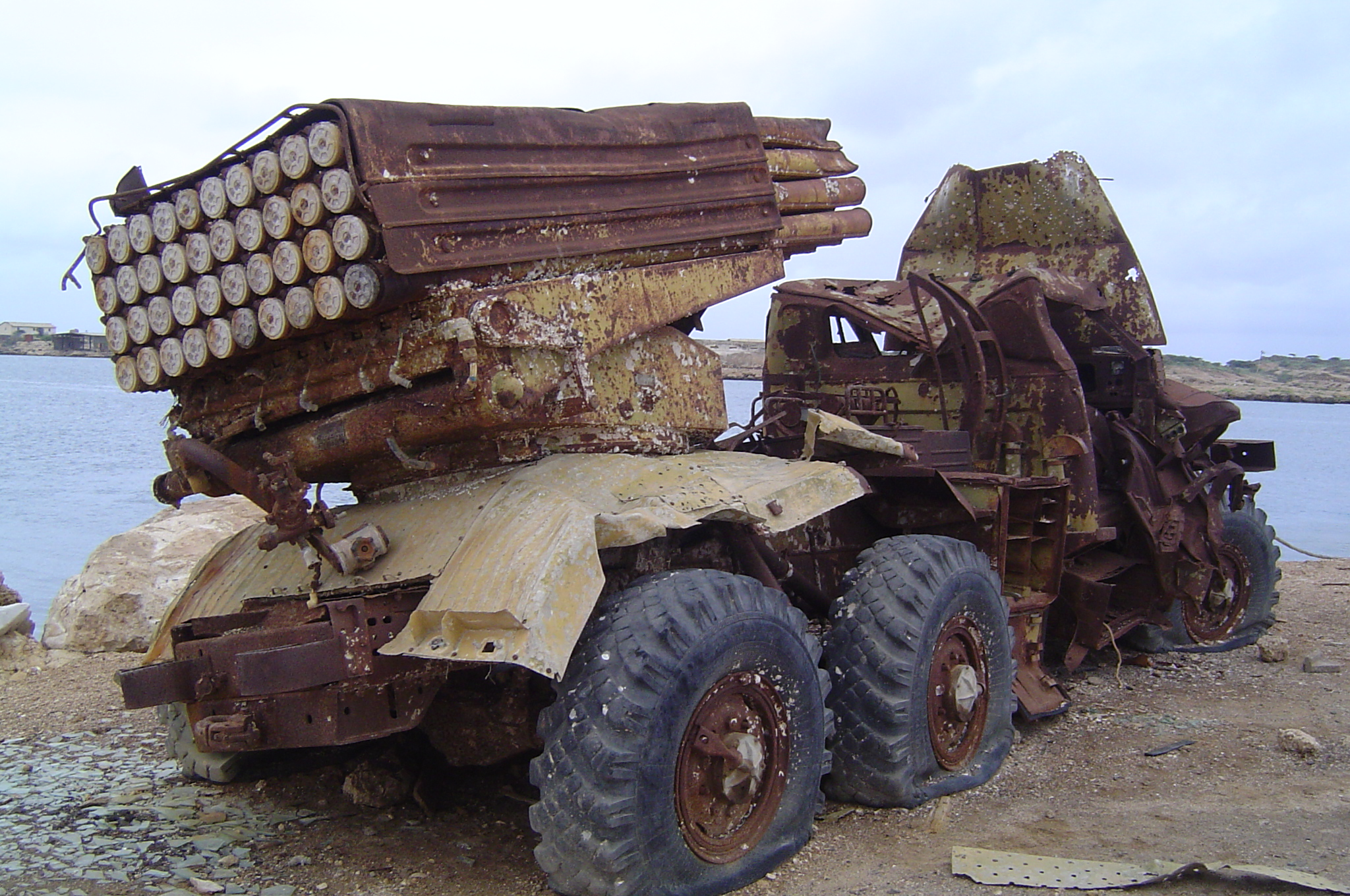
Destroyed BM-21 Grad, a relic of the Eritrean–Ethiopian War (1998–2000)

Eritrea has engaged in border conflicts since its independence, most notably a war between 1998 and 2000. The war began after Eritrea invaded Ethiopia over the disputed border of Badme on 6 May 1998, and resulted in hundreds of thousands of deaths within two years. On 12 December 2000, Eritrea signed the Algiers Agreement to end the war; however, the countries remained in a "no-war-no-peace" stalemate. Eritrea has security concerns about Ethiopia, particularly its support of weak, splintered Eritrean opposition groups. Isaias uses the disputed border to maintain a war footing and justify indefinite mass mobilization and repression. Eritrea supported Ethiopian rebel groups such as the Oromo Liberation Front (OLF) and the Ogaden National Liberation Front (ONLF) to undermine regional Ethiopian influence. In Somalia, Eritrea has trained, armed, and financed militias opposed to the Ethiopian government during its transitional government. The UN Monitoring Group on Somalia recommended an embargo against Eritrea, Ethiopia and other states.

In late 2008, the relationship between the countries was deemed strained; the Ethiopian Border Commission (EEBC) did not outline the border in November 2007. The United Nations Missions in Ethiopia and Eritrea (UNMEE) ended in 2008, and Eritrean troops briefly occupied the Temporary Security Zone. Ethiopia remained in control of the EEBC's border inside Eritrea and reached Badme, triggering mass mobilization and high troop concentrations in the area. Eritrea's unchanged stance reinforced the EEBC's decision, which was backed by international law; Ethiopia remained in de facto compliance and had strong relations with the UN.

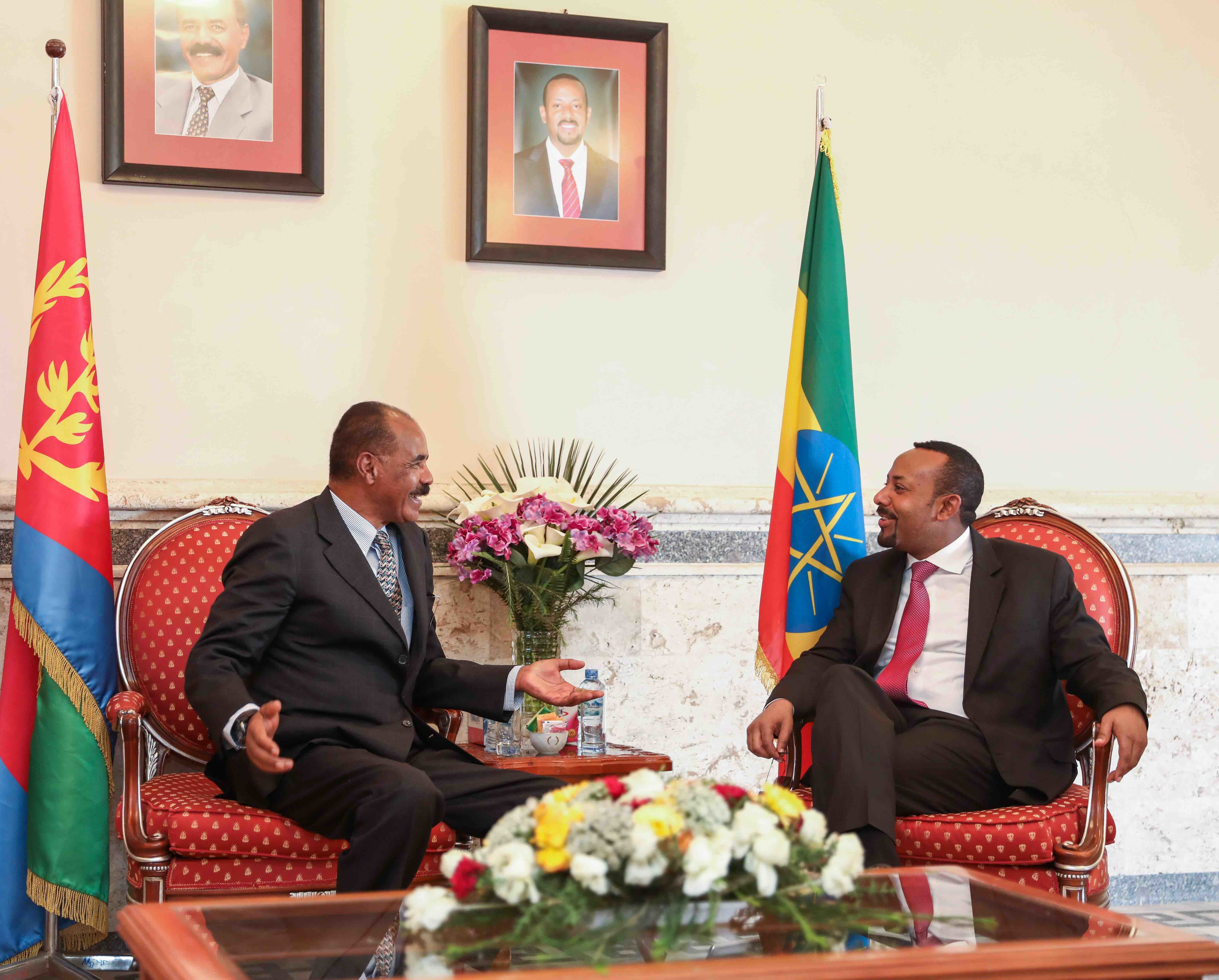
Ethiopian prime minister Abiy Ahmed with Isaias in March 2019

In 2018, Isaias oversaw an unexpected transformation of Eritrea's relations with Ethiopia. The 20-year stalemate ended after Ethiopian Prime Minister Abiy Ahmed came to power in 2018. Abiy signed a "joint declaration of peace and friendship" at a bilateral summit on 9 July, restoring diplomatic and trade ties with Eritrea. The agreement includes reopening Burre to access the landlocked Ethiopian Port of Eritrea and Zalambessa for trade, and access to Ethio telecom and Ethiopian Airlines. On 16 September, Abiy signed another peace treaty with Isaias in Jeddah. Saudi Foreign Minister Adel al-Jubeir tweeted that the agreement "will contribute to strengthening security and stability in the region at large". This was widely acknowledged by numerous world leaders, with the UAE government awarding Isaias the Order of Zayed (First Class) in recognition of his efforts to end the conflict.

After July 2018, the Ethiopian and Eritrean intelligence agencies started a close cooperation. This worried Eritrean refugees in Addis Ababa, some of whom were temporarily detained for three weeks, acquitted by Ethiopian courts, and only released two weeks after their acquittal.

The Tigray war began on 3 November 2020 after the Tigray People's Liberation Front, the former ruling party in Ethiopia, attacked the Northern Command center camps of the Ethiopian National Defense Force (ENDF) in Tigray and pushed them to Eritrea. The Eritrean Defence Forces joined hands with the ENDF and, allegedly with the help of UAE armed drones, counter-attacked the TPLF forces. There was alleged looting in Tigray Region, including systematic, wide-scale looting in Axum following the Axum massacre in late November 2020. After several weeks of Ethiopian government denial of the presence of Eritrean troops in Ethiopia, the Ethiopian prime minister admitted to the presence of Eritrean troops in Ethiopia and agreed to withdraw them. Under international pressure, on 26 March 2021, after a meeting between Ethiopian Prime Minister Abiy Ahmed and Isaias, it was announced that Eritrean troops would withdraw from the Tigray Region.

==== United States ====
As of 7 May 2026, the United States is planning to lift sanctions against Eritrea, reflecting a strategic shift linked to the Red Sea's rising geopolitical importance amid regional tensions and the Iran war. The move aims to improve U.S.-Eritrea relations and send a message to Ethiopia regarding its ambitions for sea access, given the regional instability caused by conflicts in Sudan, Somalia, and Ethiopia.

During a keynote address marking Eritrea's 35th Independence Anniversary on 24 May 2026, Isaias stated that criticism “should not be directed at President Trump alone,” adding that those who “claim to be ‘influential’ and strive to mislead and corner Trump must not be forgotten.” The remarks came amid heightened geopolitical competition in the Horn of Africa and the Red Sea region, where Eritrea has deepened coordination with Egypt and Somalia over regional security and maritime governance, while tensions persisted with Ethiopia over its pursuit of sea access. Despite detractors questioning the trajectory of rapprochement, both Eritrea and the United States continued signaling interest in recalibrating relations within the context of broader Red Sea security realignments.

==== Sudan ====
Relations between Eritrea and Sudan were initially hostile; shortly after independence in 1993, Eritrea charged Sudan with supporting the activities of Eritrean Islamic Jihad, which carried out attacks against the Eritrean government. Eritrea broke relations with Sudan at the end of 1994, became a strong supporter of the Sudan People's Liberation Movement/Sudan People's Liberation Army (SPLA), and permitted the opposition National Democratic Alliance to locate its headquarters in the former Sudan embassy in Asmara.

Relations were later reestablished in December 2005. A year later, Isaias and Sudanese president Omar al-Bashir met for the first time since 2001 in Khartoum. Isaias later described relations with Sudan as resting on solid ground and having "bright prospects." Eritrea played a prominent role in brokering a peace agreement between the Sudanese government and Sudan's Eastern Front.

On 10 May 2014, the state-owned Sudan News Agency announced during Isaias' visit to the Al Jeili oil refinery that Sudan had agreed to supply Eritrea with fuel and boost its economic partnership. It was also reported that the Sudanese Electricity Company planned to supply a 45-kilometre (28 mi) power line from Kassala to the Eritrean town of Teseney. On 4 May 2021, Isaias visited Khartoum to discuss the ongoing border dispute between Ethiopia and Sudan. In conversation with Abdel-Fattah al-Burhan, head of Sudan's Transitional Sovereignty Council, he raised regional issues and the long-time dispute over the Grand Ethiopian Renaissance Dam.

==== Djibouti ====
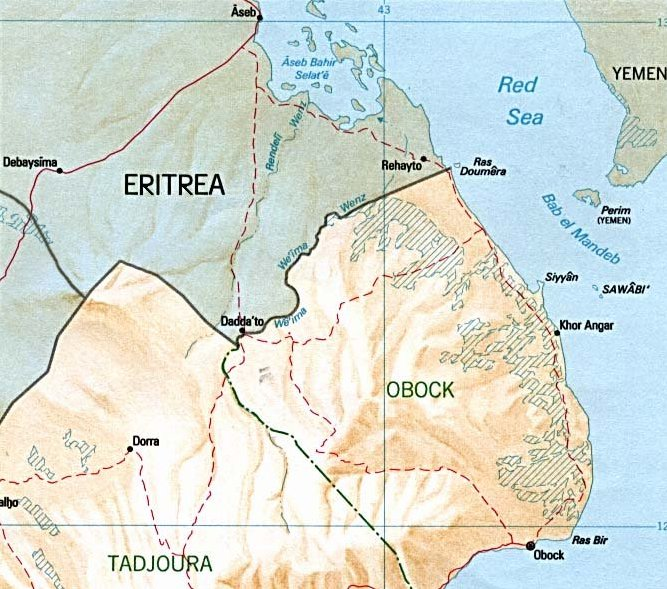
Shaded relief map of Djibouti. The original map is from 1991, with the border between Ethiopia and Eritrea added in 2006.

Relations between Eritrea and Djibouti date back to 1991. The countries waged war in April 1996 when Djibouti accused Eritrea of shelling Ras Doumeira, a small village bounded by Ethiopia's Afar Region. Eritrea was also accused of redrawing the map of the area. Eritrea denied both claims. The conflict worsened until May 1996, when Eritrean forces retreated from the area and Djibouti retracted the allegations. The Eritrean–Ethiopian War was a threat to and an opportunity for Djibouti. Ethiopia diverted trade through Djibouti via Eritrean ports, strengthening economic ties in accordance with the 1996 protocol. In 1999, Djibouti and Ethiopia signed a military cooperation agreement.

In 1998, Eritrea accused Djibouti of using its port to supply military equipment to Ethiopia. In June of that year, Djibouti deployed military force in the north to avoid an incursion during the war; French troops were involved with their Djiboutian counterparts. In 1999, France sent two frigates to guard against any approaches toward Ethiopia and Eritrea. Djiboutian President Hassan Gouled Aptidon's November 1998 attempt to mediate the Eritrean–Ethiopian War during the Organization of African Unity (OAU) summit was rejected by Eritrea for perceived partiality. Djibouti expelled its Eritrean ambassadors, and Tekest Ghebrai, an Eritrean national and the former executive secretary of the Intergovernmental Authority on Development (IGAD), was dismissed.

The December 1997 treaty was deemed too weak. Eritrea accused Djibouti of siding with Ethiopia in 1999, and Djibouti accused Eritrea of supporting Djiboutian rebel groups in the Ras Doumeira area; Eritrea denied this. Rapprochement between the countries returned in March 2000, after mediation by Libya. Isaias visited Djibouti in 2001, and President Ismaïl Omar Guelleh visited Eritrea. This visit created a joint cooperative commission that would conduct an annual review. Guelleh sought a friendly relationship with Eritrea, despite their military imbalance.

Guelleh visited the disputed area on 22 April 2008, and the Djiboutian Foreign Ministry said that the Eritrean position lay several kilometers inside Djiboutian territory. Eritrea denied an accusation that its soldiers had dug trenches, and military officials met two days later to compare the border map. Djibouti sent troops to the area. Guelleh said on 9 May that the "two armies are facing each other"; the situation was explosive, with hostile forces ready to dismantle Djiboutian sovereignty. With reported Qatari mediation, both sides agreed to resolve the confrontation by negotiation.

==== Somalia ====
In July 2018, Eritrea and Somalia established diplomatic relations. On 28 July, Somali president Mohamed Abdullahi Mohamed began a three-day visit with Isaias in Asmara during which Somalia expressed solidarity with Eritrea in diplomacy and international politics.

==== Russia ====
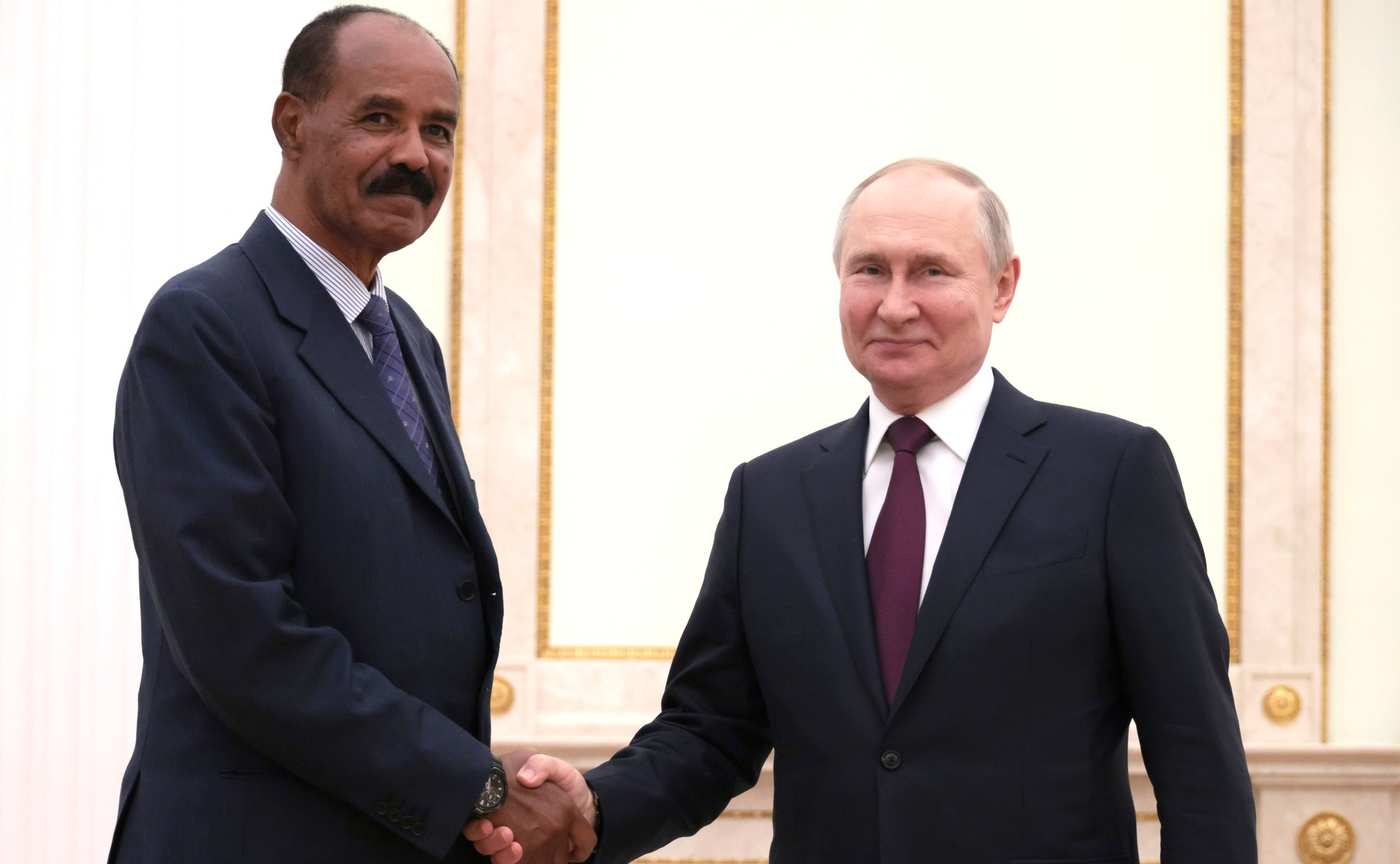
Isaias Afwerki with Russian President Vladimir Putin at the Kremlin in Moscow on 31 May 2023

Along with Belarus, Syria, and North Korea, Eritrea was one of only four countries not including Russia to vote against a United Nations General Assembly resolution condemning Russia's invasion of Ukraine in 2022. In July 2023, Isaias attended the Russia–Africa Summit in Saint Petersburg and met with Russian President Vladimir Putin. During the meeting with Putin, Isaias openly denied the existence of a war between Russia and Ukraine.

=== Forto incident ===
About 100 soldiers broke into Forto, the building housing the information-ministry correspondent for state television Eri-TV, on 21 January 2013 and surrounded the staff. They forced station director Asmelash Abraha to read a demand to release all prisoners of conscience and political prisoners and to implement the 1997 constitution. After he read two sentences, the station went off the air. Isaias' bodyguards were urged to protect him, his palace, and his airport. Eri-TV returned to the air at 10 a.m. to report a snowstorm in Paris. The mutiny subsided after the government negotiated the release of the ministry's employees.

== Personal life ==
In the summer of 1981, Isaias met his wife, former EPLF fighter Saba Haile, in a village called Nakfa. As of 2010, they had three children.

Shortly before Eritrea declared independence, Isaias contracted cerebral malaria and was flown to Israel for treatment. Arriving in a coma, he was treated at Sheba Medical Center in Tel Aviv, Israel, where he recovered after successful treatment. As of 2019, he was a member of the Eritrean Orthodox Church, one of the four legal churches in Eritrea.

His nickname "Isu" was frequently used in conversation to refer to Isaias in his political capacity and has appeared in news articles as well.

His training in China made him a great admirer of Mao Zedong, but he reportedly hates Deng Xiaoping.

=== Temperament ===
In a 2008 leaked assessment, United States ambassador Ronald McMullen described Isaias as "paranoid" and believing that "Ethiopian PM Meles Zenawi tried to kill him and that the United States will attempt to assassinate him."

== Foreign honours ==
- Saudi Arabia
  - Order of King Abdulaziz (16 September 2018)
- Serbia
  - Order of the Republic of Serbia, Second Class (2016)
- United Arab Emirates
  - Order of Zayed, First Class (24 July 2018)

== Notes ==
Political offices
New office	President of Eritrea; 1993–present	Incumbent
