= Cabinet of Ministers of Eritrea =

The Eritrean Cabinet of Ministers is headed by the President of Eritrea, Isaias Afwerki. Although it is mandated by Article 46 of the Constitution of Eritrea, it rarely meets, and its advisory roles have been taken over by informal advisors to the president.

== History ==
The cabinet was initially formed ahead of the 1993 independence referendum. In June 1993, the new Eritrean government announced a council consisting of 14 ministers and 10 local governors. This council was converted to the present Cabinet of Ministers in a March 1994 government decree. It was further formalized by Article 46 of the 1997 Constitution, though this constitution was never fully implemented.

In principle, the National Assembly of Eritrea approves all candidates for the Cabinet. As of 2016, the National Assembly was considered to be effectively nonexistent by the Office of the United Nations High Commissioner for Human Rights (UN OHCHR).

Although the cabinet still exists, the roles are largely ceremonial. According to a 2016 UN OHCHR report, informal "shadow" advisors from the army and the ruling party (People's Front for Democracy and Justice) serve the actual advisory roles that the cabinet is intended to serve. Ministers are expected to implement the president's goals, rather than advising the president.

Under the interim government between 1992 and 1993, the cabinet met approximately every six weeks. A 1994 announcement claimed that the cabinet would be meeting every month, but in practice, the meetings were often held late or skipped altogether. Since 2001, cabinet meetings have lacked a specific schedule. As of 2024, the cabinet had not met in six years (i.e., September 2018). Many of the minister positions have been held by the same officials since 1993, and some are now vacant because the office-holders resigned due to age or poor health.

== Cabinet Ministers of Eritrea ==
As of 2024, there are the following 17 cabinet-level ministries in Eritrea:

- Minister of Agriculture — Arefaine Berhe (2024)
- Minister of Defense — Sebhat Ephrem (2007); General Filipos Woldeyohannes (2014)
- Minister of Education — Semere Russom (2007)
- Minister of Energy & Mines — Ahmed Hajj Ali (2007); General Sebhat Ephrem
- Minister of Finance & National Development — Berhane Abrehe (2007); Berhane Habtemariam
- Minister of Fisheries & Marine Resources — Tewolde Kelati
- Minister of Foreign Affairs — Osman Saleh Mohammed (2007, 2026)
- Minister of Health — Amna Nurhusein (2007)
- Minister of Information — Ali Abdu (2007); Yemane Gebremeskel (2021—present; as of 2026)
- Minister of Justice — Fozia Hashim (2007)
- Minister of Labor & Social Welfare — Kahsay Gebrehiwet
- Minister of Land, Water, & Environment — Tesfai Gebreselassie
- Minister of Local Government — Weldenkiel Abraha
- Minister of National Development — Giorgis Tesfamichael (2024)
- Minister of Public Works — Abraha Asfaha (2007)
- Minister of Tourism — Askalu Menkerios (2024)
- Minister of Trade and Industry of the State of Eritrea — Nesredin Bekit
- Minister of Transport & Communications — Tesfaselasie Berhane (2024)
