= 2013 Eritrean Army mutiny =

Date	21 January 2013
Location	Asmara, Eritrea
Result	Coup d'état attempt failed; demands rejected

Belligerents
Eritrean Army rebels	Eritrean Government; Eritrean Defence Forces: Eritrean Army loyalists; Eritrean Navy; Eritrean Air Force; Eritrean Police Force

Commanders and leaders
	Isaias Afwerki; Ahmed Umer Kakay; Hadish Efrem

Strength
200 troops, two tanks	Unknown

The 2013 Eritrean Army mutiny was mounted on 21 January 2013, when around 100 to 200 soldiers of the Eritrean Army in the capital city, Asmara, seized the headquarters of the state broadcaster, EriTV, and allegedly broadcast a message demanding reforms and the release of political prisoners.

The mutiny was the first major incident of resistance to the rule of Isaias Afwerki since the purging of a group of fifteen ministers who demanded political reform in 2001.

Details about the mutiny remain murky, with several (but not all) government officials denying it even took place, while opposition sources claimed it had been an abortive coup attempt.

== Background ==
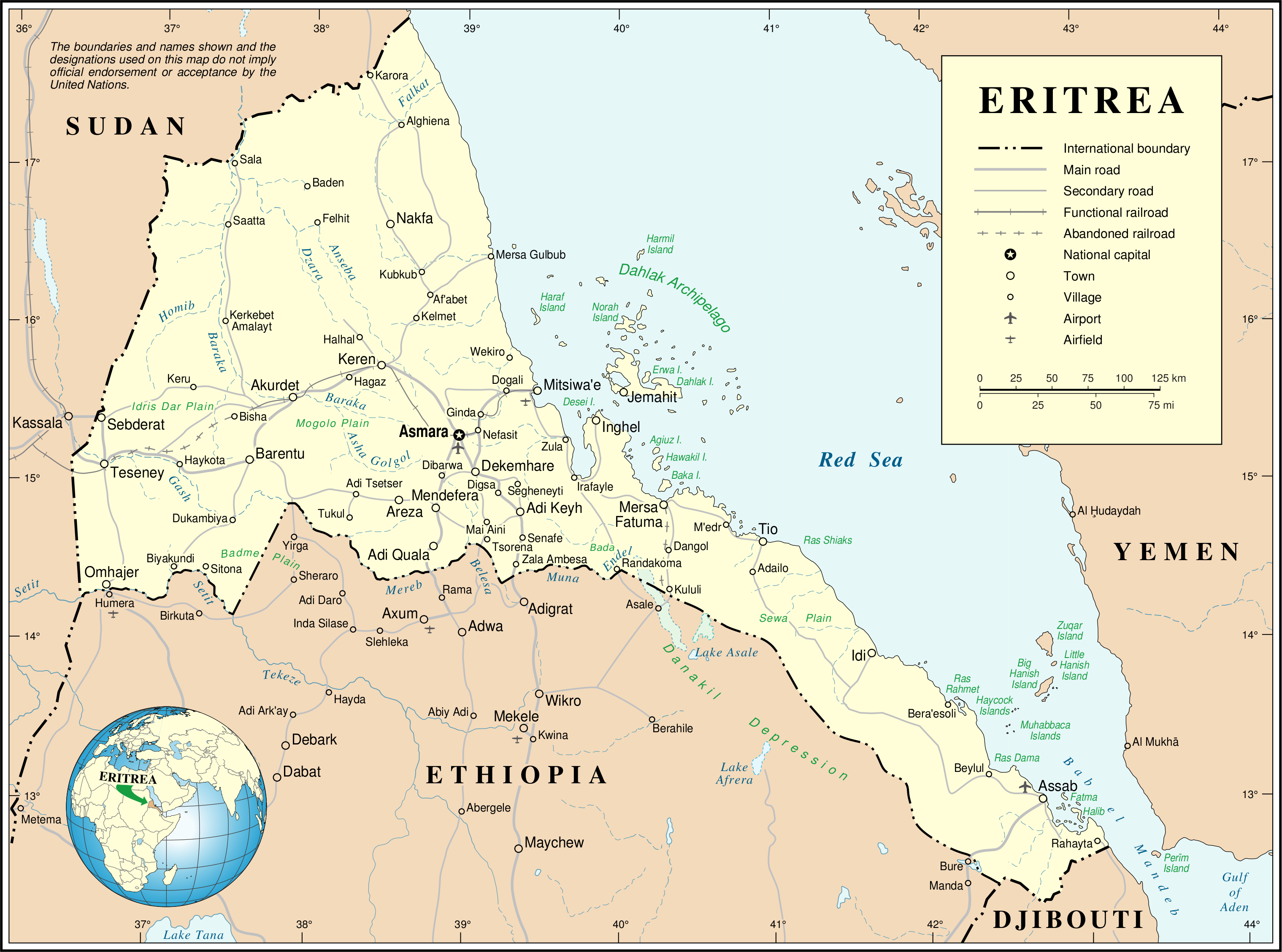
Map of Eritrea.

At the time of the mutiny, Eritrea had been ruled by Isaias Afwerki for two decades since its independence in 1993 from Ethiopia, following a 30-year war for independence. Initially allied with Ethiopian Prime Minister Meles Zenawi and his Tigray People's Liberation Front, whom Isaias' Eritrean People's Liberation Front had helped overthrow the communist regime of Mengistu Haile Mariam, border disputes caused relations between the two nations to rapidly turn sour, and in May 1998, Eritrea invaded Ethiopia. The resultant conflict killed between 70,000 and 100,000 on both sides. Although Eritrea was awarded most of the disputed territory by the Permanent Court of Arbitration, Ethiopia still occupied most of the disputed land until the outbreak of the Tigray War in November 2020.

The war caused a severe curtailment of political freedoms and rights in Eritrea, with the constitution's implementation being delayed indefinitely and most young people being forced into the Eritrean national service. Presidential and parliamentary elections were postponed and have never been held since independence. The People's Front for Democracy and Justice, nominally a transitional authority, is the sole legal political organisation, making Eritrea Africa's last remaining official one-party state and the only two non-communists one-party states with the proto-state SADR (controlled by Morocco) in the world (most African nations were at one point single party states, while all its neighbours, Sudan, Ethiopia, and Djibouti have dominant-party systems).

Religious activity has been strictly monitored and suppressed, with evangelicals in particular facing imprisonment and torture. Even the patriarch of the majority Eritrean Orthodox Tewahedo Church, Abune Antonios, was in 2007 forcibly removed and placed under house arrest. The level of repression has prompted many to call it "the North Korea of Africa" – Eritrea, which has no private media, has been ranked last in Reporters Without Borders' Press Freedom Index since 2007, below North Korea.

== The mutiny ==
Early on 21 January, the soldiers surrounded the headquarters of the state broadcaster, EriTV, known as "Forto", which sits atop a small hill overlooking Asmara. 200 troops, equipped with at least two tanks carried out the operation. The soldiers stormed the building and gathered all the employees into a room, and forced the director of EriTV, Asmelash Abraha, to read a prepared statement demanding the restoration of the constitution, the release of political prisoners, and the freeing of captured refugees.

Only after the EriTV director had read two sentences, the feed was cut off. The mutineers may have been unaware their message was not broadcasting. Due to the quick interruption in the transmission, it remains unknown if they were attempting to call on other military forces to back up their demands. In the view of an Africa Confidential journal report, "Perhaps it was not really a coup attempt or only a poorly organised one." The building surrounded by loyalist troops, who also took up defensive positions around the presidential palace and airport, with the city remaining mainly calm. Units of the 6,000 strong Special Brigade, effectively Isais's Praetorian guard, were deployed.

Reports vary as to whether the loyalist forces who suppressed the mutiny were led by Col. Saleh Osman, a hero of the Eritrean War of Independence or Special Forces Brigadier General Hadish Efrem.

There was a brief exchange of fire, during which two officers taking part in the mutiny were wounded, one of whom later died. According to the Eritrean government three other officer who had tried to escape had been captured. The dissident soldiers were effectively leaderless and loyalist troops allowed the mutineers safe passage back to their barracks in the evening. At 10pm, the broadcast resumed, and the station's employees were released. The soldiers were said to have withdrawn from the headquarters complex.

== Reaction ==
Days after the mutiny, a wave of arrests was carried out by the Eritrean government.

Iranian media outlet, Press TV, interviewed Tesfa-Michael Gerahtu, Eritrean Ambassador to the United Kingdom, who claimed that the attempt had been fabricated, and that there had been no unrest whatsoever. There is also controversy in the name of the kind of action led by these rebel militaries. The Permanent Representative to the African Union and the United Nations Economic Commission for Africa (UNECA), Eritrean Ambassador Girma Asmerom claimed that "As is the case all over the world an armed crazy, stupid and terrorist individual or group can take stupid actions... Such isolated incidents which frequently occur in the West are considered terrorist acts. I don't understand why in Africa they are considered coups d'état. It is the highest form of double standard and hypocrisy," thus implying that there had been unrest.
