= Berhane =

Berhane may refer to the following people:

- Berhane Abrehe, Minister of Finance of Eritrea
- Berhane Adere, Ethiopian athlete
- Berhane Aregai, Eritrean footballer
- Berhane Asfaw, Ethiopian paleontologist
- Berhane Habtemariam, Minister of Finance of Eritrea

== See also ==
- Helen Berhane, Eritrean Christian Gospel singer
- Natnael Berhane (born 1991), Eritrean professional road bicycle racer
- Senai Berhane (born 1989), Eritrean footballer
- Amain Berhene, American Musician
