= Estifanos Seyoum =

Eritrean politician (born 1947)

Estifanos Seyoum (born 1947) is an Eritrean politician.

He joined the Eritrean People's Liberation Front in 1972. Since independence, he has held the following positions:

- member of the Central Council of People's Front for Democracy and Justice
- member of the National Assembly
- Secretary of Finance
- Head of Finance in the Eritrean Defence Forces
- Director-General of Inland Revenue
- Brigadier General

He was educated at the University of Wisconsin–Madison, where he received a master's degree in finance and economics. As of 2005, he was in imprisoned as a part of the crackdown against the G-15. This group, known as the G-15, had signed an open letter calling for peaceful democratic reform in the one-party state.

Following his arrest, Mr Seyoum was held incommunicado and without trial. The entire group was never officially charged with a crime or brought to trial, and they were denied any communication with the outside world. As of 2005, he was known to still be in prison. After surviving six years in harsh prison conditions, it is believed that Estifanos Seyoum died in September 2007 as a result of infections related to chronic diabetes.

Seyoum has fathered 5 children: Shewit, Ariam, Miriam, Kibrom, and Natnael.
