= Aster Fissehatsion =

Eritrean politician

- Born: 1951
- Died: 2003 (unconfirmed)
- Occupation: politician
- Known for: Eritrean political prisoner of conscience
- Political party: People's Front for Democracy and Justice
- Spouse: Mahmoud Ahmed Sherifo (former)

Aster Fissehatsion (Astier Fesehazion) (born 1951) was a former Eritrean freedom fighter, women’s rights activist and government minister who was arrested for criticizing president Afewerki and the government. Amnesty International considers her a prisoner of conscience. She is the former wife of former vice-president of Eritrea, Mahmoud Ahmed Sherifo.

On 18 September 2001, she was detained indefinitely along with the other politicians of G-15, a group of prominent party officials who became known for a protest letter to President Afewerki. She has been detained in an unknown location ever since.

== Political life ==
She joined the Eritrean People's Liberation Front (EPLF) in 1974 and became a leading figure in the struggle for independence in Eritrea. Following independence, she held the following positions: member of the Central Council of People's Front for Democracy and Justice (the political party that succeeded the EPLF); member of the National Assembly; Director of the Ministry of Labour and Social Affairs.

In 1996, Fissehatsion was dismissed from her job for criticising the increasingly authoritarian government, but was reinstated in 1999. In May 2001, she was one of 15 senior party officials, later known as the G-15, who published an open letter calling for "peaceful and democratic dialogue"; and calling on President Isaias Afewerki to adhere to correct parliamentary and governance procedures, hold internal party meetings, and keep the promises made by the PFDJ in respect of judicial reform.

== Arrest ==
She was detained indefinitely in September 2001 for being part of the G-15, a group which opposed the rule of Eritrean president Isaias Afewerki. She is considered a prisoner of conscience by Amnesty International. Since the arrest, various governments and organisations have sought the Eritrean government to release the arrested prisoners, most famously in a campaign by Amnesty International launched in 2011. Amnesty International declared her and the other arrested persons as prisoner of conscience and sought immediate release of them. She was the only woman out of the 11 who were detained and out of the 15 who opposed, three fled the country and one withdrew support.
