= Abraha (name) =

Abraha is a name of Ge'ez origin meaning "he has illuminated" that may refer to

Given name

- Abraha, 6th-century Aksumite military general
- Abraha Asfaha, Eritrea's Minister of Public Works and Construction
- Abraha Hadush (born 1982), Ethiopian long-distance runner
- Abraha Kassa, Director of National Security for Eritrea

Surname

- Gebregziabher Abraha, Ethiopian general
- François Abraha (1918–2000), Ethiopian Catholic Bishop of Asmara
- Ogbe Abraha (born 1948), Eritrean politician
- Ruth Abraha (born 1989), Eritrean singer
- Siye Abraha (born 1955), leader of the Tigrayan People's Liberation Front
- Tekie Abraha, Eritrean football manager
- Woldemichael Abraha, Minister of Transport and Communications for Eritrea
