= Regional assembly (Eritrea) =

Regional legislative body of Eritrean unicameral system

Lower regional assemblies of Eritrea are found in each of the six zones of the State of Eritrea. These Assemblies are responsible for setting a local agenda in the event that they are not overruled by the National Assembly. The regional assemblies are in turn popularly elected within each region.

At the time of independence in 1993 Eritrea was arranged into ten provinces. These provinces were similar to the nine provinces operating during the colonial period. In 1996, these were consolidated into six regions (zobas). The regional electors elect the members of the regional assembly. However, the regional administrator is not selected by the regional assembly unlike the National Assembly of Eritrea that elects the President of Eritrea.

== Background ==
While Eritrea was federated to Ethiopia, and later annexed from 1952-1962, the Eritrean Assembly was the legislative body. Eritrea has a single-party National Assembly governed by the People's Front for Democracy and Justice or PFDJ (originally Eritrean Liberation Front), a totalitarian government. From the time of independence since 30 May 1991, the country has been continuing with a transitional government elected during the elections in April 1993. The scheduled national election in 2001 has been postponed indefinitely. The regional and local elections are conducted on a periodic basis on a restricted framework. All men and women of any ethnic or religious background are eligible to vote. No parties or groups other than PFDJ are allowed to contest and the elections are presided by representatives from PFDJ. Policy decisions should be centered around PFDJ mandate and opposition and dissenters have been imprisoned.

== Regions ==
At the time of independence in 1993 Eritrea was arranged into ten provinces. These provinces were similar to the nine provinces operating during the colonial period. In 1996, these were consolidated into six regions (zobas). The boundaries of these new regions are based on catchment basins. Critics of this policy contend that the Government of Eritrea was erasing the historical fabric of Eritrea while proponents believe that these new Regional boundaries would ease historical land disputes. Furthermore proponents of this policy argue that basing boundaries on an important natural resource would ease the planning of its use.

The composition of the 150 members of the National Assembly is: 75 members from the Central Committee members of the ruling PFDJ and 75 others elected from the 527 member Constituent Assembly in 1997. The 75 members were elected by the 527 Constituent Assembly members from all the six regional assemblies.

== Constitutional powers ==
Each region has a locally elected regional assembly while the local administrator is appointed by the President of Eritrea. During Cabinet meetings the President also meets with the Regional Administrators who report on the activities of their regions. The regional assemblies are charged with developing a budget for local programs and hearing the concerns of the local populations. Local programs included cultural events, infrastructure such as feeder roads, and to promote afforestation. The regional administrator is not selected by the regional assembly unlike the National Assembly of Eritrea that elects the President of Eritrea.
