= Woldemichael Ghebremariam =

2nd Minister of Land, Water, & Environment of Eritrea
- In office 2001–2013
- Preceded by: Tesfai Ghirmazion

Personal details
- Political party: PFDJ

Woldemichael Ghebremariam is the second Minister of Land, Water, & Environment of Eritrea. His predecessor was arrested as a member of the G-15.
