= Selma Hassan =

Minister of Labor and Human Welfare in Eritrea

Minister of Labor and Human Welfare of Eritrea
- Preceded by: Askalu Menkerios

Personal details
- Party: PFDJ

Selma Hassan is an Eritrean politician and a former Minister of Labor and Human Welfare (2011-2014).

Prior to her appointment as minister, Selma was Administrator of the Anseba Region.

== See also ==
- Politics of Eritrea
