= Chief of Staff of the Armed Forces (Eritrea) =

Chief of Staff of the Defence Forces
- Incumbent; Filipos Woldeyohannes since 19 March 2014
- Ministry of Defence
- Member of: Eritrean Defence Forces
- Reports to: Minister of Defence
- Appointer: President
- Formation: 1991

The Chief of Staff of the Eritrean Defence Forces. The person in this post is the highest-ranking military officer in the EDF and is responsible for maintaining operational control over military structures.

== List ==
No.	Name (birth–death)	Term of office			Ref.
No.	Name (birth–death)	Took office	Left office	Time in office	Ref.
1	General; Ogbe Abraha (1948–2002)	1991	February 2000	9 years	
?	Major general Gerezgheri Andemariam (1950–2014)	?	6 March 2014 †	?	
?	Major general Filipos Woldeyohannes	19 March 2014	Incumbent	12 years, 172 days	
