= Military ranks of Eritrea =

The Military ranks of Eritrea are the military insignia used by the Eritrean Defence Forces.

== Commissioned officer ranks ==
The rank insignia of commissioned officers.

| Rank group | General / flag officers | | Senior officers | | | Junior officers |
|---|---|---|---|---|---|---|---|---|
| Eritrean Army |
| Eritrean Army | Major general | Brigadier general | Colonel | Lieutenant colonel | Major | Captain | First lieutenant | Second lieutenant |
| Eritrean Navy |
| Eritrean Navy | Major general | Brigadier general | Colonel | Lieutenant colonel | Major | Captain | First lieutenant | Second lieutenant |
| (Eritrea) Eritrean Air Force |
| (Eritrea) Eritrean Air Force | Major general | Brigadier general | Colonel | Lieutenant colonel | Major | Captain | First lieutenant | Second lieutenant |
| Rank group | General / flag officers | | Senior officers | | | Junior officers |

== Other ranks ==
The rank insignia of non-commissioned officers and enlisted personnel.

| Rank group | Senior NCOs | | | Junior NCOs | Enlisted |
|---|---|---|---|---|---|---|
| Eritrean Army | | | | | | No insignia |
| Eritrean Army | Master Sergeant | Staff Sergeant | Sergeant | Corporal | Private first class | Private |
| Eritrean Navy | | | | | | No insignia |
| Eritrean Navy | Master sergeant | Staff sergeant | Sergeant | Corporal | Private first class | Private |
| (Eritrea) Eritrean Air Force | | | | | | No insignia |
| (Eritrea) Eritrean Air Force | Master Sergeant | Staff Sergeant | Sergeant | Corporal | Private 1st Class | Private |
| Rank group | Senior NCOs | | | Junior NCOs | Enlisted |
