= Ahmed Haj Ali =

Eritrean politician

2nd Minister of Tourism of Eritrea
- In office 1997–2001
- Preceded by: Worku Tesfamichael
- Succeeded by: Amna Nurhusein

1st Minister of Fisheries of Eritrea
- In office 2001–present

3rd Minister of Marine Resources of Eritrea
- In office 2001–2011
- Preceded by: Petros Solomon

2nd Minister of Energy & Mines
- In office 2011–2013
- Preceded by: Tesfai Ghebreselassie

Personal details
- Party: PFDJ

Ahmed Haj Ali is an Eritrean politician who has held various posts within the Government of Eritrea.

== Political career ==
After serving as Minister of Labour and Human Welfare, he was moved to the post of Minister of Tourism in February 1997. He has subsequently served as Minister of Fisheries and Marine Resources. He was also the first Eritrean Representative at the United Nations.

As of 2011, he is the Minister of Energy and Mines. He has signed mining agreements with companies from Western countries and China to facilitate the exploitation of Eritrea's mineral wealth.

In 2013, after Operation Forto, Ahmed Haj Ali was amongst those arrested.
