= Beraki Ghebreselassie =

Eritrean politician

Beraki Ghebreselasse

1st Minister of Education of Eritrea
- In office 1993–1996
- Succeeded by: Osman Saleh

2nd Minister of Information & Culture of Eritrea^{1}
- In office 1996–2001
- Preceded by: Alamin Mohammed Seid
- Succeeded by: Naizghi Kiflu

Personal details
- Born: 1946 (age 79–80)
- Party: PFDJ
- ^{1}Renamed Ministry of Information.

Beraki Ghebreselassie is an Eritrean politician. He joined EPLF in 1972 and, since Independence, held the following positions: member of the Central Council of PFDJ, member of the National Assembly, Secretary of Education, Minister of Information and Ambassador to Germany, The Holy See, Poland, Hungary and Austria. He was arrested in 2001 as part of the G15, a group of ministers and senior EPLF leaders who were pressing for political reforms. No trial was held and it is not known whether he is alive.
