= Ghebreselassie Yoseph =

Ethiopian politician

2nd Minister of Finance of Eritrea
- In office 1997–2001
- Preceded by: Haile Woldense
- Succeeded by: Berhane Abrehe

Personal details
- Party: PFDJ

Ghebreselassie Yoseph (Tigrinya: ግሄብረሰላስሴ ዮሴፍ) was Minister of Finance of Eritrea from February 1997 to 2001.
