= Eiraeiro prison =

Secret prison in Eritrea

- Interactive map of Eiraeiro prison
- Location: Eritrea; 15.7095°N 38.9583°E
- Status: Operational
- Security class: Maximum

Notable prisoners
- Dawit Isaak Seyoum Tsehaye Haile Woldetensae

Eiraeiro is a secret prison in Eritrea. Most sources give the location of Eiraeiro as being situated near the village of Gahtelay, in the Northern Red Sea Region. However, in an article in the Guardian, Eiraeiro is cited as being located approximately 10 miles from the capital, Asmara.

== History and role ==
Little is known about Eiraeiro, it is believed to have been built in c.2003, and used to indefinitely house political prisoners under Isaias Afwerki´s dictatorship. Standards of care are very poor; in 2008 it was reported that of the initial 35 prisoners, 15 had died and another 9 were in 'very poor health'. Prisoners are reportedly shackled 24 hours a day, and are severely emaciated. Torture is also reportedly carried out in the prison. According to a Reporters Without Borders report, Eiraeiro contains 62 cells, which each measure 3 meters by 3 meters. The prison has been described as a death camp.

Many of Eiraeiro's reported prisoners are journalists and former government officials who signed a letter protesting dictator Isaias' rule and policies, and called for his resignation, all of whom are being held without trial, for an indefinite period of time. The signatories are collectively known as the G-15. The status of the G-15 members, and that of other prisoners, is currently unknown, however in 2018 there were unconfirmed reports that former Minister of Finance and Development Haile Woldetensae had died in captivity. A former Eiraeiro guard who fled the country reported that approximately half of the imprisoned G-15 members had died by 2004.

In his 2018 book Dictatorland, journalist Paul Kenyon states that it is believed that approximately 30 or so similar detention facilities are found across the country.

== Notable inmates ==
G-15 Members including:

- Dawit Isaak
- Fesshaye Yohannes
- Seyoum Tsehaye
- Haile Woldetensae
