= Gergis Teklemichael =

Eritrean politician

1st Minister of Transport & Communications of Eritrea
- In office 1993–1997
- Succeeded by: Saleh Idris Kekya

4th Minister of Trade & Industry of Eritrea
- In office 2001–present
- Preceded by: Ali Said Abdella

Personal details
- Party: PFDJ

Gergis Teklemichael (alt. Giorgis) is the Minister of Trade and Industry of Eritrea.
