= Disability in Eritrea =

According to the Eritrea Population and Health Survey in 2010, there were around 149,103 people with disabilities in Eritrea.

== Classification ==
The majority of disability in the country are vision, mental and motion impairments.

== Law ==
The article 14(3), 41(6)(C) and 51(1) of the Constitution of Eritrea directly address disability issues in the country, which includes prohibition of discrimination to people with disability. Under the constitution, the government is obliged to ensure the social welfare and provide all citizens, including citizens with disabilities, with cultural, education, health and social services within the limit of the country resources.

== Policy ==
The Rehabilitation and Integration Division of the Social Welfare Department of the Ministry of Labour and Human Welfare is the government body responsible for issues related to disabilities and people with disability in the country.
