= Tesfai Ghirmazion =

1st Minister of Agriculture of Eritrea
- In office 1993–1997
- Succeeded by: Arefaine Berhe

1st Minister of Ministry of Land, Water, & Environment of Eritrea
- In office 1997–2003
- Succeeded by: Woldemichael Ghebremariam

Personal details
- Party: PFDJ

Tesfai Ghirmazion was the first Minister of Agriculture of Eritrea and moved in 1997 to the Ministry of Land, Water, and Environment as its first Minister.
