= Ogbe Abraha =

Eritrean politician (born 1948)

1st Minister of Trade & Industry of Eritrea
- In office 1993–1997
- Succeeded by: Ali Said Abdella

1st Minister of Labour and Social Welfare of Eritrea
- In office 1997–2000
- Succeeded by: Askalu Menkerios

Personal details
- Born: 1948 (age 77–78)
- Party: PFDJ

Ogbe Abraha (born 1948) is an Eritrean politician. He joined the Eritrean People's Liberation Front (EPLF) in 1972 and, since independence, has held the following positions: member of the Central Council of the People's Front for Democracy and Justice (PFDJ), member of the National Council, Secretary and then Minister of Trade and Industry, Minister of Labour and Social Welfare (beginning in February 1997), Chief of Logistics, Administration and Health in the Ministry of Defence, Chief of Staff of the Eritrean Defence Forces. Abraha was dismissed from his post and stripped of his military rank by the President in February 2000. He was arrested in September 2001 due to his membership of the G-15 group of ministers calling for political reforms. He has been held incommunicado since that time. He was reported to be suffering from asthma.

== Detention ==
In 2010, a former prison guard claimed that Ogbe had tried to commit suicide in Eiraeiro prison where he was held, and died from asthma in 2002. As of 2019, Amnesty International considered Ogbe's condition to be unknown.
