= National Security Office =

National Security Office may refer to:

- National Security Office (Eritrea)
- Office for Safeguarding National Security in Hong Kong
- Office of National Security in South Korea
