= Mahmoud Ahmed Sherifo =

Eritrean Diplomat

Minister of Foreign Affairs of Eritrea
- In office 1993–1994
- Preceded by: Mohammed Said Bareh
- Succeeded by: Petros Solomon

2nd Minister of Local Government of Eritrea^{1}
- In office 2000–2001
- Preceded by: Ali Said Abdella

Personal details
- Born: 1948; Southern Region, British Military Administration of Eritrea
- Died: December 2003 (unconfirmed)
- Political party: PFDJ
- ^{1}Ministry was renamed from Ministry of Internal Affairs.

Mahmoud Ahmed Sherifo (born 1948, possibly died December 2003), commonly known simply as Sherifo, was an Eritrean politician. He joined the Eritrean Liberation Front in 1967. He was an independent activist during Eritrea's war of independence from Ethiopia. Post-independence, he served in various capacities as Minister of Foreign Affairs and Minister of Local Government.

In September 2001 he was detained indefinitely along with other politicians who were known as the G-15, a group which opposed the rule of Eritrean president Isaias Afewerki. Mahmud along with 10 other ministers were arrested by the ruling front and detained in unknown location ever since. The ministers were critical of the president and called for implementation of the Constitution in an open letter. Amnesty International has named him a prisoner of conscience and called for his immediate release in 2011.

== Political career ==
Sherifo joined the Eritrean Liberation Front in 1967. He was an independent activist during Eritrea's war of independence from Ethiopia. Post-independence, he served as the Minister of Foreign Affairs before his last posting as Minister of Local Government. During this time he was also appointed Chairman of the Committee to prepare the draft laws concerning the first round of National Elections and the Political Party laws. Once the drafts were completed the Chairman of the National Assembly (and President), Isaias Afewerki summoned a report on the drafts. Mahmoud Ahmed Sherifo was detained for his calls for implementation in 2001.

== Arrest ==
Sherifo has been detained since 2001 following the G-15 affair. Dissidents suggest he has been detained for campaigning for democratic reforms, while official sources contend that his detention is a consequence of "discreetly...soliciting support in government circles for ousting the president, and to seek US and UN intervention to end the war on Ethiopia's surrender terms" while being detained. In September 2001 he was detained indefinitely along with other politicians who were known as the G-15, a group which opposed the rule of Eritrean president Isaias Afewerki. Mahmud along with 15 other ministers were arrested by the ruling front and detained in unknown location ever since. The ministers were criticizing the border war of the then president, Isaia and signed an open letter. He was fired along with other opposing members and was detained on 18 September 2001. He was considered a prisoner of conscience by Amnesty International. Although Eritrea has no post of vice president, nonetheless some sources have listed Sherifo as the vice president, and continue to do so (2006).

Amnesty International has named him a prisoner of conscience and called for his immediate release.

== Assumed death ==
It is believed that Sheriffo has died in December 2003 of complications related to diabetes, for which he did not receive medical attention. His death has never been confirmed.
