= Regional Administrators of Eritrea =

The Regional Administrators of Eritrea are appointed centrally by the President of Eritrea. The Regional Administrators supervise and work in collaboration with their elected Regional Assemblies.

The Regional Administrators usually represent the region (Zoba) in National Cabinet meetings and quarterly update meetings.

- Administrator of the Anseba Region: Selma Hassan
- Administrator of the Southern Region: Mustapha Nurhussein
- Administrator of the Gash-Barka Region: Musa Raba
- Administrator of the Central Region and mayor of Asmara: Semere Russom
- Administrator of the Northern Red Sea Region: Abdallah Mussa
- Administrator of the Southern Red Sea Region: Tsigereda Woldeghiergis
