= Himid =

Himid is a surname. Notable people with the surname include:

- Hamid Himid (born c. 1955), Eritrean politician
- Lubaina Himid (born 1954), British artist and curator
