= Yemane =

Yemane (Amharic: የማነ) is a male given name of Ethiopian and Eritrean origin that may refer to:

- Yemane Baria (1949–1997), Eritrean songwriter, composer and singer
- Yemane Gebreab (born 1954), Eritrean political advisor
- Yemane Haileselassie (born 1998), Eritrean male steeplechase runner
- Yemane Negassi (born 1946), Ethiopian former cyclist
- Yemane Tsegay (born 1985), Ethiopian long distance runner
