= Beraki =

Beraki is an Eritrean first name and surname. Notable people with the name include:

- Beraki Beyene (born 1980), Eritrean long-distance runner
- Beraki Ghebreselassie, Eritrean politician
- Tsehaytu Beraki (1939–2018), Eritrean musician, poet and political activist, known for her singing and playing of the krar
