= Worku =

Worku (Amharic: ወርቁ) is a male name of Ethiopian origin (a given name and a patronymic). Notable people with the name include:

- Asnaketch Worku (1935–2011), Ethiopian female singer
- Ayelech Worku (born 1979), Ethiopian long-distance runner
- Bazu Worku (born 1990), Ethiopian marathon runner
- Eyassu Worku (born 1998), American basketball player
- Mengistu Worku (1940–2010), Ethiopian footballer and coach
- Worku Tesfamichael, Eritrea Minister for Tourism
- Worku Bikila (born 1968), Ethiopian runner
