= Haile Woldense =

Eritrean politician

1st Minister of Finance of Eritrea
- In office 1993–1997
- Succeeded by: Ghebreselassie Yoseph

Minister of Foreign Affairs of Eritrea
- In office 1997–2000
- Preceded by: Petros Solomon
- Succeeded by: Ali Said Abdella

3rd Minister of Trade & Industry of Eritrea
- In office 2000–2001
- Preceded by: Ali Said Abdella
- Succeeded by: Gergis Teklemichael

Personal details
- Born: 1946 (age 79–80) Hamasien, British Military Administration in Eritrea
- Party: PFDJ

Haile Woldense, Durue or Woldetensae (Tigrinya: ሃይለ ወልደትንሳኤ) is an Eritrean politician.

Woldense was born in 1946 and attended high school in Asmara. After graduation, he was accepted to the Addis Ababa University engineering program. There he met Isaias Afewerki and they withdrew from school to join the Eritrean Liberation Front.

In 1974 he became a member of what would become the Eritrea People's Liberation Front (EPLF) Central Committee and joined the Political Bureau. He was the head master of EPLF's cadre school, who transformed the movement.

After Independence he became the Minister of Finance and Development and served in that position until 1997. In mid-February 1997, he was appointed Minister of Foreign Affairs. In this role, he signed the Cessation of Hostilities Agreement in June 2000, bringing a formal end to the Eritrean-Ethiopian war.

After the war ended, his relations with President Isaias Afwerki worsened and he was demoted to the position of Minister of Trade. In September 2000, he was arrested as one the G-15 group, who called for democratic reform and for the implementation of the Eritrean Constitution.

Amnesty International considers Woldense and the other imprisoned G-15 members to be prisoners of conscience and has called for their immediate release.
