= Habtemariam =

Habtemariam is a surname. Notable people with the surname include:

- Berhane Habtemariam, Eritrean politician
- Ethiopia Habtemariam (born 1979), American businesswoman
- Lydia Habtemariam, Canadian singer
- Nebiat Habtemariam (born 1978), Eritrean long-distance runner
