= Alamin Mohammed Seid =

Eritrean politician (died 2021)

1st Minister of Information & Culture of Eritrea
- In office 1993–1996
- Succeeded by: Beraki Ghebreselassie

Personal details
- Born: 1946 or 1947 Massawa, Eritrea
- Died: 15 November 2021 (aged 74) Riyadh, Saudi Arabia
- Party: PFDJ

Alamin Mohammed Seid (Arabic: الأمين محمد سيد; 1946 or 1947 – 15 November 2021) was an Eritrean politician.

He was born in Massawa, Eritrea.

Alamin was involved in the Eritrean War of Independence since 1964 when he joined the Eritrean Liberation Front. He later joined what would become the Eritrean People's Liberation Front (EPLF) in 1970. During the War of Independence he was the head of the EPLF's foreign relations department.

Alamin also served briefly as the Minister of Information and Culture. He and Isaias Afewerki were the only two members of the EPLF Executive Committee to be part of the People's Front for Democracy and Justice's Executive Council at the Third Congress. At this Congress he was elected to the Secretary position, where he served.
