= MND =

MND may refer to:

== Businesses and organisations ==
- MND (company), a Czech oil and gas producer
- Ministry of National Defense, in several governments
- Mount Notre Dame High School, Cincinnati, Ohio, US
- Ministry of National Development (disambiguation), in several governments

== Medicine ==
- Motor neuron diseases, a group of disorders
  - Amyotrophic lateral sclerosis (ALS), the main type of motor neurone disease

== Other uses ==
- Mondé language, spoken in Brazil (ISO 639: mnd)
- Medina Airport, Colombia (IATA: MND)

== See also ==
- A Midsummer Night's Dream (AMND), a 1595/1596 play by Shakespeare
