= Eritrean nationalism =

Eritrean nationalism is centered on the fact that since 1889, Eritreans have shared a common history, and as such constitute a nation onto themselves. The historical development that first gave birth to the new "Eritrean" identity occurred in 1882 when the Italian colonization of the territory started occurring in that year. Up until that point, the "Eritrean" identity hadn't existed and most of the territories of the modern-day state had been closely integrated for thousands of years with Ethiopia, either as a unified dominion or through various vassal relationships, with brief periods of occupation by other powers such as the Ottoman Empire. The basis for this nationalism is mainly centered on the Italian colonization of the territory in 1889, and the modern state of Eritrea with its current borders was formed as the successor to the Italian colony that was established in 1889 as a compromise between Ethiopia and Italy following the Italo-Ethiopian War of 1887–1889. Eritrea has nine major ethnic groups, each with their own language and culture and is split between two major religions, Christianity and Islam. However, the Eritrean government seeks to foster Eritrean nationalism through programs such as national service, the promotion of civic nationalism and the formation of the youth organization YPFDJ, as well as curbing foreign influences.

== Symbols ==
Symbols that have been associated with Eritrean nationalism include the emblem of Eritrea, the anthem Ertra, Ertra, Ertra, and the Flag of Eritrea as well as the Flag of the EPLF. Movements that have been associated with Eritrean nationalism include the Eritrean Liberation Front, Eritrean People's Liberation Front and People's Front for Democracy and Justice. People that are often associated with Eritrean nationalism include Isaias Afwerki, Sebhat Efrem and Ramadan Mohammed Nur.

== See also ==
- Pan-nationalism
- Ethnic nationalism
