= Mohamed Omer (Eritrean politician) =

Interim foreign minister of Eritrea

Mohamed Omer ali

Minister of Foreign Affairs of Eritrea
- In office 2005 – 18 April 2007
- Preceded by: Ali Said Abdella
- Succeeded by: Osman Saleh Mohammed

Personal details
- Born: adi shelko
- Party: PFDJ

Mohamed Omer served as the interim foreign minister of Eritrea after the death of Ali Said Abdella in August 2005. He is currently the Director General of the North Africa and Middle East Desk of the Eritrean Foreign Ministry.
