= Eritrean Defence Forces =

Military force of Eritrea

- ሓይልታት ምክልኻል ኤርትራ (Tigrinya)
- Eritrean Defence Force badge
- Founded: 24 May 1991
- Service branches: Eritrean Army; Eritrean Navy; Eritrean Air Force
- Headquarters: Asmara

Leadership
- Commander-in-Chief: Isaias Afewerki
- Minister of Defence: General Filipos Woldeyohannes
- Chief of Staff: General Filipos Woldeyohannes

Personnel
- Military age: 18 years old
- Conscription: Open-ended
- Active personnel: 350,000
- Reserve personnel: 680,000

Expenditure
- Budget: US$ 280 million
- Percent of GDP: 10.9% (2019 est.)

Industry
- Foreign suppliers: Russia; Belarus; Bulgaria; China; Israel

Related articles
- History: Military history of Eritrea; Hanish Islands Crisis; Second Sudanese Civil War; First Congo War; Eritrean–Ethiopian War; Djiboutian–Eritrean border conflict 2013 Eritrean Army mutiny Battle of Tsorona; Tigray War; 2026 Eritrean invasion of Ethiopia
- Ranks: Military ranks of Eritrea

The Eritrean Defence Forces (EDF) (Tigrinya: ሓይልታት ምክልኻል ኤርትራ, romanized: Haylitat Miklikhal Ertra) are the combined military forces of Eritrea composed of three branches: Eritrean Army, Eritrean Air Force and Eritrean Navy. The Army is by far the largest, followed by the Air Force and Navy. The Commander-in-Chief of the EDF is the President of Eritrea. Their military role stems from Eritrea's strategic geographical location, located on the Red Sea with a foothold on the Bab-el-Mandeb strait.

== History ==
=== Pre-independence ===
Military history in Eritrea stretches back for thousands of years; from ancient times to present day. During the kingdom of Medri Bahri, the military fought numerous battles against the invading forces of the Abyssinians to the south and the Ottoman Turks at the Red Sea.

During the 16th century the port of Massawa was used by the Ottomans to protect sea lanes from disruption, while more recently it was used by the Italians during their colonial occupation. The kingdom of Medri Bahri was dissolved and the Colony of Eritrea was founded by the Italians in 1890, shortly after the opening of the Suez Canal. When Italian troops occupied Ethiopia in 1936, Eritrean native soldiers (known as Askaris) supported the invading force. However, this was reversed by British and Ethiopian troops in 1941. The Eritrean infantry battalions and cavalry squadrons of the "Regio Corpo Truppe Coloniali" (Royal Colonial Corps) saw extensive service in the various Italian colonial territories between 1888 and 1942.

During the war for Eritrea's independence rebel movements (the ELF and the EPLF) used volunteers. In the final years of the struggle for independence, the EPLF ranks grew to 110,000 volunteers (some 3% of the total population).

=== Independence (1991–present) ===
During the first two decades of independence, the EDF formally had the power to detain and arrest civilians, and used this power to help police detain and arrest civilians, which systematically happened for arbitrary reasons. Together with police, EPLF members and government officials, the EDF carried out widespread torture of Eritreans.

Military-run prisons included the underground Track B (or Tract B) in the west of Asmara, holding 2000 detainees; Adi Abeto near Asmara; Wi'a, 32 km south of Massawa, for holding military prisoners (escaped conscripts and draft evaders) and members of unauthorised religions; Mitire, in north-eastern Eritrea for religious prisoners; Haddis Ma'askar, mostly underground, near the Sawa military base; Ala Bazit in a desert next to the Ala mountains; and Mai Dima near Berakit Mountain for Kunama detainees.

==== Tigray War ====
In the Tigray War, the EDF was attributed the main responsibility for the extrajudicial killing of hundreds of civilians in the Aksum massacre, that mainly took place on 28–29 November 2020 in Aksum, according to investigations by Amnesty International and Human Rights Watch. As of 26 February 2021, just after the publication of the Amnesty International report, Al Jazeera English had not received responses from Eritrean officials, but commented that the Eritrean Minister of Information had stated in January 2021 that "the rabid defamation campaign against Eritrea [was] on the rise again".

On 12 November 2021, the U.S. Department of the Treasury's Office of Foreign Assets Control added the EDF to its Specially Designated Nationals (SDN) list for being "a government entity that has engaged in, or whose members have engaged in, activities that have contributed to the crisis in northern Ethiopia or have obstructed a ceasefire or peace process to resolve such crisis".

== Leadership ==
The EDF was led from 1991 by Ogbe Abraha, until 2000, when he was dismissed for his participation in the G-15 group of ministers who called for political change in Eritrea. A prison guard stated that Ogbe died in prison in 2002 from asthma. As of 2014, the Chief of Staff is Filipos Woldeyohannes.

== Manpower ==
The size of Eritrea's population is small, particularly when compared to its neighbors. During peacetime the military of Eritrea numbers approximately 245,000 with a reserve force of approximately 850,000.

=== National service ===
Every able bodied man and woman is required to serve ostensibly for 18 months. In this time they receive six months of military training and the balance is spent working on national reconstruction projects. This program allegedly aims to compensate for Eritrea's lack of capital and to reduce dependence on foreign aid, while welding together an ethnically diverse society, half Christian and half Muslim, representing nine ethnic groups. This is outlined in both the Constitution of Eritrea and Proclamation 82 issued by the National Assembly on 1995-10-23. However, the period of enlistment may be extended during times of national crisis and the typical period of national service is considerably longer than the minimum. Since the 1990s, conscription has been effectively open-ended; this draft policy has been likened to "slavery" and has earned international condemnation.

Military training is given at the Sawa Defence Training Centre and Kiloma Military Training Centre. Students, both male and female, are required to attend the Sawa Training Centre to complete the final year of their secondary education, which is integrated with their military service. Students who do not attend this period of training will not be allowed to attend university - many routes to employment also require proof of military training. However, they may be able to attend a vocational training centre, or to find work in the private sector. At the end of the 1½-year national service, a conscript can elect to stay on and become a career military officer. Conscripts who elect otherwise may, in theory, return to their civilian life but will continue to be reservists. In practice, graduates of military service are often chosen for further national service according to their vocation - for example, teachers may be compulsorily seconded for several years to schools in an unfamiliar region of the country. According to the Government of Eritrea, "The sole objective of the National Service program is thus to cultivate capable, hardworking, and alert individuals."

Eritrean conscripts are used in non-military capacities as well. Soldiers are often used as supplemental manpower in the country's agricultural fields picking crops, though much of the harvested food is used to feed the military rather than the general population.

=== People's Militia ===
In 2012 the government created People's Militia (known natively as the "Hizbawi Serawit"), to provide additional military training to civilians and assist in development work. Many elderly citizens have been forced to join. Its organizational structure is set up by profession and/or geographic. It serves as a form of national service. In 2013, it was led by Brigadier General Teklai Manjus.

== Foreign military relations ==
In March 2017, the US sanctioned the Eritrean Navy after an illicit shipment of North Korean military communications gear bound for Eritrea was intercepted. During the Sudanese civil war, reports also emerged that Eritrean ports were used to transit Iranian drones and military equipment to the Sudanese Armed Forces.

Since 2019, the Eritrea Defense Force has been helping the reestablishment of the Somali National Army. That year it clandestinely accepted 5,000 recruits for military training. During the Tigray War that began in 2020, Amhara militants involved in the conflict received military training from the EDF.

On the 8th of February 2026, the Ethiopian Foreign Minister accused the Eritrean Armed forces of "military aggression and of supporting armed groups inside Ethiopian territory".
