= Hamid Himid =

Eritrean politician (born c. 1955)

Hamid Himid (born c. 1955) is an Eritrean politician. Since the establishment of Eritrean independence, he has occupied the following positions: member of the Central Council of PFDJ from 1994 to 2001, member of the National Assembly, Head of the Middle East Department in the Ministry of Foreign Affairs, Administrator of the Senhit Province, Ambassador to Saudi Arabia, and Head of the Middle East and North Africa Department and of the Political Department in the Ministry of Foreign Affairs. He was arrested on September 18 (or 19) 2001 for being a member of the G-15 along with 11 other members, some suggest this was retaliation for publicly denouncing the practises of the Eritrean government.
