= Ministry of Defence (Eritrea) =

Government ministry of Eritrea

The Ministry of Defence of Eritrea is an Eritrean government agency responsible for the public finance policies of Eritrea. It is responsible for maintaining the Eritrean Defence Forces. The ministry is located in Asmara.

== Authority ==
It is responsible for the overseeing of the transfer of national service soldiers to the regular army as well as assign members of the national service.

== List of Ministers of Defence ==
No.	Portrait	Name (born–died)	Term of office			Political party	Ref.
No.	Portrait	Name (born–died)	Took office	Left office	Time in office	Political party	Ref.
1		Petros Solomon (born 1951)	1993	1994	0–1 years	People's Front for Democracy and Justice	
2		Mesfin Hagos (born 1947)	1994	1995	0–1 years	People's Front for Democracy and Justice	
3		Sebhat Ephrem (born 1951)	1995	2014	18–19 years	People's Front for Democracy and Justice	
As of 2014, Eritrea does not have a Minister of Defense.

== See also ==
- Eritrean Defence Forces
- Government of Eritrea
- Cabinet of Ministers of Eritrea
