= Worku Tesfamichael =

Eritrean politician

1st Minister of Tourism of Eritrea
- In office 1994–1997
- Succeeded by: Ahmed Haj Ali

Personal details
- Party: People's Front for Democracy and Justice (PFDJ)

Worku Tesfamichael was an Eritrea politician and the first Minister of Tourism of Eritrea. Worku guided the elevation of this former Department to Ministry status in hopes of attracting more tourists to Eritrea.

She was replaced as Minister of Tourism and instead appointed as Commissioner of Refugee Affairs in February 1997.
