= Abraha Kassa =

Eritrean politician (born 1953)

- Born: July 15, 1953 (age 73); Ethiopia
- Allegiance: Eritrea
- Branch: Eritrean Army
- Rank: Brigadier General

Abraha Kassa Nemariam (also known as Abraha Kassa and Wedi Kassa; born 15 July 1953) is an Eritrean Brigadier General. As of March 2021, he is the Director of the National Security Office of Eritrea, a post that he has held since 1997 or earlier.

== U.S. sanctions ==
On 12 November 2021, the U.S. Department of the Treasury added Kassa to its Specially Designated Nationals (SDN) list. Individuals on the list have their assets blocked and U.S. persons are generally prohibited from dealing with them.
