= Germano Nati =

Eritrean politician (1946–2008)

Germano Nati (1946–2008) was an Eritrean politician. He joined EPLF in 1977 and, since independence, has held the following positions: member of the Central Council and Executive Committee of PFDJ, member of the National Assembly, Administrator of the Gash-Setit Province and Head of Social Affairs in the Southern Red Sea Region.

Mr. Nati died on March 17, 2008, in the prison cell of the PFDJ regime, after being imprisoned in 2001 by Isaias Afwerki for being a part of the G-15 who called for a democracy.
