= Ministry of Foreign Affairs (Eritrea) =

Government ministry of Eritrea

State of Eritrea Ministry of Foreign Affairs
- Emblem of Eritrea

Agency overview
- Jurisdiction: Eritrea
- Headquarters: Asmara
- Minister responsible: Osman Saleh

The Ministry of Foreign Affairs of Eritrea is a government ministry which oversees the foreign relations of Eritrea. Eritrea's current minister of foreign affairs is Osman Saleh, since 2007.

== List of ministers ==
This is a list of ministers of foreign affairs of Eritrea:

No.	Portrait	Name (born–died)	Term of office			Political party	Ref.
No.	Portrait	Name (born–died)	Took office	Left office	Time in office	Political party	Ref.
1		Mahmoud Ahmed Sherifo (1948–2003)	1993	1994	0–1 years	People's Front for Democracy and Justice	
2		Petros Solomon (born 1951)	1994	1997	2–3 years	People's Front for Democracy and Justice	
3		Haile Woldense (born 1946)	1997	2000	2–3 years	People's Front for Democracy and Justice	
4		Ali Said Abdella (1949–2005)	2000	28 August 2005 †	4–5 years	People's Front for Democracy and Justice	
–		Mohamed Omer acting	28 August 2005	18 April 2007	1 year, 233 days	People's Front for Democracy and Justice	
5		Osman Saleh (1949–2005)	18 April 2007	Incumbent	19 years, 112 days	People's Front for Democracy and Justice	

== See also ==
- Foreign aid to Eritrea
- List of diplomatic missions of Eritrea
- List of diplomatic missions in Eritrea
