= Ali Said Abdella =

Eritrean hero commander and politician

1st Minister of Internal Affairs of Eritrea^{1}
- In office 1993–1997
- Succeeded by: Mahmoud Ahmed Sherifo

2nd Minister of Trade and Industry of Eritrea
- In office 1997–2000
- Preceded by: Ogbe Abraha
- Succeeded by: Haile Woldense

Minister of Foreign Affairs of Eritrea
- In office 2000–2005
- Preceded by: Haile Woldense
- Succeeded by: Mohamed Omer

Personal details
- Born: 1949 Bardooli, British Military Administration in Eritrea
- Died: August 28, 2005 Asmara, Eritrea
- Party: PFDJ
- ^{1}Ministry renamed Ministry of Local Government.

Ali Said Abdella (September 1949 – August 28, 2005) was an Eritrean rebel commander, politician and diplomat, who at the time of his death was serving as Minister of Foreign Affairs of Eritrea.

Ali Said was the son of a local sheik. He was of Afar ethnic origin. As a young man, he joined the Eritrean Liberation Front, a rebel group which was fighting for Eritrean independence from Ethiopia. He received medical and military training in Syria in 1965, after which he was known to lead a commando operation for hijacking and consequently burning the Ethiopian aeroplane in Karachi, Pakistan in 1969. Soon he returned to Eritrea where he was an active fighter. By the 1970s he had switched to Eritrea's other rebel group, the Eritrean People's Liberation Front and, in 1977, he became a member of the politburo of that organization. He was the commander of Nacfa front when the city was liberated in 1977.

When Eritrea gained independence in the early 1990s, first from 1990-93 before Eritrean referendum was conducted, Ali Said served as a chief of military operations. Later in the new government, he became the first Minister of Internal Affairs. He was then appointed as Minister of Trade and Industry in February 1997. In October 2000, Ali Said was moved from his position as Minister of Trade and Industry to that of Minister of Foreign Affairs, switching jobs with Haile Woldense. He was a fluent Arabic speaker, and most of his overseas trips were to Middle Eastern countries. He also made an official visit to Russia in April 2005.

Ali Said died suddenly of a heart attack in his sleep at his home in Eritrea's capital, Asmara, on August 28, 2005. The Eritrean government declared three days of public mourning for him. There have been numerous speculation that top government officials including the President killed Ali due to secret talks he had about creating an uprising in Asmara and for it to spread across the country. These speculations have yet be confirmed and no sources were provided to back up the claim.

Ali Said was married and had four children.
