= Saleh Meki =

1st Minister of Marine Resources
- In office 1993–1995
- Succeeded by: Petros Solomon

3rd Minister of Health
- In office 1997–2009
- Succeeded by: Amna Nurhusein

Personal details
- Died: October 2, 2009; Asmara, Zoba Ma'ekel, Eritrea
- Political party: PFDJ

Saleh Meki (1948 – October 2, 2009) was an Eritrean politician and government minister. He was a member of the Eritrean People's Liberation Front, which had offices in the San Francisco Bay Area of the United States, during the period of the Eritrean War of Independence.

Meki was trained as a nurse anesthesiologist in the United States. He returned to Eritrea following the end of the country's war for independence against Ethiopia.

Meki was appointed and confirmed as the first Minister of Marine Resources following Eritrea's independence. He later also served as the country's Minister of Health, before being reassigned as the Minister of Marine Resources once again in a cabinet reshuffle.

Saleh Meki died on Friday, October 2, 2009, following a heart attack at the age of 62. He was buried in the Martyrs’ Cemetery in Asmara, the capital of Eritrea.
