= Amna Nurhusein =

Amina Nurhusein

Minister of Tourism of Eritrea
- In office 2001–2009
- Preceded by: Ahmed Haj Ali

Minister of Health
- In office 2009–present
- Preceded by: Saleh Meki

Personal details
- Political party: PFDJ

Amna Nurhusein is the minister of health in Eritrea. She was elevated to this position in 2009. She served as the minister of tourism between 2001 and 2009.
