= Tesfai Ghebreselassie =

Eritrean politician

1st Minister of Energy & Mines of Eritrea
- In office 1993–2011

1st Minister of Land, Water & Environment
- In office 2011–present

Personal details
- Political party: PFDJ

Tesfai Ghebreselassie was Eritrea's Minister of Energy & Mines since Independence in 1993 until 2011. He has overseen agreements with Anadarko Petroleum and various gold mining and mineral companies. Furthermore, he has overseen the maturation of the Eritrean Electric Authority. His portfolio was changed to that of the Ministry of Land, Water & Environment in 2011.
