= Arefaine Berhe =

Eritrean politician

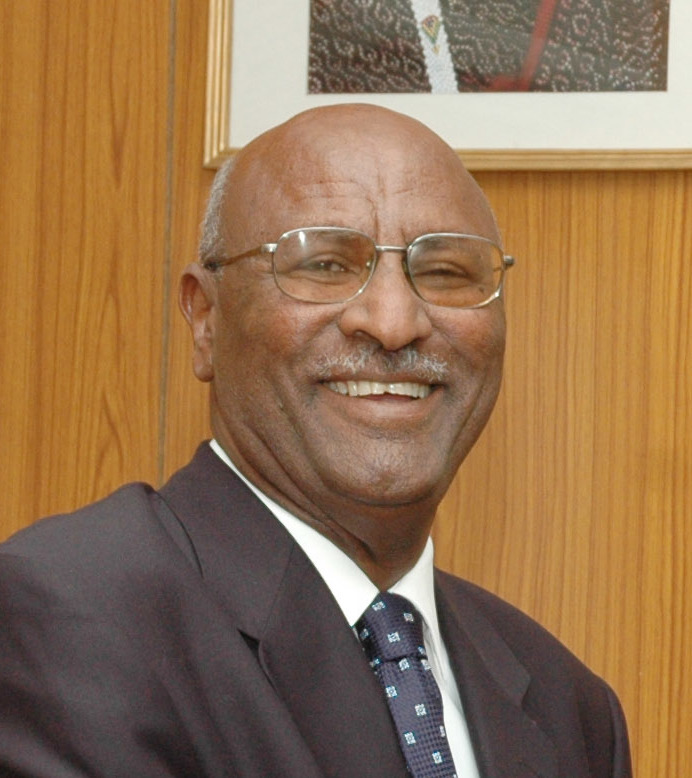

2nd Minister of Agriculture of Eritrea
- Incumbent
- Assumed office 1997
- Preceded by: Tesfai Ghirmazion

Personal details
- Party: PFDJ

Arefaine Berhe has been the Minister of Agriculture of Eritrea since Tesfai Ghirmazion was moved to the Ministry of Land, Water, and Environment in February 1997.
