= Young People's Front for Democracy and Justice =

Nationalist Eritrean diaspora youth organization

Young People's Front for Democracy and Justice ህዝባዊ ግንባር ንደሞክራስን ፍትሕን ን'ምንኦሰያት
- Motto(s): Victory to the Masses
- Ideology: Eritrean nationalism
- Mother party: People's Front for Democracy and Justice
- Website: youngpfdj.org

The Young People's Front for Democracy and Justice (Tigrinya: ህዝባዊ ግንባር ንደሞክራስን ፍትሕን ን'ምንኦሰያት, romanized: Həzbawi Gənbar nəDämokrasən Fətəḥən, Arabic: الجبهة الشعبية للديمقراطية والعدالة, romanized: al-Jabhatu l-Shaʻabiyatu lil-Dīmuqrāṭiyatu wāl-ʻIdālah; YPFDJ, Tigrinya: ህግደፍ) is a nationalist Eritrean diaspora youth organization and the youth branch of their parent organization, the People's Front for Democracy and Justice (Eritrea's sole legal political party). Conferences are held throughout the world by local chapters, particularly in North America and Europe.

Conferences have included both PFDJ dignitaries, members of the Eritrean government as well as non-Eritrean speakers.
