= Ministry of Justice (Eritrea) =

Government ministry of Eritrea

The Ministry of Justice of Eritrea assumes responsibilities such as the following: drafting new laws, regulating the admission and directives of the legal profession, and overseeing the budgetary and personnel affairs of the judiciary. Yet, with regard to the Special Court, the judiciary usually turns to the Ministry of Defense (rather than the Ministry of Justice) for legal and technical assistance. The Ministry of Justice might also provide legal training on matters pertaining to the courts. As recent as 2013, organizations such as the UNDP have been aiding the Ministry of Justice in expanding its human resources and institutional capacity.

== List of ministers (Post-1991 when the Eritrea declared independence) ==
- Fozia Hashim (1993–present) [1st Minister of Justice / 1st female]

== See also ==
- Justice ministry
- Politics of Eritrea
