= Ministry of National Development =

The Ministry of National Development may refer to:

- Ministry of National Development (Singapore), for the land-use planning and infrastructure development
- Ministry of National Development (Eritrea), for sectoral, regional and management audit of ministries

== See also ==
- List of public works ministries
