= Sebhat Ephrem =

Eritrean military officer and politician (born 1951)

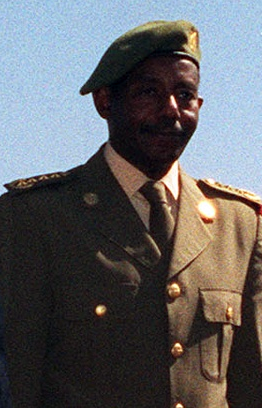

Minister of Energy and Mines
- Incumbent
- Assumed office 2013
- President: Isaias Afwerki

3rd Minister of Defence
- In office 1995–2013
- Preceded by: Mesfin Hagos
- Succeeded by: Filipos Woldeyohannes

2nd Minister of Health
- In office 1994–1995
- Preceded by: Haile Mehtsun
- Succeeded by: Saleh Meki

Personal details
- Born: 1951 (age 74–75) Aksum, Tigray Province, Ethiopia
- Party: PFDJ
- Education: Addis Ababa University (dropped out)

Military service
- Allegiance: EPLF; Eritrea
- Battles/wars: Eritrean War of Independence; Eritrean–Ethiopian War

Sebhat Ephrem (Tigrinya: ስብሓት ኤፍረም; born 1951) is an Eritrean military officer and politician who is the Minister of Energy and Mines for Eritrea. He was also the former Minister of Defence and former Eritrean People's Liberation Front (EPLF) commander during the Eritrean War of Independence.

== Early life ==
Sebhat Ephrem was born in 1951 in Aksum to parents from Asmara. His father was a Protestant-educated hospital administrator and Sebhat attended the Evangelical Lutheran School in Asmara. He later studied pharmacy at Addis Ababa University for two years before joining the EPLF in 1972. Upon joining the EPLF, he worked in the mass administration department and became part of the menka movement in 1973, a reformist fraction within the EPLF which Isaias Afwerki labeled as "ultra-leftist", however, he eventually renounced his joining as an "error".

== Military career ==
He quickly rose up the ranks from a political commissar to becoming part of the executive committee in 1977. He was also chosen to lead the EPLF's Department of Public Administration which meant he was responsible for organizing the civilian population within Eritrea. He became the General Staff of the EPLA in 1986 and was credited as the leading strategist of the victories at Afabet, Massawa and Dekemhare during the Eritrean War of Independence. After independence, Sebhat Ephrem served from June 1992 to March 1994 as the Governor of Asmara. From March 1994 to May 1995 he served as the Minister of Health. In both positions, he brought structure and reorganization to these offices. After leaving the military in June 1992, he returned to the army in May 1995 with the rank of general and was appointed and confirmed as Minister of Defense, where he played a leading role during the Eritrean–Ethiopian War.
