= Fozia Hashim =

Eritrean government minister and magistrate

1st Minister of Justice of Eritrea
- In office 1993–present

Personal details
- Born: 1956 (age 69–70) Asmara
- Party: PFDJ

Fozia Hashim is a former head of the High Court of Eritrea. She is a Muslim woman of Tigray descent. In 1993, she was appointed to the post of Minister of Justice.

As the Minister of Justice she has been responsible for the reorganization of the Court system and the drafting of a new legal code. All Proclamations and legal regulations are vetted by her office. Under her leadership community courts have elected their magistrates.
