= Dawit Isaak =

Swedish-Eritrean writer (born 1964)

- Born: 28 October 1964 (age 62); Asmara, Ethiopia
- Citizenship: Eritrean, Swedish
- Occupations: Playwright, journalist and writer
- Children: Betlehem Isaak, Danait Isaak, Yorun Isaak
- Writing career
- Notable work: Hope
- Notable awards: Norwegian Freedom of Expression Prize (2009)

Dawit Isaak (Tigrinya: ዳዊት ኢሳቕ; born 28 October 1964) is an Eritrean-Swedish playwright, journalist and writer who, if still alive, has been held in prison in Eritrea since 2001 without charges or a trial and is considered a traitor by the Eritrean government. Amnesty International considers him a prisoner of conscience and has called for his immediate and unconditional release. As of 2025, he is considered to be one of the world's longest continuously detained journalists, assuming he is still alive. Mike Balsamo, the president of the National Press Club, claims him to be the longest detained journalist in the world.

== Asylum and Swedish citizenship ==
Dawit migrated to Sweden in August 1987, upon which he settled in the city of Gothenburg. He became a Swedish citizen on 4 November 1992. When Eritrea gained independence, Dawit returned to his native country, married and had children. He began working as a reporter for the country's first independent newspaper, Setit. Eventually, he became a part-owner of the newspaper.

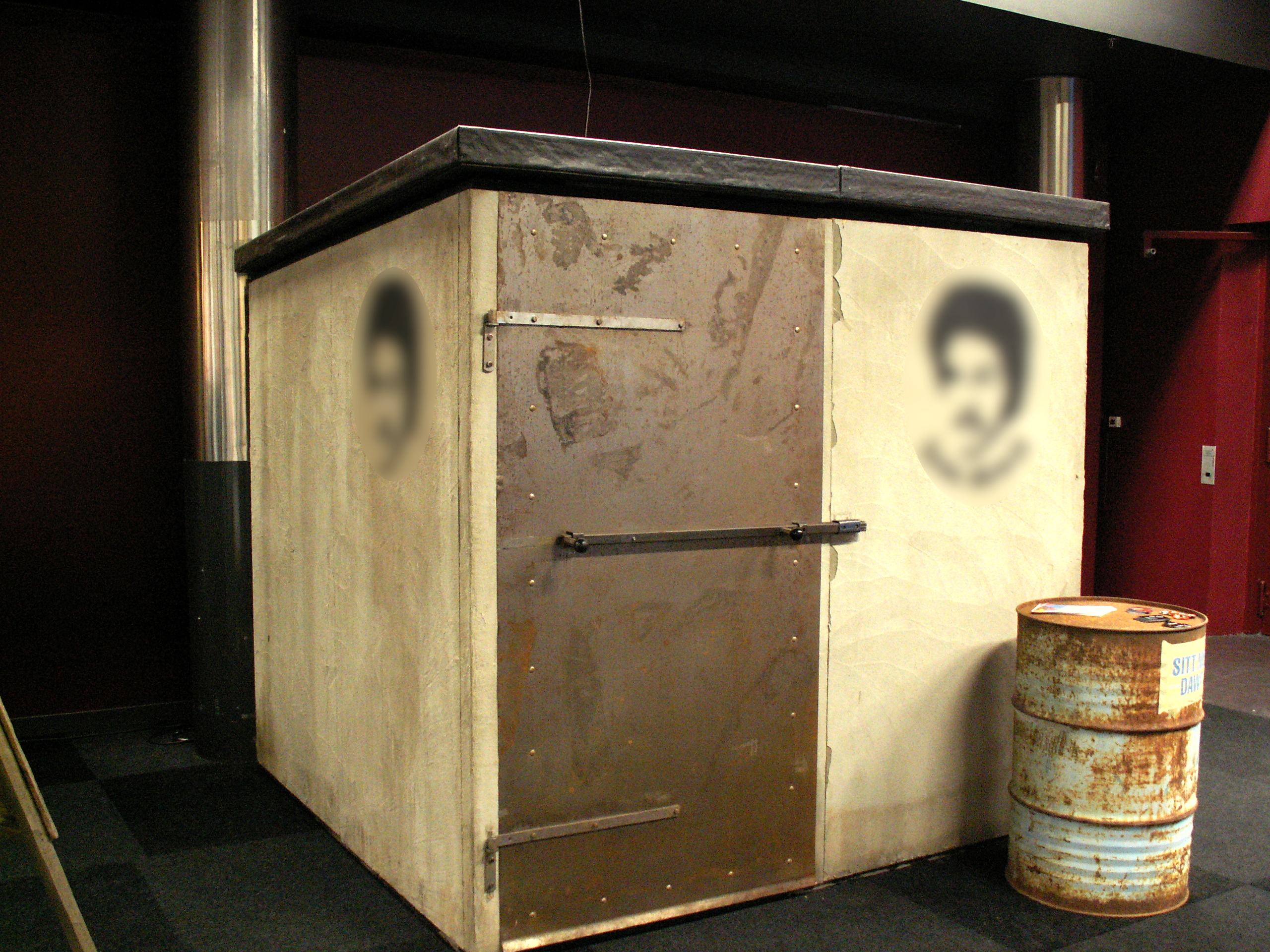
Possible replica of the prison cell of Dawit Isaak, exhibited at Mediedagarna i Göteborg (on Svenska Mässan), March 2015

== Imprisonment ==
On 23 September 2001, Isaak was arrested in his home in Asmara; his newspaper, Setit, was immediately shut down. At the same time, ten other independent journalists (including Temesgen Ghebreyesus, Seyoum Tsehaye, Fesshaye Yohannes, Medhanie Haile, and Amanuel Asrat) and eleven prominent reformist politicians of the G-15 were arrested for demanding democratic reforms in a series of letters to President Isaias Afwerki. The independent press, including the Setit newspaper, had covered the confrontation between the president and the reformers.

In April 2002, the Committee to Protect Journalists reported that Dawit was hospitalized due to torture. The Eritrean government denied allegations of torture but did not allow anyone to visit Dawit, who had not been tried before a court. Because he held dual Swedish and Eritrean citizenship, Swedish authorities began working for his release, using "silent diplomacy" according to government sources.

On 19 November 2005, Dawit was released from jail; according to official Eritrean sources, he was released only to see a doctor. While on his way to a hospital, Dawit was arrested again after just two days. He is believed to be held in Carchele prison in central Asmara.

Every week, a number of organizations, including Reporters Without Borders and the National Press Club, petition the Eritrean embassy in Stockholm to free Dawit. On 27 March 2009, four of the five largest newspapers in Sweden – Aftonbladet, Expressen, Dagens Nyheter and Svenska Dagbladet – featured a plea for the release of Dawit on their front pages. In addition, the five newspapers featured joint reports on Dawit's situation and wrote a joint petition, which was handed over to the Eritrean embassy in Stockholm on 4 May. By that date, 209,963 people had signed the petition.

== Rumors about death ==
On several occasions, rumors have circulated that Dawit is no longer alive. For example, on 27 October 2011, his 47th birthday, Swedish commercial radio channel Radio 1 claimed that Dawit could well be dead.

== 23 years in prison ==
On 23 September 2024, Dawit Isaak marked 23 years in imprisonment. Several demonstrations and campaigns highlighted his situation during the autumn of 2024, including a commemoration of his 60th birthday on 27 October. This event, held in Stockholm at the House of Authors, featured representatives from media, organisations such as Swedish PEN, Free Dawit, and Reporters Without Borders, as well as members of his family.

== Parliamentary and legal initiatives ==
=== Sweden ===
On 26 May 2009, during an interview with TV4, Isaias dismissed the case altogether, saying "We will not have any trial and we will not free him. We know how to handle his kind [...] To me, Sweden is irrelevant. The Swedish government has nothing to do with us."

The "silent diplomacy" method that the Swedish authorities have employed to work for Isaak's release has been criticized by the Swedish media, and the president of the Swedish branch of Reporters Without Borders, Jesper Bengtsson, issued a statement in April 2010 saying that "[i]t is a disgrace that Dawit remains in prison and it is remarkable that the Swedish government does not try harder to get him released."

During the autumn of 2024, various efforts were made to bring attention back to Isaak's case. A motion titled "Release of Dawit Isaak and Defence of Freedom of Speech" (Motion 2024/25:2181) was submitted by Social Democrats Helén Pettersson and Fredrik Lundh Sammeli.

In the Government Statement on 10 September 2024 titled "For a Richer and Safer Sweden," Swedish Prime Minister Ulf Kristersson mentioned Dawit Isaak.

On 18 September 2024, Reporters Without Borders Sweden filed a complaint with the Swedish Prosecution Authority, accusing eight senior Eritrean officials, including President Isaias Afwerki, of crimes against humanity, torture, and enforced disappearance in the case of Dawit Isaak. This marked RSF's fourth attempt to prompt legal action in Sweden regarding Dawit. The complaint was supported by Swedish PEN and the Raoul Wallenberg Centre for Human Rights.

On 19 November 2024, the Swedish Prosecution Authority announced it would not launch a preliminary investigation into the allegations of crimes against humanity committed by Eritrean officials in Dawit's case. This decision coincided with Isaak being awarded the Edelstam Prize 2024 on the same day for his extraordinary courage in defending freedom of expression and human rights. Reporters Without Borders expressed deep disappointment at the decision. The organisation has submitted multiple complaints over the years, urging Swedish authorities to investigate the Eritrean leadership's actions in relation to Dawit's prolonged detention. Despite these efforts, the Prosecution Authority concluded that the lengthy duration of Isaak's imprisonment did not provide sufficient grounds to justify opening a new investigation.

In December 2025, Swedish Foreign Minister Maria Malmer Stenergard visited Eritrea, marking the first visit to Eritrea by a Swedish official in 32 years. Stenergard stated that Dawit is still alive, but the Swedish government did not receive any concrete proof of his status.

==== Canada ====
On 27 November 2024, MP Garnett Genuis (Sherwood Park—Fort Saskatchewan) submitted a petition regarding Dawit Isaak's case to the Canadian Parliament: Petition to the House of Commons – 441-02901 (Foreign Affairs).

==== United States ====
In the United States, Senator Dick Durbin called for the release of political prisoners worldwide. On 11 December 2024, Durbin opened his Senate floor speech by addressing Eritrea and Dawit Isaak's case.

== Awards ==
- On 2 March 2007, Isaak was awarded a newly established prize, dedicated to the memory of Anna Politkovskaya and awarded by the Swedish National Press Club.
- In 2009 Isaak was awarded the Kurt-Tucholsky-Prize by the Swedish PENAssociation.
- He was awarded the Norwegian "Ytringsfrihetsprisen", the Freedom of Expression Prize for 2009, at the annual meeting of the Norwegian Authors' Union on 14 March 2010.
- In October 2011 Isaak received the Golden Pen of Freedom Award of the World Association of Newspapers. The award was handed over in Vienna to his brother Esias Isaak.
- In March 2017 he received the 2017 UNESCO/Guillermo Cano World Press Freedom Prize.
- In November 2024, Dawit Isaak was awarded The Edelstam Prize for his outstanding contributions and exceptional courage in standing up for freedom of expression, one's beliefs, and in the defence of Human Rights.

== Bibliography ==
- Hope (2010)

== See also ==
Gui Minhai Another imprisoned Swedish citizen
