= Woldai Futur =

Dr. Woldai Futur

1st Minister of National Development of Eritrea
- In office 2002–2015

Personal details
- Political party: PFDJ

Woldai Futur

1st Head of the Eritrean Investment Centre
- In office 2015–Present

Personal details
- Political party: PFDJ

Dr. Woldai Futur (alt. Wolday) is the first Minister of National Development of Eritrea. His previous post was serving as an economic advisor to the President.

== Early life and education ==
Woldai Futur received his PhD at Southern Illinois University at Carbondale in Economics. Woldai also was a former employee of the United Nations.

== Minister of National Development of Eritrea ==
In a 2003 interview with IRIN News, Futur said that he did not believe that Eritrea's lack of foreign investment was due to their macro-economic, investment, trade, or economic policies. He speculated that this disadvantage stemmed from weak institutions, which are responsible for implementing the policies.
