= Edelstam Prize =

The Edelstam Prize
- Awarded for: Outstanding contributions in Human Rights
- Country: Sweden
- Presented by: Harald Edelstam Foundation
- First award: 2011
- Website: haraldedelstam.org

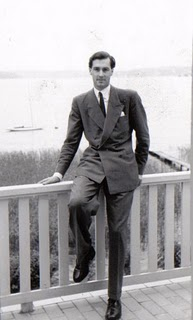
Harald Edelstam in 1946.

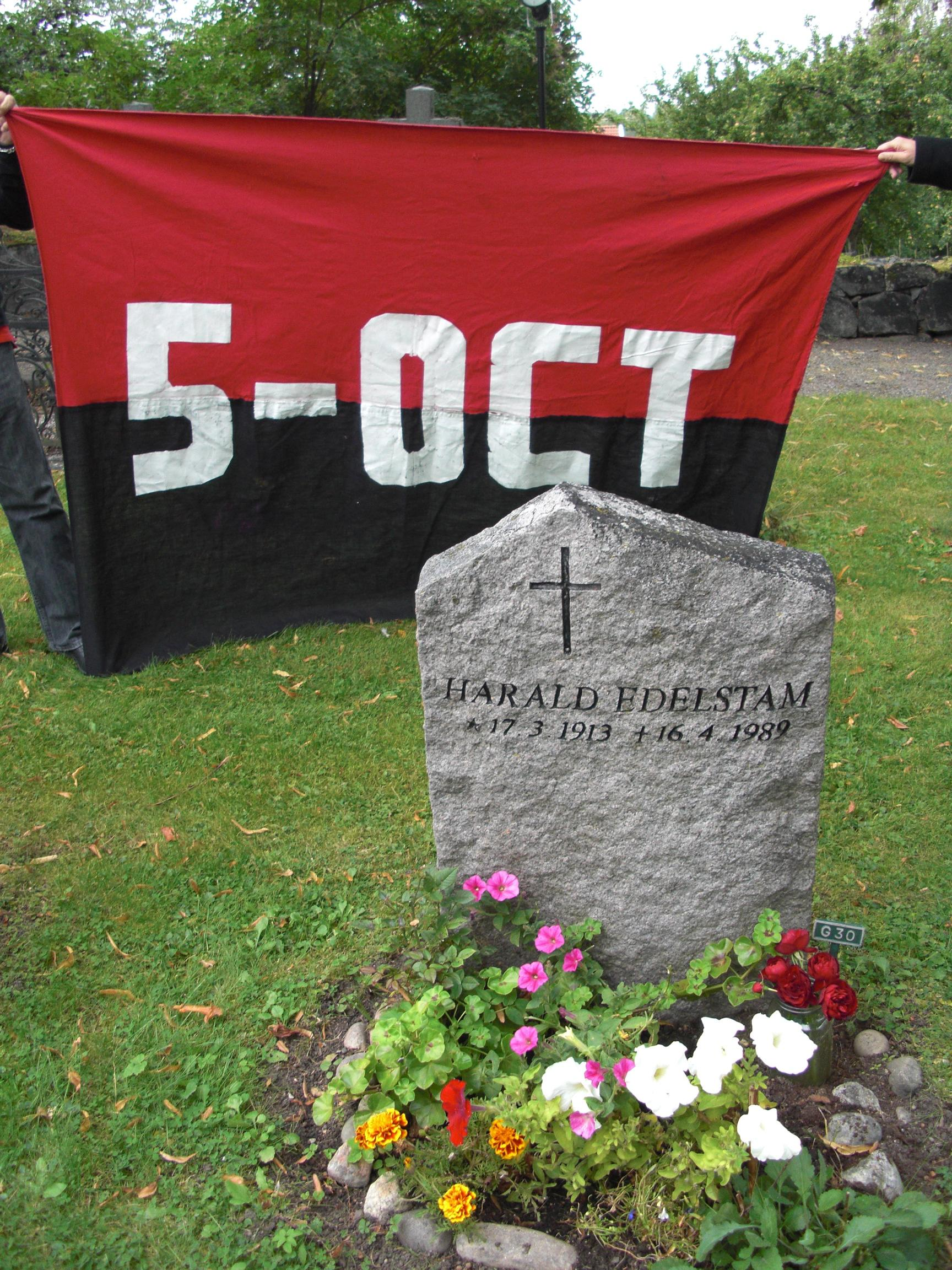
The grave of Harald Edelstam, September 11, 2010, at Eckerö church close to Stockholm. The celebration of him helping the Chilean and others to escape during the 1973 military coup.

The Edelstam Prize, named after Harald Edelstam, is awarded annually by the Harald Edelstam Foundation. The Edelstam Prize is awarded to a person who has shown outstanding contributions and courage in defense of Human Rights. The Edelstam Prize is named for the Swedish diplomat and ambassador Harald Edelstam (1913-1989). Harald Edelstam distinguished himself as diplomat by his professional competence, his bravery and his civic courage in the fight for Human Rights. He was an early proponent and symbol of what is today known as "Responsibility to Protect", and his memorable acts contributed to saving more than a thousand lives.

The winner of the Edelstam Prize can be someone from the private sector or a public servant. The winner embodies Ambassador Harald Edelstam's spirit in a country/countries where Human Rights, according to international law, have been violated.

The laureate demonstrates an ability to analyze and handle complex situations and to defend Human Rights. The candidate has, presumably in a complex situation, been able to take a decisive role in helping threatened people or directly saving human lives. Civic courage is a central parameter in the selection of the successful candidate.

== The Jury ==
An international jury selects the winners from a list of nominated candidates. The jury is chaired by Harald Edelstam's granddaughter Caroline Edelstam, co-founder of the Edelstam Foundation. The other members are

- Dr. Pascoal Mocumbi, former Prime Minister of Mozambique (1994-2004), representing Africa
- Judge Shirin Ebadi, Nobel Peace Prize Winner in 2003, representing Asia
- Former Judge Baltasar Garzón, who served on Spain's central criminal court, a consistent fighter for Human Rights, representing Europe. Baltasar Garzón is most famous for indicting the Chilean president, General Augusto Pinochet, for the alleged deaths and torture of Spanish citizens.
- Justice Louise Arbour, former UN High Commissioner of Human Rights, representing North America
- Dr. Luis Moreno-Ocampo, former Chief Prosecutor of the International Criminal Court, representing Latin America
- Professor Philip Alston, UN's special rapporteur on extreme poverty and human rights, representing Oceania

== The Nomination Committee ==
The Nomination Committee consists of

- Mrs. Lise Bergh (Chair), former Secretary General for Amnesty Sweden
- Professor Sadiq Jalal al-Azm, philosopher of Syrian origin striving for intellectual freedom and freedom of speech
- Professor Vitit Muntarbhorn, United Nations former Special Rapporteur on the Situation of Human Rights in Democratic People's Republic of Korea
- Deputy Tucapel Jiménez Fuentes, member of the Chilean Chamber of Deputies' Commission for Human Rights
- Silvia Escobar, former Human Rights Ambassador in Spain
- Professor Yash Ghai, UN's former Special Representative on Human Rights in Cambodia
- Lee Cheuk-yan, General Secretary of the Hong Kong Confederation of Trade Unions
- Stuart Russell, Co-chair of the International Association of People's Lawyers (IAPL) Monitoring Committee on Attacks on Lawyers

== Edelstam Prize Laureates ==
- 2012: Bahareh Hedayat
- 2014: Benjamin Manuel Jerónimo
- 2016: Juan Guzmán Tapia
- 2018: Li Wenzu
- 2020: Osvalinda Marcelino Alves Pereira
- 2022: Norma Esther Andrade
- 2024: Dawit Isaak

== See also ==
- Harald Edelstam
