= Foreign aid to Eritrea =

In 1998 net official foreign aid to Eritrea was US$135.8 million; in 2002 it reached US$217.6 million. In 2005 the country stopped accepting foreign aid. The government of Eritrea prefers private-sector investment to official aid programs, and its relations with aid-dispensing nations and international institutions have often been difficult.
