= Helen Berhane =

Eritrean Christian gospel singer (born 1974)

Helen Berhane (born c. 1974) is an Eritrean Christian Gospel singer who was a prisoner in Eritrea.

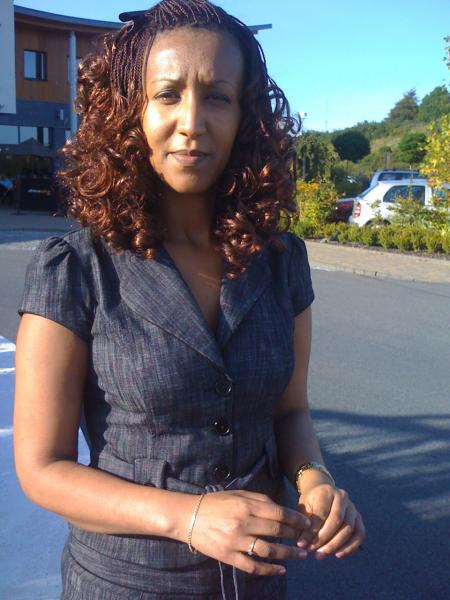
Helen Berhane, Church in Chains

== Life ==
Berhane is a member of the Rema church, one of several minority Evangelical Christian churches not officially recognized by the state of Eritrea and heavily persecuted. She was arrested on 13 May 2004, shortly after she released an album of Christian music, after refusing to sign a document pledging to end all participation in Evangelical activities, which included her music. She was detained at Mai Serwa military camp, north of the capital Asmara. She had no possibility of contact with her family and was denied legal representation or medical care.

On Eritrean Independence Day, 24 May 2006, Amnesty International renewed their appeal to Eritrea's president Isaias Afewerki to ensure the improvement of human rights standards in the country. Five of the six female prisoners Amnesty International appealed for the release of last year on this date, including Berhane, were still held at the time. They had not been charged with anything nor brought to any court.

Berhane's 2003 album, T' Kebaeku (I Am Anointed), was re-released in Europe in June 2006.

== Release ==
On 2 November 2006 it was reported that Berhane was released from prison in late October 2006, suffering heavy illnesses. She and her daughter Eva were granted asylum in Denmark after fleeing separately to the Sudanese capital of Khartoum for refuge.

== UK visa refusal ==
In 2010, Berhane was refused an entry visa to the UK, even though she had been invited to speak of her experiences of persecution in Eritrea at a series of meetings in Great Britain. An early day motion expressing regret about this decision was supported by 41 out of 41 MPs, none chose to withdraw from voting.

== Book ==
Berhane has written of her experiences in the following book:

- Song of the Nightingale, AUTHENTIC PUBLISHING (1 September 2009), ISBN 978-1850788645
