= G-15 (Eritrea) =

Early-2000s Eritrean dissident group opposing President Isaias Afwerki

The G-15 (Group 15) was a group of 15 senior officials from Eritrea's ruling party, the People's Front for Democracy and Justice, who in 2001 authored an open letter criticising President Isaias Afewerki. The letter condemned the President's actions as "illegal and unconstitutional" and called for democratic dialogue and reforms. In September 2001, the government responded by arresting eleven of the signatories, along with eleven independent journalists who had reported on their demands. The Government of Eritrea alleged that this group had committed an act of treason but none have ever been charged for any offence.

== Background ==
In the aftermath of the 1998–2000 war with Ethiopia, an internal dissent movement began to question President Isaias Afwerki's authority. This opposition first manifested publicly in October 2000, when a group of thirteen prominent Eritrean diaspora intellectuals, known as the G-13, sent a confidential letter to the President. They criticised the "advent of one-man dominance" and the government's failure to develop democratic institutions. Concurrently, dissent was growing within the top ranks of the ruling EPLF/PFDJ party itself. Senior political and military leaders, who would later form the G-15, became increasingly concerned that the President had neglected to convene meetings of the party's Central Council and the National Assembly during the war and had failed to organise a new party congress or national elections. This internal party opposition, joined by independent newspapers and civil society representatives, challenged the government's conduct and pushed for a return to a collective leadership model, setting the stage for the G-15's more public challenge in May 2001.

== Open letter ==
In May 2001, the members of the G-15 issued an open letter addressed to all members of the People's Front for Democracy and Justice (PFDJ), the ruling party in Eritrea. The document criticized President Isaias Afwerki for what the authors described as an increasingly authoritarian style of governance following the Eritrea–Ethiopia border war (1998–2000). It demanded the implementation of the ratified but suspended 1997 Constitution, the restoration of democratic practices within the PFDJ, and greater accountability in government decision-making. The letter argued that the concentration of power in the presidency was undermining the collective leadership system established during the independence struggle. It accused Afwerki of marginalizing party institutions, delaying political reform, and fostering a culture of fear and silence.

The core criticism was laid in the following way: 'Because of the weaknesses of the legislative and executive bodies, the President has been acting without restraint, even illegally. While the judiciary lacks adequate human and institutional capacity, instead of providing resources to build up its capacity, the President has created a competing Special Court reporting directly to him. People are being jailed for years without the knowledge and agreement of the judiciary, and independence of the judiciary and rule of law are being violated. The problem is that the President is conducting himself in an illegal and unconstitutional manner, is refusing to consult, and the legislative and executive bodies have not performed their oversight functions properly.'

The justification for publishing the open letter, as argued by the G-15, was to "pave the road for peaceful, legal and democratic transition to a truly constitutional government, and to establish guarantees for Eritrea to become a peaceful and stable nation where democracy, justice and prosperity shall prevail".

Fifteen senior officials of the government and the PFDJ signed the statement. Six of them were part of the EPLF's inner Political Bureau and had served as key figures in the independence war: Ogabe Abraha, Haile Woldetinse (Durue), Petros Solomon, Mesfin Hagos, Berhane Gherezgiher, and Mahmoud Ahmed Sherifo.

== Signatories ==
The list of the G-15 includes 11 signatories who were arrested, and 4 who have been exiled:

Name	Background	Status	Arrest date
Petros Solomon	Former minister of Defense and maritime resources; former (EPLF) chief of intelligence.	Jailed	18 Sep 2001
Mahmoud Ahmed Sherifo	Former foreign minister and minister of local government; chairman of the committee drafting Eritrea's electoral law.	Reportedly died in prison in 2002	18 Sep 2001
Haile Woldense	Former foreign minister and former minister of trade and industry.	Reportedly died in prison in 2018	18 Sep 2001
Mesfin Hagos	Co-founder of the EPLF in 1970. Former Minister of Defense. Abroad for medical reasons during the arrests. He now lives in Germany.	In exile	
Ogbe Abraha	Former chief of staff of the armed forces; former minister of trade and industry; former minister of labor and social welfare.	Reportedly died in prison; Oct 2002	18 Sep 2001
Hamid Himid	Former director of the ministry of foreign affairs; former member of the PFDJ executive council.	Reportedly died in Eila Ero prison; Sep 2003	18 Sep 2001
Saleh Idris Kekya	Former minister of transport and communication; former director of the president's office.	Reportedly died in prison; June 2003	18 Sep 2001
Estifanos Seyoum	Former director-general of inland-revenue.	Reportedly died in prison; Sep 2007	18 Sep 2001
Berhane Ghebrezgabiher	Former commander of the armed forces; former head of the national reserve force.	Jailed	18 Sep 2001
Astier Fesehazion	Former regional head of personnel.(ex)wife of Mahmoud Sherifo	Reportedly died in Eila Ero prison; June 2003	18 Sep 2001
Mohammed Berhan Blata	Former mayor of Mendeferra, Adi Kayih and Dekemhare. Mohammed retracted his involvement in G-15 and was not imprisoned. He later went in exile. He lives now in Sweden.	In exile	
Germano Nati	Former regional director of social affairs.	Reportedly died in prison; Jan 2009	18 Sep 2001
Beraki Gebreselassie	Former minister of information; former minister of education; ambassador to Germany	Reportedly died in prison; 2008-2009	18 Sep 2001
Adhanom Ghebremariam	Attorney General of the State of Eritrea, Ambassador to Sweden and to Nigeria	In exile	
Haile Menkarios	Ambassador to Ethiopia and the OAU. Former Special Representative to the African Union	In exile	

== Government response ==
On 18 and 19 September 2001, shortly after the terrorist attacks in the United States, the Eritrean government moved against the G-15 signatories. Eleven of the fifteen were arrested and have remained in incommunicado detention since then, without trial or formal charges. The government also ordered the closure of all independent newspapers, and arrested 11 independent journalists, including Dawit Isaak. The journalists had covered the political confrontation between the president and the reformers.

== Detentions and exile ==
As of 2001, of the 15 members of the group, 11 were imprisoned, three were living in the United States, and one retracted his affiliation with the group. The 11 members who were imprisoned are thought to be charged with treason. The Central Office of the PFDJ believes that they share, "...a common guilt: at the minimum, abdication of responsibility during Eritrea's difficult hours, at the maximum, grave conspiracy." In Eritrea, the G-15 have never been officially charged or brought before a court of law.

In 2010, a former prison guard claimed that six of the 11 prisoners had died: Ogbe from asthma in 2002, Mahmoud from a neck infection in 2003, and Astier, Germano, Hamid and Salih from "illness and heat exhaustion". Five remained alive but very ill; Haile Woldetensae had lost his sight.

== Reactions ==
The crackdown drew widespread condemnation from international human rights organizations, including Amnesty International and Human Rights Watch, and Reporters Without Borders. Amnesty International named the imprisoned 11 prisoners of conscience and repeatedly called for their release.

In November 2001, Liesbeth Zegveld, an international human rights lawyer, launched a legal case against the State of Eritrea concerning the detentions at the African Commission on Human and People's Rights. In 2003, the commission would issue a report finding the arrests and continued incarcerations to be in violation of articles 2,6,7(1) and 9(2) of the African Charter on Human and Peoples' Rights. The Government of Eritrea responded to the report stating that the delay in bringing prisoners to justice was simply a matter of routine procedure. The final report was adopted in 2005, urging the State of Eritrea to order the immediate release of the 11 detainees.

In February 2007, a case was opened at the UN Working Group on Arbitrary Detention. The Eritrean government's response, dated 29 August 2007, defended its conduct and argued that; "the accused did not get speedy and fair trial yet [..because..] the evidence gathered so far cannot be made public and forwarded to judicial proceeding since the war situation is not yet over".

== Legacy ==
Map of the places of detention in Eritrea identified by the Commission of Inquiry in 2016

Scholars and analysts have described the 2001 open letter as a key moment in Eritrean politics, symbolizing the last significant internal challenge to the personal rule of Isaias Afwerki. The publicity surrounding the arrest of the G-15 members generalized the practice of self-censorship, which had already existed before the 2001 crackdown.

The UN Report of the commission of inquiry on human rights in Eritrea found that since the 2001 crackdown, ''the Government has consistently labelled perceived critics as traitors and repressed any signs of protest''. It found that Eritreans have been punished for,''claiming the enjoyment of fundamental rights and legitimate benefits, for asking questions, for enquiring about the fate of persons perceived as critics by the Government or for discussing about governmental policies''.
