= Elections in Eritrea =

Seats in the National Assembly of Eritrea: People's Front for Democracy and Justice (75) Appointed (75)

There have not been national elections in Eritrea since independence in 1993. In theory, elections choose representatives from the country's six regions for the National Assembly. Elections would also occur to elect representatives for the country's regional assemblies and other posts within the country's districts. However, local elections have been regularly held in the past. Eritrea was the least electoral democracy in Africa in 2023 according to V-Dem Democracy indices with a score of 0.073 out of 1.

== National government ==
The National Assembly of Eritrea (Hagerawi Baito) has 150 members, 75 members that are appointed and 75 members that represent the members of the Central Committee of the People's Front for Democracy and Justice. According to the Inter-Parliamentary Union (IPU), parliament has 150 indirectly elected members. The National Assembly was composed in February 1992. Agence France-Presse reported that Eritreans have elected 399 representatives in the country's six regions in a lengthy process that will lead to the formation of a constituent assembly. The regional elections began on 4 January 1997 in some parts of the country and were completed in others by March 1, 1997. As Eritrea is a one-party state, the People's Front for Democracy and Justice is the only political party permitted to exist. The party controls half of the Eritrean Legislature, the other half being held by independent politicians.

Eritrean national elections were set for 1997 and then postponed until 2001, it was then decided that because 20% of Eritrea's land was under occupation that elections would be postponed until the resolution of the conflict with Ethiopia. Local elections have continued in Eritrea. The most recent round of local government elections were held in May 2003, though to the present Eritrea has failed to hold any national elections.

On further elections, the President's Chief of Staff, Yemane Ghebremeskel said,

"The electoral commission is handling these elections this time round so that may be the new element in this process. The national assembly has also mandated the electoral commission to set the date for national elections, so whenever the electoral commission sets the date there will be national elections. It's not dependent on regional elections, although that might be a very helpful process.
Multipartyism, in general principle yes, it is there but the law on political parties has to be approved by the national assembly. It was not approved the last time. The view from the beginning was that you don't necessarily need a party law to hold national elections. You can have national elections and the party law can be adopted at any time. So in terms of commitment it's very clear, in terms of the process it has its own pace, its own characteristics."

=== President ===
Isaias Afewerki was elected president of Eritrea by the national assembly in 1993. He has been the de facto leader since before independence with no legal opposition to his rule. Presidential elections, planned for 1997, have never been held.

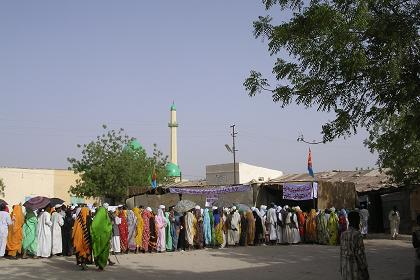
Local elections in Agordat, Eritrea.

== Regional elections ==
Regional and local elections for regional assemblies and local courts took place in all regions of Eritrea in December 2002 and May 2004.

== See also ==
- Electoral calendar
- Electoral system
