= National Security Office (Eritrea) =

Agency

The Eritrean National Security Office or NSO or National Security Agency is an intelligence agency of Eritrea.

== Leadership ==
As of April 2023, the National Security Office is headed by Abraha Kassa, who has led the NSO since 1997 or earlier. In his role as head of NSO, Abraha Kassa led a group of Eritrean generals visiting Ethiopian institutions including the Information Network Security Agency in April 2023.

== Structure ==
The NSO is divided into six offices, each of which is subdivided into Intelligence, Arrests and Interrogations sections.

== Role ==
The National Security Office reports to the Office of the President and is responsible for "detaining persons suspected of threatening national security" according to the United States Department of State. In 2007, NSO agents arrested people at their homes after entering without warrants.

== Actions ==
On ZTV, the NSO was accused, under the leadership of Abraha Kassa and under direct orders from president Isaias Afwerki, of detaining 150 Eritrean Muslims on 23 January 1997 and of executing them from 20:20 on 18 June to 02:00 on 19 June 1997. Mehari Yohannes, a former member of the Eritrea People's Liberation Front who was a security officer in the Asmara prison holding the detainees in June 1997, gave a lower execution count, stating that "nearly 30" Eritreans suspected of being jihadists were executed on 18 June 1997.

== 2021 sanctions ==
On 22 March 2021, the Council of the European Union imposed sanctions against the NSO under Regulation (EU) 2020/1998, stating that NSO was responsible for "arbitrary arrests, extrajudicial killings, enforced disappearances of persons and torture by its agents" in Eritrea. The Eritrean Ministry of Information described the sanctions as "malicious", "trumped-up charges" for "ulterior motives".
