= Berhane Abrehe =

Eritrean politician (1945–2024)

- በርሃነ አብረሀ
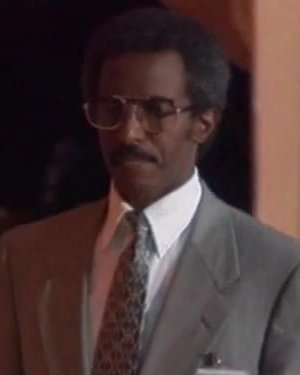
- Abrehe in 1995

Minister of Finance
- In office 2001–2012
- President: Isaias Afwerki
- Preceded by: Ghebreselassie Yoseph
- Succeeded by: Berhane Habtemariam

Personal details
- Born: 1945 Quandeba, British-occupied Eritrea
- Died: 19 August 2024 (aged 78–79) Carshelli prison, Asmara, Eritrea
- Party: PFDJ
- Education: Haile Selassie University; University of Illinois at Urbana-Champaign
- Profession: Civil Engineer and Economist

Berhane Abrehe (Tigrinya: በርሃነ አብረሀ; 1945 – 19 August 2024) was an Eritrean politician who served in various key positions within the government. Born in 1945 in Quandeba, Eritrea, he had a long and distinguished career in Eritrean politics and public service before being arrested in 2018 for criticising the country's president, Isaias Afwerki, and dying in solitary confinement in 2024.

== Career ==
Berhane Abrehe's political journey began during his high school years in Jimma, Ethiopia when he joined the Eritrean Liberation Front (ELF) in 1963. After completing his education at Haile Selassie University in Addis Ababa, he migrated to the United States. In 1970, he became a founding member of the Eritreans for Liberation in North America (EFLNA). In 1972, he obtained a master's degree in civil engineering from the University of Illinois.

He returned to Ethiopia and worked at the Awash Valley Authority before joining the Eritrean People's Liberation Front (EPLF) in 1975, actively participating in the Eritrean War of Independence. Throughout the conflict, he played a significant role in the leadership of the EPLF.

After Eritrea proclaimed independence in May 1993, Abrehe held several important positions within the government. He served as the Minister of Land and Water in the 1990s and later assumed the role of Minister of Finance of Eritrea, serving from 2001 to 2012.

== Criticism of President Afwerki ==
Abrehe's relationship with President Isaias Afwerki deteriorated in 2012 due to the president's interference in the Ministry of Finance. As a result, Berhane Abrehe was removed from his post and was placed on "frozen" status, receiving a government salary but not being permitted to work.

In September 2018, Berhane Abrehe published a controversial two-volume book titled "Hagerey Eritrea" (My Country Eritrea). The book was highly critical of the Eritrean government and called on Eritreans to engage in peaceful protests against its policies. In addition, he issued a challenge on YouTube for President Isaias Afwerki to debate him on Eritrea's future. The book's chapters included titles such as "Isaias The Tornado," "The Establishment of Military Rule in Eritrea," "Organized Corruption," "The Endless Treachery of Mr. Isaias," and "Foiling Dictatorship."

== Imprisonment and death ==
Berhane Abrehe was arrested on 17 September 2018, just a week after the publication of his book. His wife, Almaz Habtemariam, also an EPLF veteran, had been imprisoned a year earlier for assisting one of their sons in fleeing the country. Neither Berhane nor his wife was formally charged with a crime, and no legal representatives or family members were granted access to them after their detention.

Abrehe died on 19 August 2024, having spent six years in solitary confinement in Carshelli prison in Asmara. He was 79.
