= Abraha Asfaha =

Eritrean politician

1st Minister of Construction of Eritrea
- In office 1993–present

1st Minister of Public Works of Eritrea
- In office 1993–present

Personal details
- Party: PFDJ

Abraha Asfaha is Eritrea's Minister of Public Works and Construction, a post he has held since independence.
