= Osman Saleh =

Eritrean government minister

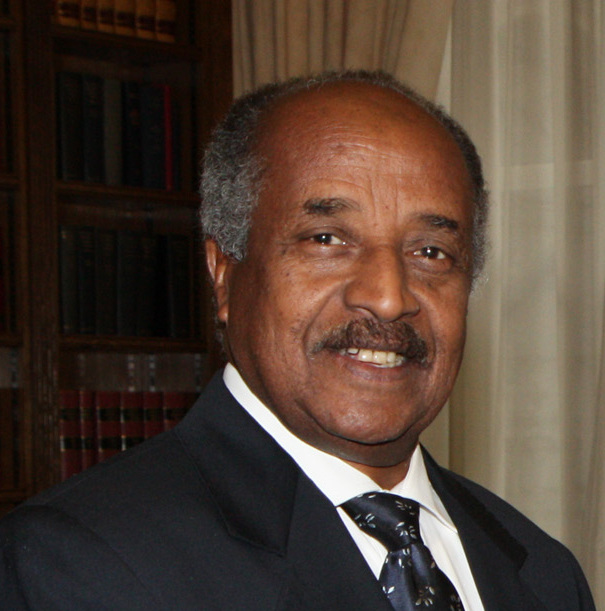
- Saleh in 2012

Minister of Foreign Affairs of Eritrea
- Incumbent
- Assumed office 18 April 2007
- Preceded by: Mohamed Omer

1st Minister of Education
- In office 1993 – 18 April 2007
- Succeeded by: Semere Russom

Personal details
- Born: Osman Saleh Mohammed
- Political party: PFDJ

Osman Saleh Mohammed is an Eritrean politician and diplomat. He served as the first minister of education following independence, serving in that position from 1993 to 2007. He oversaw the transition from the revolutionary EPLF school system to a national education system.

In April 2007, he was chosen to serve as the minister of foreign affairs.

== See also ==
- List of current foreign ministers
