= Mohammed Said Bareh =

Mohammed Said Bareh was an Eritrean political figure. He was formerly the Administrator of Anseba Region and Minister of Foreign Affairs. He died in April 2008 and a state funeral was held for him attended by the president of Eritrea and high level officials who also were his former comrade-in-arms during the armed struggle. He is survived by his wife and three children.
