= High Court of Eritrea =

The High Court of Eritrea is the final court of appeal in Eritrea and the highest court in the Eritrean judicial hierarchy. It has both original and appellate jurisdiction.

A panel of three judges hears all original cases. However, when the High Court is serving final appeals, a panel of five judges hears the trial.

In 2005, The High Court took an average of 2 months to decide if it would hear an appeal, and at year's end had a backlog of approximately 200 cases.

== List of chief justices (post-independence) ==
- Fozia Hashim (1991-1993)
- Teame Beyene (1994-2001)
- Menkerios Beraki (Chief Justice of Eritrea since 2001)
