= Senai Berhane =

Eritrean footballer

Personal information
- Date of birth: 18 April 1989 (age 37)
- Positions: Defender; midfielder

Team information
- Current team: Sundbybergs IK

Senior career*
| Years | Team | Apps | (Gls) |
| 2014– | Sundbybergs IK | | |

International career^{‡}
| 2015 | Eritrea | 2 | (0) |
- * Club domestic league appearances and goals as of 13:36, 4 December 2019 (UTC) ‡ National team caps and goals as of 13:36, 4 December 2019 (UTC)

Senai Berhane (born 18 April 1989) is an Eritrean footballer who plays for Swedish club Sundbybergs IK. He plays as both a defender and a midfielder.
