= Yemane Gebreab =

Eritrean politician

Yemane Gebreab (born 1954) is the Head of Political Affairs and Presidential Adviser of Eritrea. He is also a member of the People's Front for Democracy and Justice (PFDJ), the sole and ruling political party.

Yemane graduated with a bachelor’s degree from the University of Washington in Seattle.

Yemane Gebreab has been Special Advisor to the President of Eritrea and a senior diplomat. He has been on diplomatic meetings in Egypt, Venezuela, Israel, China, Sudan, Russia, and Ethiopia. He also plays a pivotal role at the United Nations in New York.

== General references ==
- "How Eritrea's president rules – all the president's inner circle profiled". Martin Plaut. 15 November 2023.
