= Filipos Woldeyohannes =

Eritrean general

Filipos Woldeyohannes (born 1955) is an Eritrean general who has served as Chief of Staff of the Eritrean Defence Forces since March 2014. He was appointed after his predecessor died in early March 2014.

== Military career ==
Filipos Woldeyohannes was born in Asmara. Filipos served as a commander of the Western front during the Eritrean–Ethiopian War and later served as the commander of Eritrea's Operation Zone 2. In May 2020, following an official visit by Eritrean President Isaias Afwerki to Ethiopia, Filipos visited the country over an issue of "mutual concern" to the two countries, according to Eritrean media cited by Borkena.

== Sanctions for human rights violations ==
In August 2021, the United States announced sanctions against Filipos for war crimes in the Tigray War, including the torture and execution of civilians, sexual violence as a weapon of war and a scorched earth policy of looting and destruction attributed to Eritrean forces. Filipos is being targeted for his role as "leader of an entity engaged in serious human rights violations committed during the current conflict in Tigray," as stated by the US Treasury under the Magnitsky Act.
