= Askalu Menkerios =

Minister of Tourism

Personal details
- Party: PFDJ

Askalu Menkerios is the current Minister of Tourism and former Minister of Labor and Social Welfare of Eritrea.
