= Ministry of Finance (Eritrea) =

Government ministry of Eritrea

The Ministry of Finance of Eritrea is responsible for the public finance policies of Eritrea. The ministry is located in Asmara.

== Ministers of Finance ==
- Haile Woldense, 1993–1997
- Ghebreselassie Yoseph, 1997–2001
- Berhane Abrehe, 2001–2014
- Berhane Habtemariam, 2014–

== See also ==
- Finance ministry
- Economy of Eritrea
- Government of Eritrea
