= Ministry of National Development (Eritrea) =

Government ministry of Eritrea

The Ministry of National Development (MND) in Eritrea has a mandate to plan and coordinate programs and projects at the sectoral and regional levels or to coordinate their implementation and to conduct management audit of ministries, departments and strategic public enterprises. The Ministry grew out of the Office of Macro Policy within the Office of the President.

The first Minister of National Development is Dr. Woldai Futur. The current Minister, however, is Dr Giorgis Tesfamichael. See attached speech by Dr Giorgis on government position on development cooperation:
