= Eritrean Navy =

Maritime warfare branch of Eritrea's military

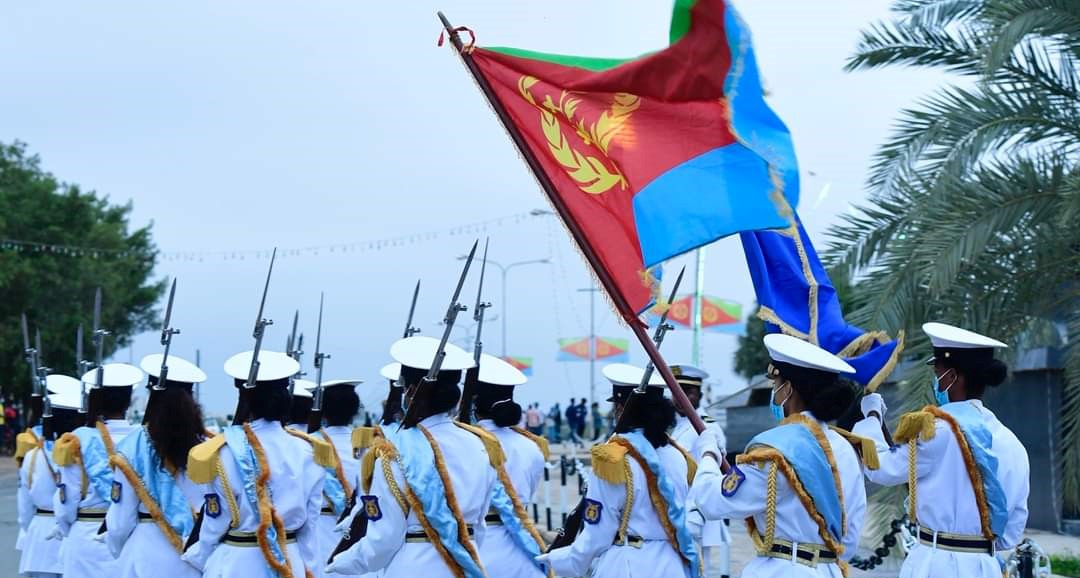
Parade during Martyrs' Day, 2023

The Eritrean Navy (officially the Eritrean Naval Force) is a smaller branch of the Eritrean Defence Forces. It is responsible for the security of the entire coastline of Eritrea, more than 1,100 km, as well as the Eritrean territorial waters.

== History ==
The Eritrean Navy of today is said to have been an outgrowth of the Eritrean Liberation Front's sea transport operations early in the Eritrean War of Independence. This continued as a part of the Eritrean People's Liberation Front (EPLF) after the split of the organizations. After the Second Congress of the EPLF an offensive force was proposed and created with a base in Sudan.

These forces played a critical role in the Second Battle of Massawa when they sank several Ethiopian warships in the harbor. At the close of the Eritrean War of Independence, the balance of the Ethiopian Navy was inherited by this naval force.

== Currently ==
Since independence the Eritrean Navy has expanded its fleet of high-speed patrol boats. This branch of the Eritrean Defence Forces served with distinction under the command of Tewolde Kelati. The current Commander of the Eritrean Naval Forces is Major General Hummed Mohammed Karikare. The Eritrean Naval Forces Headquarters is in Massawa. Through Proclamation 104 the Eritrean Navy is empowered by the Ministry of the Fisheries to enforce fisheries-related laws on behalf of the Ministry.

== Ships ==
Origin	Type	In service	Notes
Israel	IAI Super Dvora Mk II patrol boat	6	
Soviet Union	Vostochnaya Verf Osa-class missile boats (Osa II in service)	5	
United States	Sewart Seacraft Swift ship Patrol boats	3	
	35 Ton Patrol boats	4	
Germany	Large Ex-German LCU	1	
Soviet Union	T-4-class LCU	2	
France	EDIC-class LCT	1	ex-Turkish
Israel	Ashdod-class LCT	1	

== Weapons ==
- Israel Gabriel SSM
- Soviet Union SS-N-2 Styx SSM

== Facilities ==
- Massawa - Naval HQ
- Assab - ship repair facility
- Embaticalla - former marine commando training school
- Dahlak
