= Eritrean Army =

Ground military force of Eritrea

- Founded: 1991
- Country: Eritrea
- Type: Army
- Role: Land warfare
- Size: 250,000–300,000 (including conscripts and militia) Military age: 18 Conscription Both men and women 18 years of age are required to perform national service. Conscription was made open ended in 1998 with no set term and many served for more than a decade, but in 2014 the government set 18 months as the limit for national service. Budget: $290 million (2006) Percent of GDP: 6.3% (2006)
- Engagements: Eritrean War of Independence; Hanish Islands conflict Second Sudanese Civil War; First Congo War; Eritrean–Ethiopian War; Djiboutian–Eritrean border conflict Tigray War

Commanders
- Minister of Defense: General Sebhat Ephrem
- Army Chief of Staff: General Philipos Woldeyohannes

The Eritrean Army is the main branch of the Eritrean Defence Forces and is one of the largest armies in Africa. The main role of the army in Eritrea is defense from external aggressors, border security, and developing national cohesion. Historically, the predecessor of the Eritrean Army, the Eritrean People's Liberation Front (EPLF), played a major role in establishing and defending the country's independence from Ethiopia in 1991 during the Eritrean War of Independence. Since then, the army has continued to be involved in low-level border conflicts with Ethiopia and several other neighbors, including Djibouti and Yemen, with the most notable one being the Ethiopian-Eritrean War from 1998 until 2000, which ended in a partial Ethiopian military victory and Eritrean boundary line victory. It is widely regarded as one of the largest armies in Africa, despite the country having a smaller population than most of its neighbors with around 250,000 to 300,000 personnel due to mandatory national service. Conscription became open ended since the war with Ethiopia and no demobilization has taken place.

== History ==
The current Eritrean army is an outgrowth of the revolutionary Eritrean People's Liberation Front (EPLF). The trial by fire experienced by the EPLF during the Eritrean War of Independence created a force that was able to contend with the largest armed force on the African continent. When Eritrea gained independence, the country's military was admired as one of the most effective fighting forces not only in Africa but the world.

During the Eritrean struggle for independence the EPLF fought several large scale battles towards the end of the war. The most decisive were the Battle of Afabet in 1988 and the Battle of Massawa in 1990. These battles saw the collision of major units of the EPLF versus a conventional armed force.

Since its independence in 1992, Eritrea has taken part in multiple wars and clashes with its neighbors. Most notably the war with Ethiopia and border conflict with Djibouti. Especially with Djibouti Eritrea have had several wars and clashes within the last two decades. Most recently in 2008 relations between Eritrea and Djibouti were driven to a point where war was imminent, but avoided without full-scale war. The Eritrean Army was also involved in the Second Sudanese Civil War during which the Eritrean government supported and organised various anti-Sudanese rebel groups. Most notably, the Eritrean military provided the SPLA rebels with weaponry, training, and intelligence. In some cases, the Eritreans even sent covert expeditionary forces into Sudan to directly fight alongside the insurgents against the Sudanese Armed Forces, for example in Operation Thunderbolt (1997). Furthermore, the Eritrean Army sent one of its battalions to fight in the First Congo War due to Eritrea's alliance with Rwanda at the time. The Eritreans took part in the entire campaign, fighting with the pro-AFDL alliance and covering over 1,500 km. According to the Horn of Africa journalist Martin Plaut, this was "an extraordinary feat, especially for soldiers who walked the entire distance in gumboots, with little or no logistical support". By the end of the war, the Eritrean contingent was starving, exhausted, and ill; it had suffered numerous casualties due to the adverse conditions of the country.

== Organization ==
Information on the structure and formations of the Eritrean Army is hard to obtain as units are frequently shifted around and reorganized to prevent them from forming loyalties to commanders. In 1992, the President formed a working group of former officers of the Ethiopian Armed Forces to suggest the structure of the new Eritrean military. They recommended that the Army should be based on divisions, each headed by a colonel, with the chief of staff being a major general, and a civilian minister of defense. The working group recommended that the military be professionalized and institutionalized, maintaining small numbers due to Eritrea's limited resources and small size. President Isaias Afwerki ignored most of their advice, however, and promoted 37 former combatants of the war for independence to the general officer ranks. This hampered the development of the military as an institution and was done so that he could play them off against each other and maintain the army's loyalty to him personally. Due to the president frequently shifting the organization and assignments of senior commanders and chiefs of staff, as well as the lack of official documents recording them, putting together a complete picture of the structure of the Eritrean Army is difficult and largely relies on reports from former senior military officers.

In February 1991 the divisions of the EPLA were subordinated to four corps, the 161st, 271st, 381st, and 491st. During the 1990s there were a total of 24 divisions.

Since 2001 the army has undergone extensive reforms and resulted in the establishment of regional military command zones, which themselves are frequently changed. Currently, as of the late 2000s, the Eritrean ground forces are organized into four corps consisting of twenty infantry brigades, one mechanized brigade, and one commando division (the latter two had been created in 1991). The sources are unclear on whether the four corps still exist or not. There is also a Presidential Guard which includes three units of about 2,000 men. These serve as the president's personal security and are given better pay and equipment, also being used to guard political prisoners. In total these forces are estimated to number between 250,000 and 300,000 men, including large numbers of conscripts between the ages of eighteen and fifty. These forces are divided among five command zones, as defined in 1965 by the supreme council of the Eritrean Liberation Front. Each zone is headed by a general, who reportedly have gained considerable political power at the expense of the local civil administrations since the war with Ethiopia. Deputy commanders of zones are selected for their loyalty to President Isaias Afwerki, who uses them to maintain control. The zones include the following: Gasha-Barka (Zone 1), West (Zone 2), South (Zone 3), East (Zone 4), Center (Zone 5). Asmara, the capital, is included in the latter zone. Later on these zones were reformed into three new ones, the Central, Eastern, and Western fronts. A military training camp is located near Assab. Large forces are still kept near the disputed Ethiopian border.

In 2012 the government has taken an extra measure of establishing a "people's militia" for the older segment of the population, men aged sixty and women aged seventy, and under.

Since the military region commanders report directly to the President the office of Defense Minister is largely ceremonial.

=== National service ===
Given the frequent border conflicts between Eritrea and its neighbors, the army's numbers have always been maintained through conscription with the proclamation on the Eritrean National Service, for both men and women between the ages of 18 and 40, a policy officially introduced by President Afwerki in 1995. Thus Eritrea has remained in a state of mobilization since the wars with Ethiopia. According to a US State Department information sheet from October 2007 Eritrean national service consists of "approximately six months of military training, followed by a number of years in military or other government service." Besides national defense conscripts also spend peacetime working on public construction projects. They get paid no more than $30 a month. There is no term limit for national service, having been made open-ended in 1998. Although the average term lasts about six years there are individual cases of soldiers who reported being forced to serve for more than a decade. The large number of troops has also had some effect on the Eritrean economy. Reportedly, many conscripts live in terrible conditions and are essentially used for slave labor, subjected to severe physical punishments for trying to escape, and are at the mercy of their commanders. There were many cases of female conscripts being sexually abused. Requests to leave are met with arrests, detainment, and even torture. As a result, they suffer from morale problems and some Eritreans even leave the country to dodge the draft. By 2017 the numbers of Eritreans fleeing the draft to other countries has reached the thousands.

Desertion has become such a serious problem that entire companies have been "hollowed out" and reduced to the size of platoons as large numbers have soldiers and junior officers have fled, often to either neighboring Sudan or to a lesser extent, Ethiopia. Many reservists have refused to attend regular military drills. To address this, in 2014 the Eritrean government of President Afwerki has pledged to enforce an eighteen-month limit for national service, though there is skepticism on whether or not the promise will actually be implemented. The government has stated that the duration of national service is necessary due to the continued hostilities and illegal occupation of Eritrean territory by Ethiopia.

In 2015, a UN report documented extensive human rights abuses within the Eritrean army and stated:

Indeed, the indefinite duration of national service, its terrible conditions — including arbitrary detention, torture, sexual torture, forced labour, absence of leave and the ludicrous pay — and the implications it has for the possibility of any individual to found a family, conduct a family life and have favourable conditions of work make national service an institution where slavery-like practices are routine.

Many Eritrean draft dodgers fled to Europe and Israel since the beginning of the European migrant crisis. Since 2002, Eritrean youths are forced to do unlimited military service which includes forced labor. In September the same year, Eritrean government arrested leading journalists and leaving only the pro government media to work.

== Ranks and insignia ==
Commissioned Officers

Rank group	General / flag officers		Senior officers			Junior officers
Eritrean Army
Eritrean Army	Major general	Brigadier general	Colonel	Lieutenant colonel	Major	Captain	First lieutenant	Second lieutenant

Enlisted

Rank group	Senior NCOs			Junior NCOs	Enlisted
Eritrean Army						No insignia
Eritrean Army	Master Sergeant	Staff Sergeant	Sergeant	Corporal	Private first class	Private

== Sources ==
=== Books ===
- Connell, Dan (August 1998). "Sudan: Global Trade, Local Impact. Arms Transfers to all Sides in the Civil War in Sudan" (PDF). Human Rights Watch. 10 (4 (A)).
- Kibreab, Gaim (2017). The Eritrean National Service: Servitude for 'the Common Good' and the Youth Exodus. Boydell & Brewer. ISBN 9781847011602.
- Plaut, Martin (2016). Understanding Eritrea: Inside Africa's Most Repressive State. Oxford: Oxford University Press. ISBN 9780190669591.
