= Community Courts of Eritrea =

The Community Courts of Eritrea are the foundation of the judicial system in Eritrea. The courts typically hear cases regarding minor infractions, typically involving sums of less than approximately $7,300 (100 thousand nakfa).

Individual cases are heard by an individual magistrate. Defense counsels are permitted to present cases but are typically appointed by the court because defendants are rarely able to meet the cost of private representation.

Community magistrates are elected from the communities which they will serve. These courts are supervised by the Ministry of Justice. The community courts tend to promote out-of-court settlements and have a small (2.9%) appeal rate.
