= Constitution of Eritrea =

Supreme law of Eritrea

The Constitution of Eritrea (Tigrinya: ቅዋም ኤርትራ) is the supreme law of the State of Eritrea. It provides the legal foundation for the existence of the State and source of legal authority. It sets out the rights and duties of its citizens, and defines the structure of government. Despite its ratification by the legislature, the constitution has yet to be implemented as of 2025.

== Overview ==
In March 1994, the Provisional Government of Eritrea established a Constitutional Commission to draft a new constitution. The drafting authority was the transitional National Assembly, a body consisting of 75 members of the EPLF central committee and 75 representatives elected by regional assemblies.

In 1995, a global symposium was held in Asmara for the writing of the Constitution of Eritrea. Eritrean representatives worked closely on the legislation with a number of international experts, including Somali scholars Ismail Ali Ismail and Said Sheikh Samatar. The following year, Ismail also helped train senior government officials in the Eritrean capital.

After 27 months, the resulting constitution was introduced to the National Assembly in 1997. The constitution was ratified. As of 2025, it had not been fully implemented, and general elections had not been held, despite the ratification of an election law in 2002.

The Eritrean constitution calls for legislative, executive, and judicial branches of government. According to the constitution, a 150-seat unicameral legislature, the National Assembly, decides internal and external policy, approves the budget, and elects the president of the country. As of 2025, the National Assembly had not met since 2002, and legislative and executive powers are effectively held by President Isaias Afwerki.
