= Berhane Habtemariam =

Eritrean politician

- በርሃነ ሀብተማርአም

4th Minister of Finance of Eritrea
- Incumbent
- Assumed office 2014
- Preceded by: Berhane Abrehe

1st Auditor-General of Eritrea
- In office 1993–?

Personal details
- Profession: Accountant

Berhane Habtemariam (Tigrinya: በርሃነ ሀብተማርአም) is an Eritrean politician. He has been Minister of Finance of Eritrea since 2014. He was the first Auditor-General of Eritrea. He was trained as an accountant in the United Kingdom.

In January 2007 he was awarded a special commendation for promoting ethics and professionalism in his capacity as Auditor-General. He was the first African to receive this award.
