= National Assembly (Eritrea) =

Unicameral legislature of Eritrea

National Assembly: ሃገራዊ ባይቶ (Tigrinya); الجمعية الوطنية (Arabic)

Type
- Type: Unicameral

History
- Founded: 1 February 1994
- Disbanded: 2 February 2002 (de facto)

Leadership
- President of the National Assembly: Isaias Afwerki, People's Front for Democracy and Justice since 24 May 1993

Structure
- Seats: 150
- Political groups: People's Front for Democracy and Justice (75); Appointed (75)
- Length of term: 5 years

Elections
- Voting system: None

Meeting place
- Asmara, Zoba Maekel; State of Eritrea

Constitution
- Constitution of Eritrea (not enforced)

The National Assembly (Tigrinya: ሃገራዊ ባይቶ, romanized: Hagerawi Baito) is the de jure supreme representative and legislative body of the State of Eritrea. Established under the unimplemented 1997 Constitution, it was intended to be composed of representatives elected by the people through secret ballot. The National Assembly was to serve as the primary legislative authority, tasked with enacting laws and representing the interests of the Eritrean people. However, the National Assembly ceased to function in 2002. Since then, Eritrea has been governed by presidential decree, with no national legislative elections ever taking place.

The National Assembly has 150 members:

- 75 members appointed (consisting mostly of representatives ostensibly elected by the general population, of whom at least 11 must be women, and 15 members representing Eritreans living abroad).
- 75 members representing the members of the Central Committee of the People's Front for Democracy and Justice (PFDJ), the sole legal party of Eritrea.

According to the IPU, the National Assembly has 150 indirectly elected members. The National Assembly was composed in 1994, and its meeting place is located in Asmara.

AFP reported that Eritreans have elected 399 representatives in the country's six regions in a lengthy process that would lead to the formation of a constituent assembly, with the regional elections beginning on 4 January 1997 in some parts of the country and completed in others by 1 March 1997. As of 2026, direct elections had never been held: elections planned for 2001 were continuously postponed before being cancelled altogether. As of 2016, the National Assembly was described by the Office of the United Nations High Commissioner for Human Rights as non-existent, having not convened since January 2002. In practice, President Isaias Afwerki exercises legislative powers in addition to the executive functions granted by the constitution.

== Background ==
While Eritrea was federated to Ethiopia, from 1952 to 1962, the Eritrean Assembly was the legislative body. Eritrea has a one-party national Assembly governed by People's Front for Democracy and Justice (PFDJ) (originally the Eritrean People's Liberation Front (EPLF)). From the time of independence since May 1991, the country has been continuing with a transitional government elected during the elections in June 1993; the scheduled elections from 2001 have been postponed indefinitely.

The regional and local elections are conducted on a periodic basis on a restricted framework, with all men and women of any ethnic or religious background are eligible to vote. Only individuals, not parties, are allowed to contest the elections, which are presided over by representatives from PDFJ. Policy decisions must be focused on the party mandate.

== Qualification ==
The composition of the 150 members of the National Assembly is members from the Central Committee members of the ruling PFDJ and 75 others elected from the 527 member Constituent Assembly in 1997. The elections were held for a transitional government to discuss and ratify the new constitution. The stipulation set for the 75 elected members were: a minimum of 11 women members and minimum of 15 members representing expat Eritreans.

The National Assembly’s term was constitutionally set at five years, with its first session required to convene within one month after a general election. In cases of a state of emergency, its term could be extended for up to six months by a two-thirds majority vote.

== Constitutional powers ==
The President of Eritrea was intended to be elected by the National Assembly from among its members, requiring an absolute majority vote. Candidates would need the nomination of at least 20% of the Assembly’s members, and the President’s term was set at five years, with a two-term limit. In the event of a vacancy, the President of the National Assembly was to serve as acting President for no more than 30 days, pending the election of a successor. The National Assembly also had the power to remove the President of the State by a two-thirds majority for constitutional violations, misconduct, or incapacity.

In May 1997, the new constitution was adopted, which enabled only the 75 elected members needed in the National Assembly, while 75 others from the PFDJ were nominated from the Central Committee; the members of the transitional assembly were allowed to continue until next elections were held.

The National Assembly was scheduled to meet every six months, or at points of emergency at the behest of President and two-thirds of the members. The Cabinet of Ministers was to report to the National Assembly, which was set as the top most legislative body of the Constitution of Eritrea, and needed to assure the fundamental rights of the citizens of the country and to ensure justice, peace and stability. The National Assembly was also set to oversee the Executive Branch of the government during the regime of the transitional government. The other major functions of the National Assembly included the approval of budgets, governing domestic and foreign policies, and regulating the policies of the Cabinet of Ministers.

The President of the National Assembly was intended to be elected by an absolute majority of all members during the first meeting of each five-year session, as outlined in Article 34 of the unimplemented 1997 Constitution. The President's role was to convene and preside over sessions, oversee the operations of standing and ad hoc committees, and supervise the Secretariat of the National Assembly during recess. The President could be removed by an absolute majority vote of the Assembly.

== See also ==
- Politics of Eritrea
- List of legislatures by country
- Legislative branch
