= People's Front for Democracy and Justice =

Political party in Eritrea

People's Front for Democracy and Justice ህዝባዊ ግንባር ንደሞክራስን ፍትሕን
- Abbreviation: PFDJ
- Chairperson: Isaias Afwerki
- Secretary: Yemane Gebreab
- Founded: 16 February 1994 (32 years, 233 days)
- Preceded by: Eritrean People's Liberation Front
- Headquarters: Asmara
- Newspaper: Shabait
- Youth wing: Young People's Front for Democracy and Justice
- Armed wing: Eritrean Defence Forces
- Ideology: Eritrean nationalism; Left-wing nationalism; Civic nationalism Secularism; Socialism; Militarism; Totalitarianism
- Political position: Left-wing
- International affiliation: For the Freedom of Nations!
- National Assembly: 75 / 150 (50%)

Party flag

Website
- shaebia.org (Archived)

The People's Front for Democracy and Justice (Tigrinya: ህዝባዊ ግንባር ንደሞክራስን ፍትሕን, romanized: Həzbawi Gənbar Nǝdämokrasǝn Fǝtḥǝn, PFDJ) is the founding and sole ruling party of the State of Eritrea. The successor to the Marxist–Leninist Eritrean People's Liberation Front (EPLF), the PFDJ regards itself as a left-wing nationalist party, though it holds itself open to nationalists of any political affiliation. The leader of the party and current President of Eritrea is Isaias Afwerki. The PFDJ has been described as totalitarian, and under its rule Eritrea reached the status of the least electorally democratic country in Africa according to V-Dem Democracy indices in 2023.

== Creation ==
The Eritrean People's Liberation Front (EPLF), later (from 1994) People's Front for Democracy and Justice, was formed from the secessionist movement that successfully fought for the creation of an independent Eritrean nation out of the northernmost province of Ethiopia in 1993.

The historical region of Eritrea had joined Ethiopia as an autonomous unit in 1952. The Eritrean Liberation Movement was founded in 1958 and was succeeded by the Eritrean Liberation Front (ELF) in 1961. The ELF grew in membership when the Ethiopian emperor Haile Selassie abolished Eritrea's autonomous status, annexing it as a province in 1962. In the 1960s and 1970s, the ELF undertook a systematic campaign of guerrilla warfare against the Ethiopian government. A faction of the ELF broke away in 1970 to form the Eritrean People's Liberation Front. The EPLF managed to secure control of much of the Eritrean countryside and build effective administrations in the areas it controlled. The fighting that broke out between the EPLF, ELF, and other Eritrean rebel groups in 1981 prevented further military gains, but the EPLF subsequently emerged as the principal Eritrean guerrilla group.

As Soviet support of Ethiopia's socialist government collapsed in the late 1980s, the EPLF allied with guerrilla groups in Tigray province and other parts of Ethiopia. After the holding of a United Nations-supervised referendum on independence there in April 1993, the EPLF declared the new nation of Eritrea the following month.

At the third congress of the EPLF Front in February 1994, delegates voted to transform the 95,000‐person organization into a mass political movement, the People's Front for Democracy and Justice (PFDJ). The congress gave the PFDJ a transitional mandate to draw the general population into the political process and to prepare the country for constitutional democracy.

The leader of the PFDJ party and current President of Eritrea is Isaias Afewerki.

== Post-independence ==
Eritrea formed itself from a referendum with high voter participation. EPLF provisioned education, health, and other public services to save women, workers, and peasants from poverty and oppression. As a consequence, both domestic and foreign media expressed high hopes that Eritrea would develop a self-governed and democratic government. EPLF leaders at the time were perceived as a “new generation” of African leaders. They enjoyed high popularity rates among their constituents. They endorsed democracy and human rights. They defined clear development policies based on their priorities.

In 1994, the PFDJ established a transitional 150-member National Assembly to determine the pending constitution and elections. The assembly later chose the PFDJ's secretary-general and the former EPLF leader, Isaias Afwerki, as Eritrea's president, and formed a cabinet around him. In 1997, the National Assembly adopted a constitution for a multi-party democratic system. It scheduled multi-party elections for 1997. The new government appeared to practice separation of powers. However, the political institutions other than the executive office – the cabinet of ministers, a temporary parliament, and a nominally independent judiciary – did not actually pose checks on the executive power. The cabinet did not provide a platform for debates. The military remained under the president's control. The PFDJ has not held a party convention since January 2002.

== Control of the Judiciary ==
After independence, the PFDJ regime adopted the law of the ousted Ethiopian regime with some amendments to maintain law and order and avoid a legal vacuum. A committee of former senior fighters reviewed the old Ethiopian law regime to adapt the law to the newly formed state and make it compatible with the values and principles of the EPLF. Reviews revealed that basic principles of human rights and procedures of due process and models of judicial independence were not emphasized.

== Status ==
The People's Front for Democracy and Justice is the sole legal party in Eritrea.

There is some debate as to whether PFDJ is a true political party or whether it is a broad governing association in transition. Some observers perceive the PFDJ as a fairly amorphous, diffuse, transitional organization, and a nationalist umbrella.

== Eritrean Militarism ==
The first attempt of the PFDJ to influence the country's norms and values system immediately after the end of the independence war failed because the fighters were in the minority. The 1998–2000 border conflicts with Ethiopia presented the PFDJ with a second chance to impose its ideology on the society.

== U.S. sanctions ==
On 12 November 2021, the U.S. Department of the Treasury's Office of Foreign Assets Control added the PFDJ to its Specially Designated Nationals (SDN) list for being "a political party that has engaged in, or whose members have engaged in, activities that have contributed to the crisis in northern Ethiopia or have obstructed a ceasefire or peace process to resolve such crisis". However on 19 September 2026, the sanctions are lifted.

== See also ==
- Eritrean–Ethiopian War
- Politics of Eritrea
- Human rights in Eritrea
- Religion in Eritrea
