= Outline of Eritrea =

Country in the Horn of Africa

The Flag of Eritrea

The Coat of arms of Eritrea

The location of Eritrea

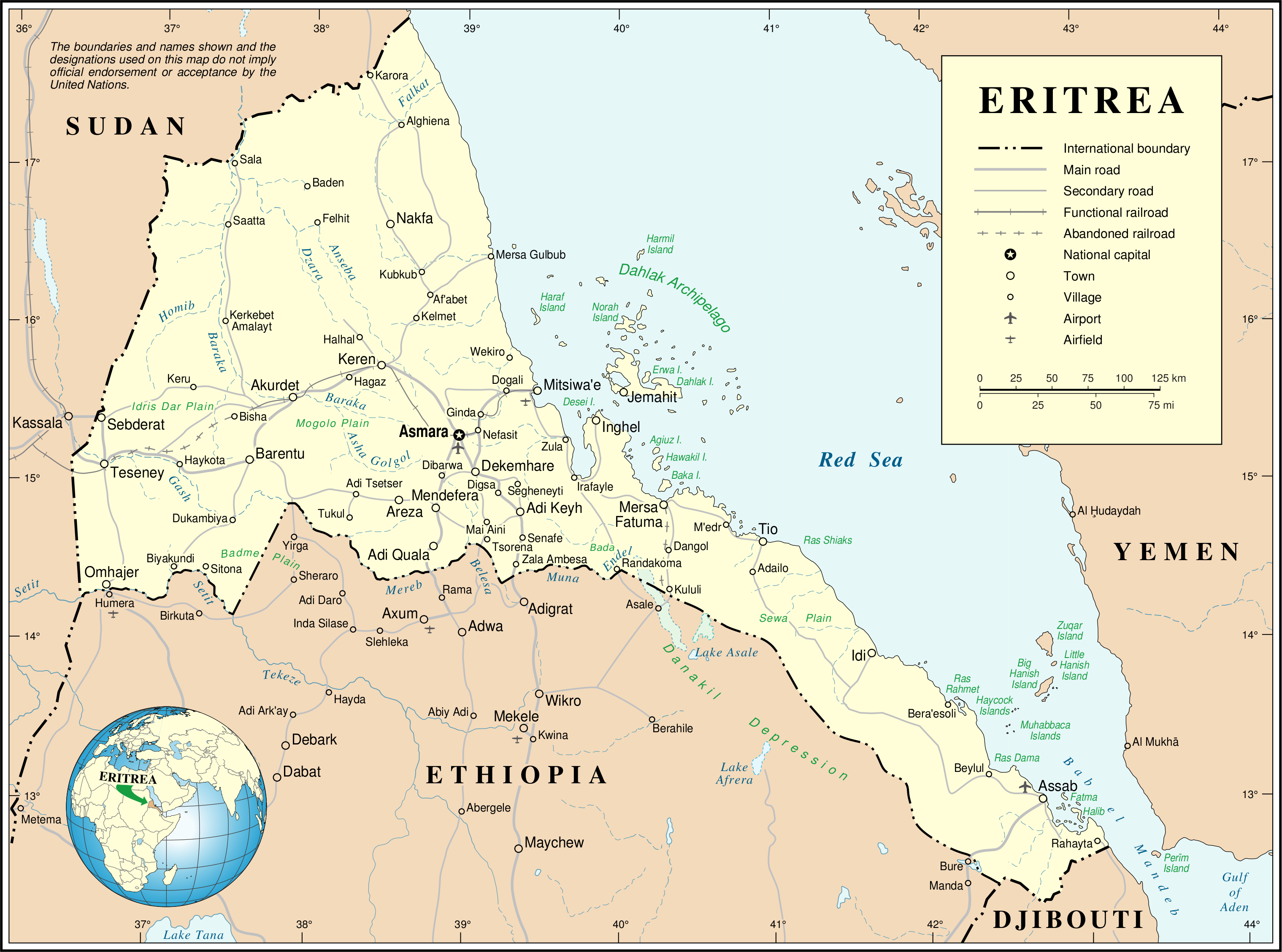
An enlargeable map of the State of Eritrea

Eritrea is a country in the Horn of Africa. Eritrea is the Italian form of the Greek name Ἐρυθραίᾱ (Erythraíā), meaning "red [land]". With its capital at Asmara, it is bordered by Sudan in the west, Ethiopia in the south, and Djibouti in the southeast. The northeastern and eastern parts of Eritrea have an extensive coastline along the Red Sea, directly across from Saudi Arabia and Yemen. The nation has a total area of approximately 117,600 km^{2} (45,406 sq mi), and includes the Dahlak Archipelago and several of the Hanish Islands.

Eritrea is a multi-ethnic country, with nine recognized ethnic groups. It has a population of around six million inhabitants. Most residents speak Afro-Asiatic languages, either of the Semitic or Cushitic branches. Among these communities, the Biher-Tigrinya make up about 55% of the population, with the Tigre constituting around 30% of inhabitants. In addition, there are a number of Nilo-Saharan-speaking Nilotic ethnic minorities. Most people in the territory adhere to Christianity or Islam.

== General reference ==
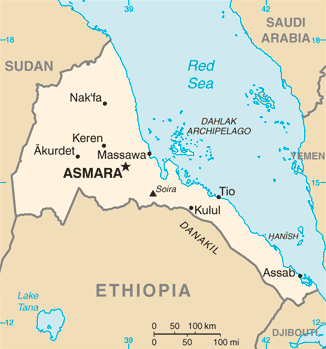
An enlargeable basic map of Eritrea

- Pronunciation: /ɛrɪˈtriːə/ or /ɛrɪˈtreɪ.ə/
- Common English country name: Eritrea
- Official English country name: The State of Eritrea
- Common endonym(s):
- Official endonym(s):
- Adjectival(s): Eritrean
- Demonym(s): Eritrean(s)
- ISO country codes: ER, ERI, 232
- ISO region codes: See ISO 3166-2:ER
- Internet country code top-level domain: .er

== Geography of Eritrea ==
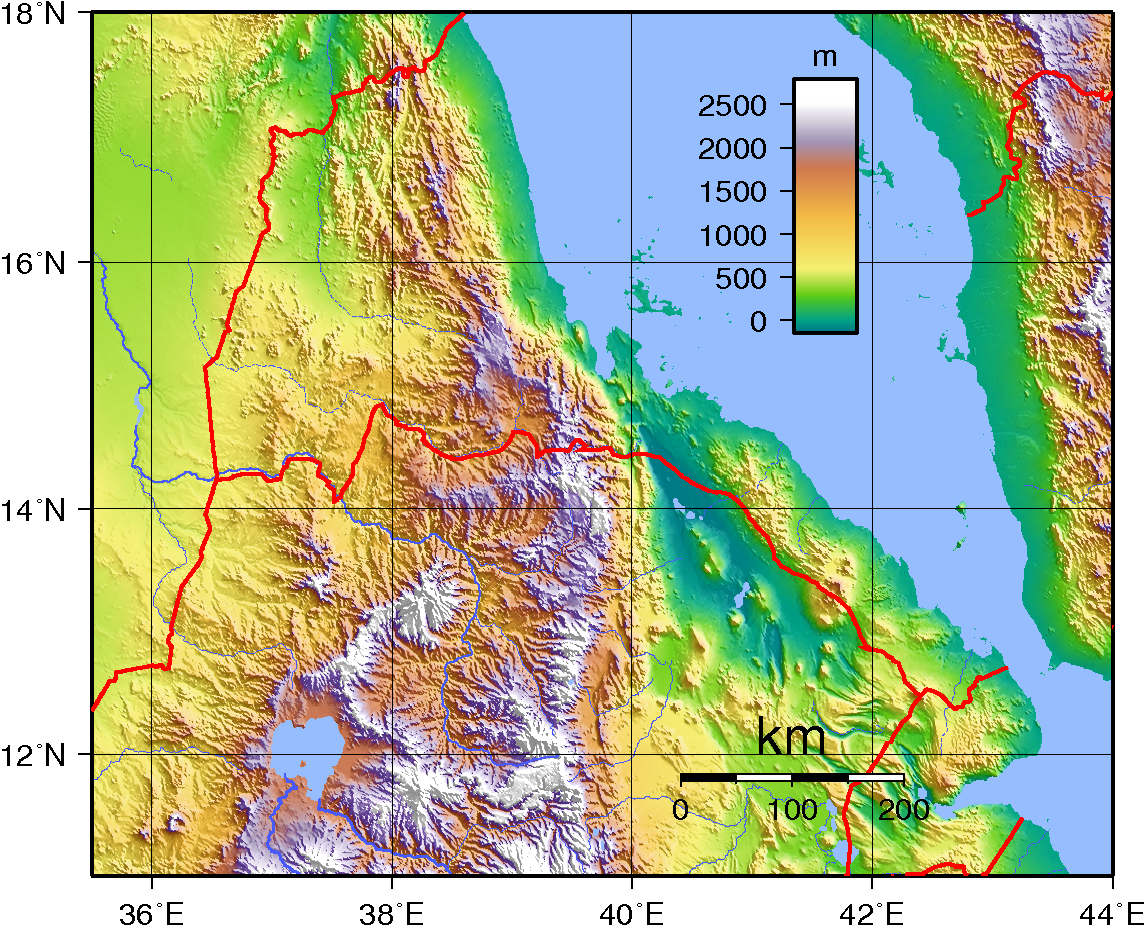
An enlargeable topographic map of Eritrea

Geography of Eritrea

- Eritrea is: a country
- Location:
  - Eastern Hemisphere and Northern Hemisphere
  - Africa
    - North Africa
    - East Africa
      - Horn of Africa
  - Time zone: East Africa Time (UTC+03)
  - Extreme points of Eritrea
    - High: Emba Soira 3,018 m (9,902 ft)
    - Low: Lake Kulul −75 m (−246 ft)
  - Land boundaries: 1,626 km

Ethiopia 912 km
Sudan 605 km
Djibouti 109 km

- Coastline: Red Sea 2,234 km

- Population of Eritrea: 6,333,000 (July 2013 UN estimate) 107th most populous country
- Area of Eritrea: 117,600 km^{2}
- Atlas of Eritrea

=== Environment of Eritrea ===
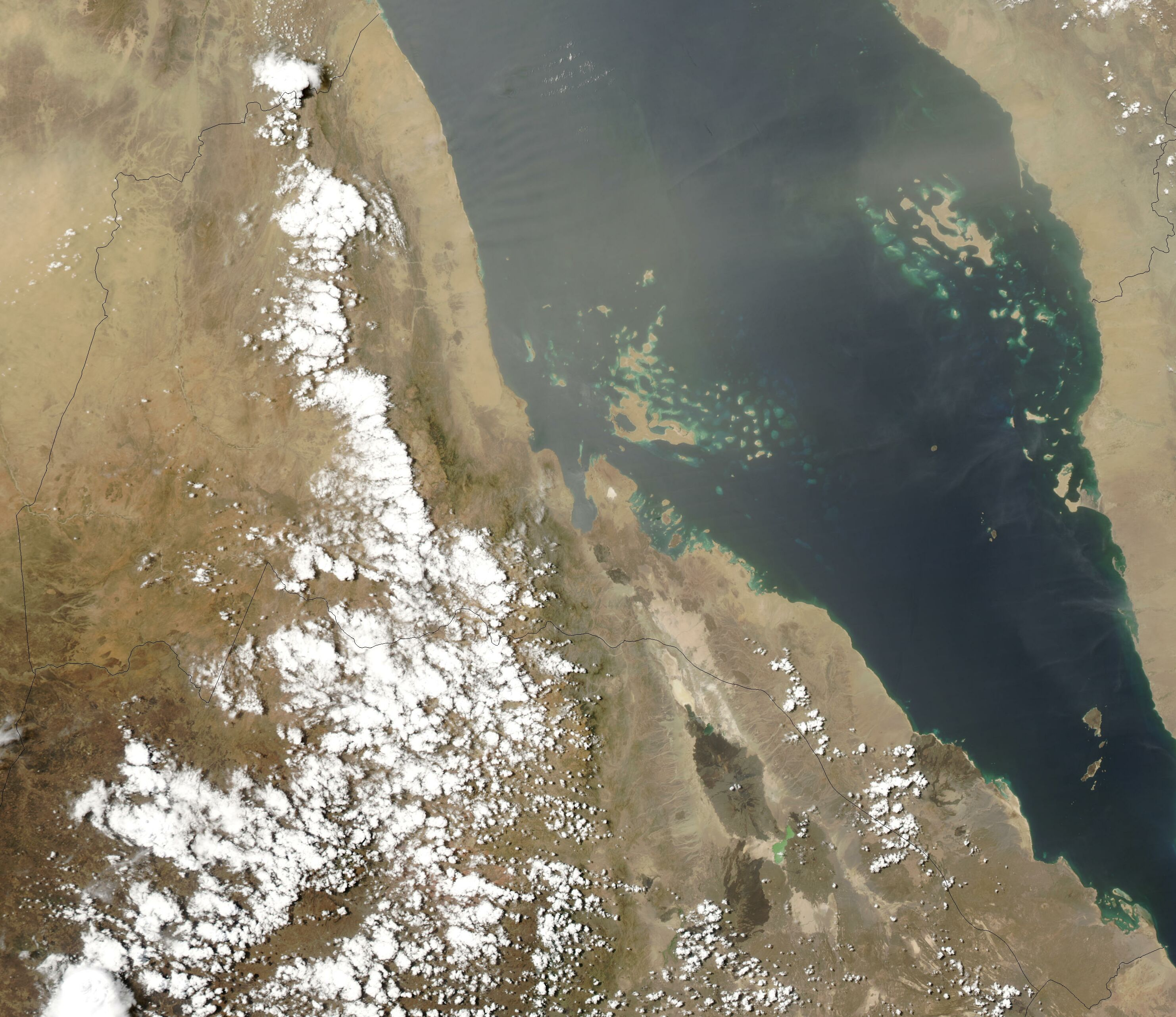
An enlargeable satellite image of Eritrea

Environment of Eritrea

- Climate of Eritrea
- Environmental issues in Eritrea
- Ecoregions in Eritrea
- Geology of Eritrea
  - Earthquakes in Eritrea
- Protected areas of Eritrea
  - National parks of Eritrea
- Wildlife of Eritrea
  - Fauna of Eritrea
    - Birds of Eritrea
    - Mammals of Eritrea

==== Natural geographic features of Eritrea ====
- Glaciers in Eritrea: none
- Islands of Eritrea
- Mountains of Eritrea
  - Volcanoes in Eritrea
- Rivers of Eritrea
- World Heritage Sites in Eritrea: None

=== Regions of Eritrea ===
==== Ecoregions of Eritrea ====
List of ecoregions in Eritrea

==== Administrative divisions of Eritrea ====
Administrative divisions of Eritrea

- Regions of Eritrea
    - Districts of Eritrea

===== Regions of Eritrea =====
Regions of Eritrea

===== Districts of Eritrea =====
Districts of Eritrea

===== Municipalities of Eritrea =====
- Capital of Eritrea: Asmara
- Cities of Eritrea

=== Demography of Eritrea ===
Demographics of Eritrea

== Government and politics of Eritrea ==
Politics of Eritrea

- Form of government: presidential republic
- Capital of Eritrea: Asmara
- Elections in Eritrea
- Political parties in Eritrea

=== Branches of the government of Eritrea ===
Government of Eritrea

==== Executive branch of the government of Eritrea ====
- Head of state: President of Eritrea, Isaias Afwerki
- Head of government: President of Eritrea, Isaias Afwerki

==== Legislative branch of the government of Eritrea ====
- Parliament of Eritrea (bicameral)
  - Upper house: Senate of Eritrea
  - Lower house: House of Commons of Eritrea

==== Judicial branch of the government of Eritrea ====
Court system of Eritrea

=== Foreign relations of Eritrea ===
Foreign relations of Eritrea

- Diplomatic missions in Eritrea
- Diplomatic missions of Eritrea

==== International organization membership ====
The State of Eritrea is a member of:

- African, Caribbean, and Pacific Group of States (ACP)
- African Development Bank Group (AfDB)
- African Union (AU)
- Common Market for Eastern and Southern Africa (COMESA)
- Food and Agriculture Organization (FAO)
- Group of 77 (G77)
- International Atomic Energy Agency (IAEA)
- International Bank for Reconstruction and Development (IBRD)
- International Civil Aviation Organization (ICAO)
- International Criminal Court (ICCt) (signatory)
- International Criminal Police Organization (Interpol)
- International Development Association (IDA)
- International Federation of Red Cross and Red Crescent Societies (IFRCS) (observer)
- International Finance Corporation (IFC)
- International Fund for Agricultural Development (IFAD)
- International Labour Organization (ILO)
- International Maritime Organization (IMO)
- International Monetary Fund (IMF)
- International Olympic Committee (IOC)
- International Organization for Standardization (ISO) (correspondent)
- International Telecommunication Union (ITU)
- International Trade Union Confederation (ITUC)
- League of Arab States (LAS) (observer)
- Multilateral Investment Guarantee Agency (MIGA)
- Nonaligned Movement (NAM)
- Organisation for the Prohibition of Chemical Weapons (OPCW)
- Permanent Court of Arbitration (PCA)
- United Nations (UN)
- United Nations Conference on Trade and Development (UNCTAD)
- United Nations Educational, Scientific, and Cultural Organization (UNESCO)
- United Nations Industrial Development Organization (UNIDO)
- Universal Postal Union (UPU)
- World Customs Organization (WCO)
- World Federation of Trade Unions (WFTU)
- World Health Organization (WHO)
- World Intellectual Property Organization (WIPO)
- World Meteorological Organization (WMO)
- World Tourism Organization (UNWTO)

=== Law and order in Eritrea ===
Law of Eritrea

- Constitution of Eritrea
- Human rights in Eritrea
  - LGBT rights in Eritrea
  - Freedom of religion in Eritrea
- Law enforcement in Eritrea

=== Military of Eritrea ===
Military of Eritrea

- Command
  - Commander-in-chief
- Forces
  - Army of Eritrea
  - Navy of Eritrea
  - Air Force of Eritrea

=== Local government in Eritrea ===
Local government in Eritrea

== History of Eritrea ==
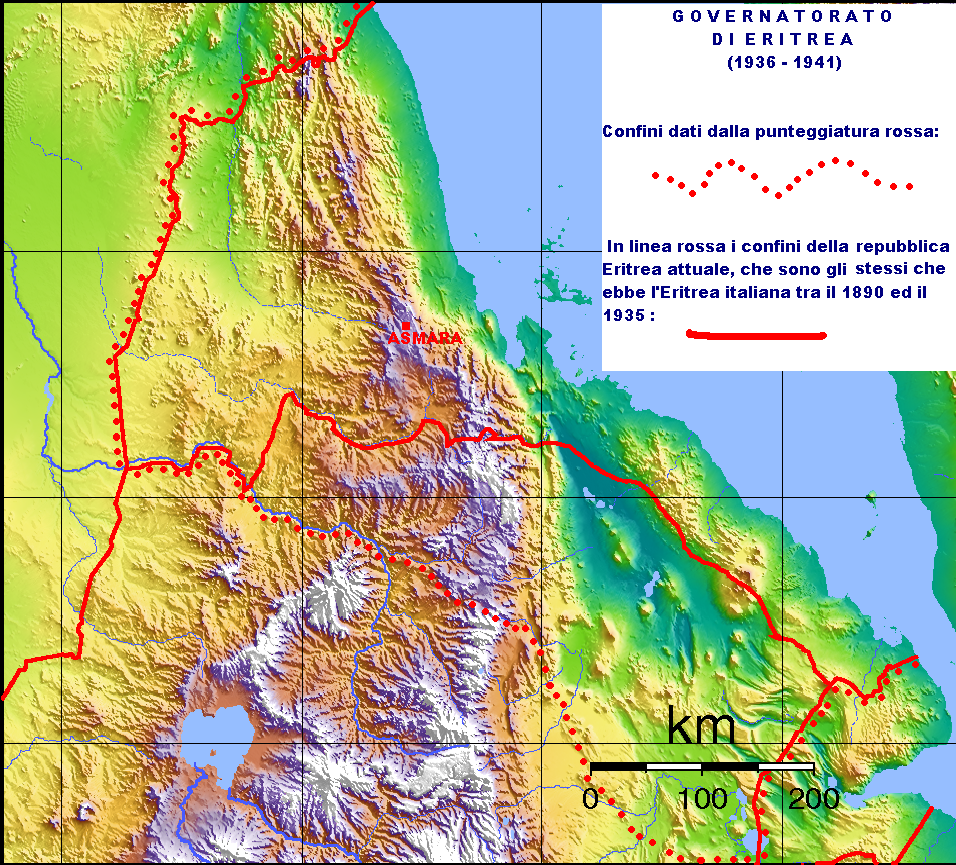
"Governorato di Eritrea" (1936–1941). Borders with red points

History of Eritrea

- Current events of Eritrea
- Italian Eritrea
- Eritrea Governorate

== Culture of Eritrea ==
Culture of Eritrea

- Cuisine of Eritrea
  - Italian eritrean cuisine
- Languages of Eritrea
- Media in Eritrea
- Museums in Eritrea
- National symbols of Eritrea
  - Coat of arms of Eritrea
  - Flag of Eritrea
  - National anthem of Eritrea
- People of Eritrea
- Prostitution in Eritrea
- Public holidays in Eritrea
- Religion in Eritrea
  - Christianity in Eritrea
  - Catholicism in Eritrea
  - Hinduism in Eritrea
  - Islam in Eritrea
  - Judaism in Eritrea
  - Sikhism in Eritrea
- World Heritage Sites in Eritrea: None

=== Art in Eritrea ===
- Literature of Eritrea
- Music of Eritrea

=== Sports in Eritrea ===
Sports in Eritrea

- Football in Eritrea
- Eritrea at the Olympics
- Tour of Eritrea

== Economy and infrastructure of Eritrea ==
Economy of Eritrea

- Economic rank, by nominal GDP (2007): 161st (one hundred and sixty first)
- Agriculture in Eritrea
- Banking in Eritrea
  - National Bank of Eritrea
- Communications in Eritrea
  - Internet in Eritrea
- Companies of Eritrea
- Currency of Eritrea: Nakfa
  - ISO 4217: ERN
- Energy in Eritrea
- Mining in Eritrea
- Tourism in Eritrea
- Transport in Eritrea
- Health care in Eritrea
- Transportation in Eritrea
  - Airports in Eritrea
  - Rail transport in Eritrea

== Education in Eritrea ==
- Education in Eritrea

== Health in Eritrea ==
- Health in Eritrea
- COVID-19 pandemic in Eritrea
- COVID-19 vaccination in Eritrea

== See also ==
- Eritrea
- List of Eritrea-related topics
- List of international rankings
- Member state of the United Nations
- Outline of Africa
- Outline of geography
