= List of ambassadors of Eritrea to Germany =

Coordinates: 52.556634°N 13.410615°E

Ambassador of Eritrea to Germany
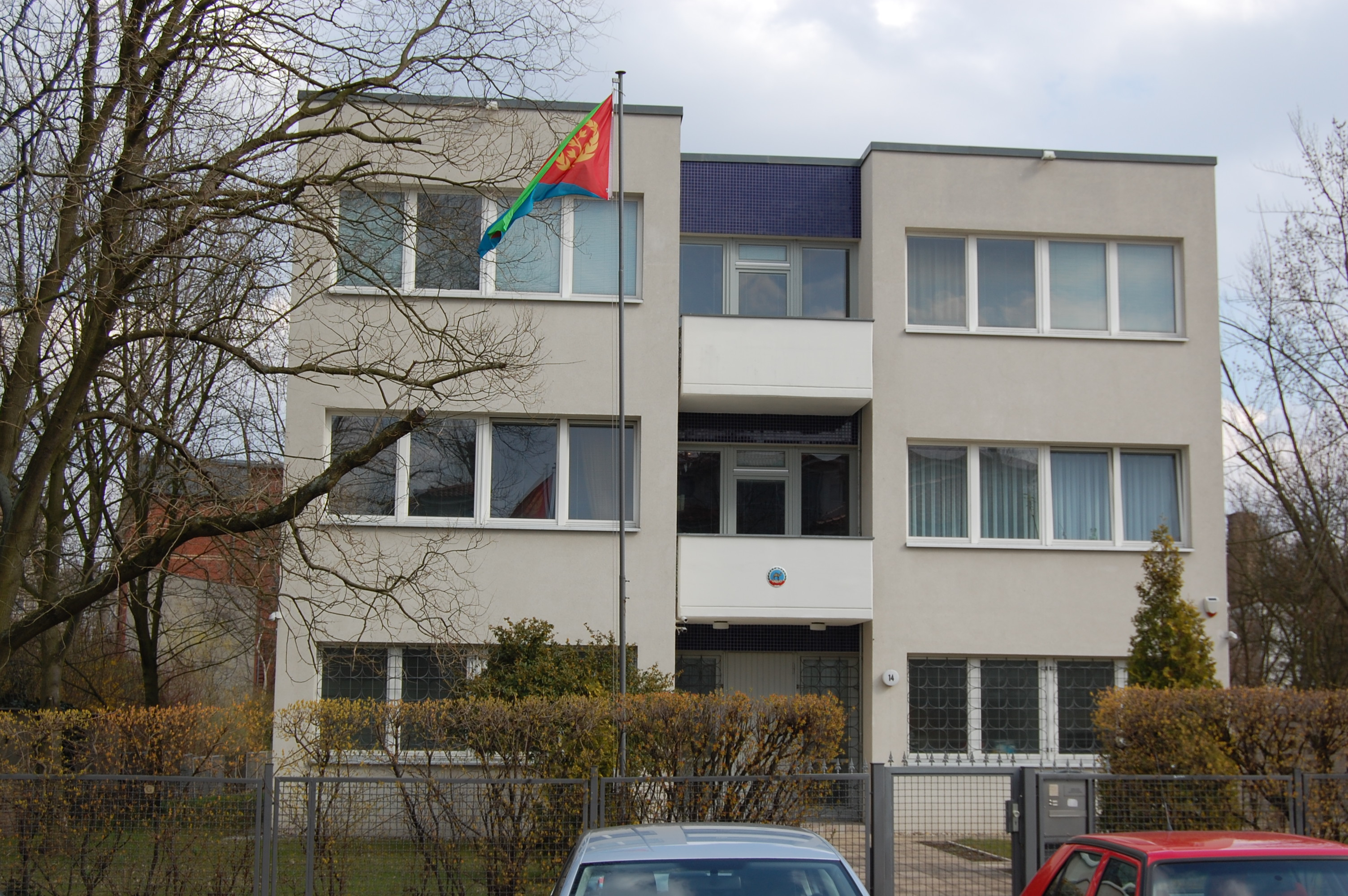
- Incumbent; Yohannes Woldu Habtemikael since 2014
- Inaugural holder: Goitom Woldemariam
- Formation: September 14, 1992

The Eritrean ambassador in Berlin is the official representative of the Government in Asmara to the Government of the Germany.

== List of representatives ==
Diplomatic agrément/Diplomatic accreditation	Ambassador	Observations	List of heads of state of Eritrea	List of chancellors of Germany	Term end
September 14, 1992	Goitom Woldemariam	Wolde-Mariam Goytom: March 9, 1992 Vienna; 2002 he was head of Eritrea's department of income tax.	Isaias Afwerki	Helmut Kohl	
October 15, 1997	Woldemichael Abraha		Isaias Afwerki	Helmut Kohl	
1999	Petros Tseggai	Chargé d'affaires	Isaias Afwerki	Gerhard Schröder	2000
2000	Beraki Ghebreselassie		Isaias Afwerki	Gerhard Schröder	2001
2001	Zemede Tekle Woldetatios		Isaias Afwerki	Gerhard Schröder	2004
March 2005	Petros Tseggai Asghedom	(*August 7, 1946 in Asmara): 1974 Degree in Chemical Engineering (Polytechnic Institute of Odessa; 2001 awarded specializations in Human Rights; 2004 awarded Economic Cooperation at the Free University S. Pio V of Rome.; 1974-1980 President of the Association of Eritreans in Europe.; 1980-1983: Secretary of the National Union of Eritrean Workers.; 1983-1993: representative of the Commission of Chemists.; 1993: Head of the Sub - Committee on the Referendum (for residents in Germany and Austria).; 1994-2000First Secretary Embassy in Germany.; 1997: member of the Constituent Assembly.; 1997: member of the National Assembly.; 2000-2004: Embassy Counsellor in Italy.; Nov 19, 2014 ambassador in Moscow.	Isaias Afwerki	Angela Merkel	
2014	Yohannes Woldu Habtemikael	Chargé d'affaires	Isaias Afwerki	Angela Merkel	
