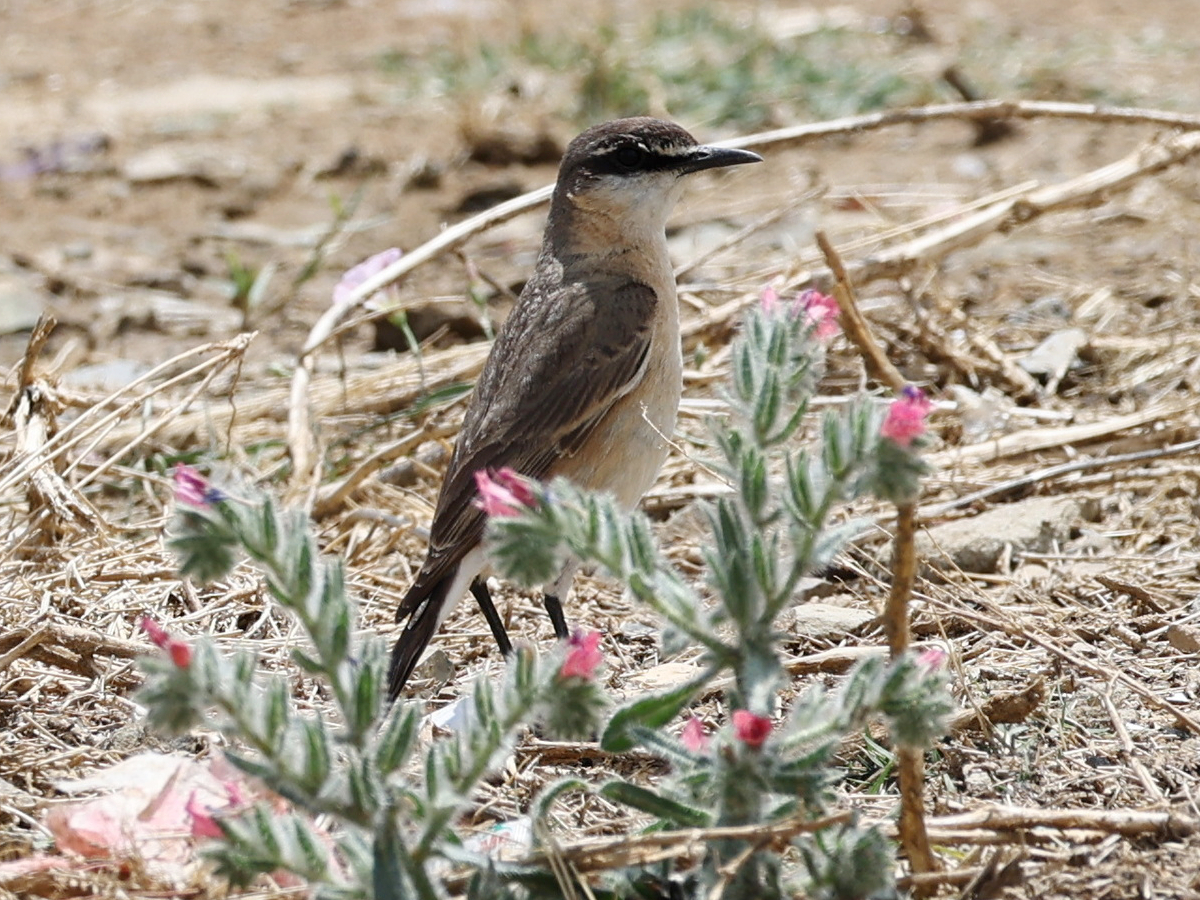
- Buff-breasted wheatear in the Asir Mountains, Saudi Arabia

Conservation status
- Least Concern (IUCN 3.1)

Scientific classification
- Kingdom: Animalia
- Phylum: Chordata
- Class: Aves
- Order: Passeriformes
- Family: Muscicapidae
- Genus: Oenanthe
- Species: O. bottae

Binomial name
- Oenanthe bottae (Bonaparte, 1854)

= Buff-breasted wheatear =

Species of bird

The buff-breasted wheatear (Oenanthe bottae), also known as Botta's wheatear or the red-breasted wheatear, is a species of bird in the Old World flycatcher family Muscicapidae. It is endemic to the Asir Mountains. The species is named after Paul-Émile Botta.

Heuglin's wheatear (O. heuglini) and the rusty-breasted wheatear (Oenanthe frenata) were formerly considered to be conspecific.

== Description ==
Resembles the larger and darker northern wheatear, but with a duller reddish breast and broader black tail tip. The sexes are alike.

== Range and habitat ==
It is native to the Asir Mountains of western Saudi Arabia and Yemen. Its natural habitat is subtropical or tropical high-altitude grassland. It is most common at altitudes over 1800 m.
