= Law enforcement in Eritrea =

The law enforcement in Eritrea is carried out by the National Police and Security Forces, commanded by Brigadier General Simon Ghebredengel, and by the Eritrean Police Force, commanded by Colonel Beraki Mehary Tsegai.

There is also the INTERPOL National Central Bureau in Asmara, who is headed by Abraham Debesai. According to INTERPOL, major security issues are human trafficking, terrorism and maritime piracy.

== See also ==
- Eritrean Police Force
