= LGBTQ rights in Eritrea =

- Eritrea
- Legal status: Illegal
- Penalty: Up to 7 years imprisonment
- Gender identity: No
- Military: No
- Discrimination protections: No

Family rights
- Recognition of relationships: No recognition of same-sex unions
- Adoption: No

Lesbian, gay, bisexual, transgender, and queer (LGBTQ) people in Eritrea face severe challenges not experienced by non-LGBTQ residents. Homosexual acts are illegal in Eritrea and are typically punishable by up to seven years in prison. LGBTQ persons are reportedly prosecuted by the government and additionally face hostility amongst the broader population. The government also restricts freedom of expression and encourages the censorship of LGBTQ issues.

== Law regarding same-sex sexual activity ==
Both male and female expressions of same-sex sexual activity are illegal in Eritrea. Same-sex sexual activity is prohibited in Section II (Sexual Deviations) of the penal code of 1957, inherited from Ethiopia after independence and itself a British colonial legacy. In practice, little is known about the use of this law, since the state-controlled Eritrean press does not report on the prosecution of homosexuality at all. The British Embassy in Asmara reported that people found to participate in homosexual activity are regularly prosecuted and found guilty. The government routinely detains individuals for consensual homosexual activity and has allegedly periodically engaged in roundups of known or suspected lesbians and gays in the country. In many cases, no charges are laid and the families of accused homosexuals are denied information on their condition or where they are being held. The Eritrean judicial system is opaque and often arbitrary in dealing with accusations of homosexual activity. The abuse, torture, and beating of prisoners is commonplace, and some have reported that prisoners are illegally executed. Despite this, the United Kingdom Foreign and Commonwealth Office reported that the death penalty was not used in Eritrea in 2013. In 2003, six gay men were arrested in a public bathroom in Asmara and subsequently transferred to the Adi Abeyto prison facility, known for its housing of political prisoners and journalists. Even those with only tenuous links to the gay and lesbian community within Eritrea are at risk of suspicion of same-sex conduct and consequently arrest and imprisonment.

The Government of Eritrea has rejected an appeal by the United Nations Human Rights Council's Universal Periodic Review process to legalize same-sex sexual activity. This was deemed to be "in direct contradiction with the values and traditions of the Eritrean people". Additionally, there are no major efforts to change or rescind existing laws.

== Censorship ==
According to a 2023 US State Department report: Eritrea has no public LGBTQ organizations and the government tightly restricts freedom of expression including on subjects related to sexual orientation or gender identity/expression. LGBTQI+ individuals are not allowed to freely assemble, associate, or express themselves publicly due to fear of identification, arrest, and discrimination or violence. The censorship is state sponsored but is furthered by the heavy social stigma around LGBTQ people that often leads to abuse and harassment.

== Recognition of same-sex relationships ==
Same-sex couples have no legal recognition.

== Adoption and family planning ==
Same-sex couples cannot adopt in Eritrea.

== Discrimination protections ==
There is no protection against discrimination based on sexual orientation and gender identity.

== Living conditions ==
The UN High Commissioner for Refugees stated that "strong societal taboos" existed against homosexual conduct within Eritrea. Similarly, the U.S. Department of State reported that gays and lesbians faced "severe societal discrimination". In general, these issues are not discussed openly in the country and homosexuality is not considered a public issue. There is limited public awareness of the existence of sexual and gender minorities except among the law enforcement agencies charged with combatting homosexuality. No LGBTQ groups or organizations are known to exist within the country. Society discrimination is exacerbated by the illegality of homosexuality, leading to increased incidence of abuse and harassment of gays and lesbians. Freedom House similarly found that criminalization of homosexual activity had resulted in both societal and legal discrimination. The Government of Eritrea has numerous times asserted that homosexuality is contrary to traditional values and norms within the country. Additionally, in the early 2000s it aired a number of radio and television programs on state-run stations detailing the alleged dangers of homosexuality.

Gays and lesbians serving in the Eritrean military are reported to have been "subjected to severe abuse", though such reports have remained unconfirmed. A 2002 refugee claimant in the United Kingdom reported that he and his partner, both in the armed forces, suffered physical and verbal abuse, including threats, from both superiors and fellow soldiers.

Societal discrimination against people with HIV/AIDS is an "area of concern" in the State Department report on human rights in Eritrea. ILGA and some HIV/AIDS prevention groups have condemned the criminalization of homosexual activity by Article 600, arguing that it undermines public health goals by making prevention programs directed at men who have sex with men extremely difficult.

The government of Eritrea has repeatedly charged Western countries with promoting homosexuality within the country in order to destabilize the regime. Opponents or suspected opponents of the regime were labeled as "gay, traitors, rapists, pedophiles, and traffickers" in attempts to suppress and delegitimize criticism of the government.

In 2010, along with a number of other African states, Eritrea rejected the Yogyakarta Principles, which attempt to apply developed human rights standards to issues of sexual orientation and sexual identity. These standards were deemed by the African group to be too controversial and were accused of inventing new human rights without a basis in international laws.

== Conversion therapy ==
No laws in Eritrea ban conversion therapy. There have been reports of LGBTQ people being offered to go to conversion therapy in lieu of jail time (same-sex sexual activity is criminalised in Eritrea). The LGBTQ charity, OutRight Action International found that conversion therapy and attempts to forcibly "change" somebody's sexual orientation or gender identity were widespread due to social stigma.

== LGBTQ foreigners ==
In 2013, Paolo Mannina, a gay Italian citizen, was dismissed from his job as a literature professor at a technical school in Asmara and deported from Eritrea. Mannina agreed to leave, reportedly fearing for his safety. No official explanation was given for his removal from the country, but the government of Eritrea stated that Mannina was a "dangerous individual who is potentially destabilizing to the moral order and public of the country". Under subsequent questioning from Italian officials, the Eritrean government clarified that, despite the lack of mention of sexual orientation in the contracts of Italian schools operating in the country, the expulsion was justified based on Article 7 of the Agreement on Italian Technical Schools in Eritrea. The Agreement requires compliance with local laws, and the government argued that this included Article 600 of the Eritrean Penal Code. The Eritrean ambassador to Italy commented that "any foreigner present in Eritrea has the obligation to respect the local customs and traditions and, even more so, the provisions of law prohibiting homosexual relations". Italian diplomatic officials condemned the action.

In 2004, three hotel workers from Western countries were expelled from Eritrea for homosexual activity. At least one of the deported workers was described as openly homosexual.

== Summary table ==
Same-sex sexual activity legal	No
Equal age of consent	No
Anti-discrimination laws in employment only	No
Anti-discrimination laws in the provision of goods and services	No
Anti-discrimination laws in all other areas (incl. indirect discrimination, hate speech)	No
Same-sex marriage	No
Recognition of same-sex couples	No
Step-child adoption by same-sex couples	No
Joint adoption by same-sex couples	No
Gays and lesbians allowed to serve openly in the military	No
Right to change legal gender	No
Access to IVF for lesbians	No
Commercial surrogacy for gay male couples	No
MSMs allowed to donate blood	No

== See also ==
- Human rights in Eritrea
- LGBTQ rights in Africa
