= Eritrean Police Force =

Law enforcement agency in Eritrea

The Eritrean Police Force (EPF) is the main law enforcement agency of Eritrea; the organization is part of the Eritrean Police and Security Command which has its headquarters in the capital Asmara. The EPF mission is to enforce and uphold the law, to prevent, detect and investigate crime and to control traffic. The force is described as being both bureaucratized and militarized, being dependent on military forces in dealing with emergency situations.
The Eritrean Police Force pre-existed the independent State of Eritrea, being the local police department within the larger Ethiopia. In order to consolidate its position, the Eritrean liberation movement penetrated the police and security apparatus in Eritrea and recruited followers and members from the Eritrean Police Force. In 1994 the Eritrean Police Force was established using personnel demobilized from the Eritrean Liberation People's Front. As of 2002, the E.P.F. lacked specialist branches.
As of 2014, the Commander of the Eritrean Police Force is Colonel Mehary Tsegai.

== Diplomatic police ==
According to the U.S. Embassy in Eritrea, Eritrea has a diplomatic police unit, responsible for police protection at diplomatic missions in Asmara and for investigation of crimes involving diplomatic properties and personnel.

== Military police ==
According to the U.S. Embassy in Eritrea, a military police force also exists. Military police are responsible for responding to protests, riots, or other civil disturbances.

== Training ==
Training consists in a 2-3 months-long training for those with prior military experience, while it is 5-months long for civilians.
