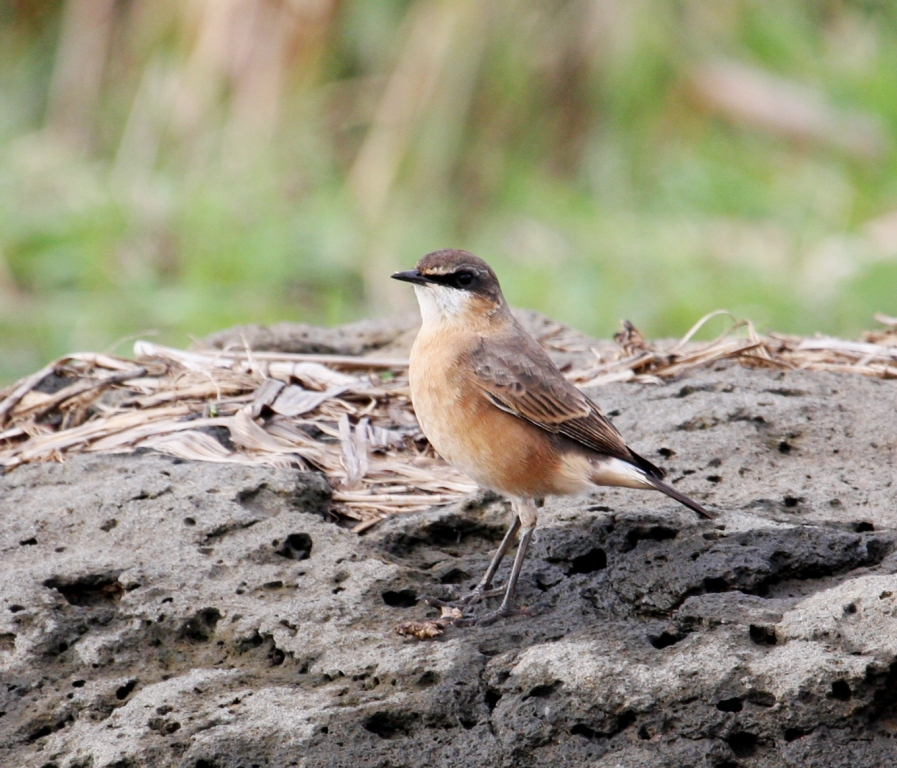
- In Ethiopia

Conservation status
- Least Concern (IUCN 3.1)

Scientific classification
- Kingdom: Animalia
- Phylum: Chordata
- Class: Aves
- Order: Passeriformes
- Family: Muscicapidae
- Genus: Oenanthe
- Species: O. frenata

Binomial name
- Oenanthe frenata (Heuglin, 1869)

= Rusty-breasted wheatear =

Species of bird

The rusty-breasted wheatear (Oenanthe frenata) is a species of bird in the Old World flycatcher family Muscicapidae that is native to the Ethiopian Highlands.

The rusty-breasted wheatear was formerly considered to be a subspecies of the red-breasted wheatear(Oenanthe bottae) which is now renamed the buff-breasted wheatear.
