= Prostitution in Eritrea =

Prostitution in Eritrea is legal and regulated. Official figures state there are around 2,000 prostitutes in the country, who are not allowed to operate near schools, hospitals, and churches. According to the 2009 Human Rights Reports, security forces occasionally follow women engaged in prostitution and arrest those who had spent the night with a foreigner. Some women enter prostitution due to poverty. Prostitutes are known locally as "shermuta" in Arabic, or "mnzerma" and "me'amn" in Tigrinya.

== History ==
There had been courtesans and concubines in the Habesha culture for centuries.

After the colonization by Italy in 1880 there was an increase in forced prostitution by Italian soldiers, the Italian population was estimated at 8000 military and civilian people, with the advent of fascism during the Second Italo-Ethiopian War in 1935 the increased prostitution for requests for sexual labor from Italian military authorities with an increase in sexual abuse and rape of women and children with the increase in pedophile. Prostitution was encouraged with the advent of Italian racial laws by the authorities and discouraged mixed marriages (in many cases forced marriages) between Italians and locals. Brothels were opened and local women were recruited, if necessary forcibly with coercion, to work in them. These brothels were subsidized by the authorities. Women also came from rural areas of Eritrea forcibly emigrated the vast majority were girls aged 12 and over. In major cities like Assab, Asmara and Massawa, prostitution was common in bars in the "native neighborhoods". [5] This phenomenon continued much less during the World War II with the war lost in 41 it could no longer be resorted to by force of arms.

Following the federation with Ethiopia in 1950, the Ethiopian troops stationed in Eritrea, and the American troops at Kagnew Station continued the demand for prostitution. Prostitution increased during the 1970s with the build-up of the Ethiopian garrisons in the area. In the 1980s there were a hundred prostitutes between Assab, Asmara and Massawa. Many worked in bars owned by successful prostitutes.

During the Eritrean War of Independence, Eritrean girls in occupied territories we required to sign up to join the army at 16. There is evidence many were used as prostitutes by the soldiers. At time of liberation by the Eritrean People's Liberation Front and independence, there were 4,000 prostitutes in the country, and 2,000 Ethiopian women were deported in an attempt to curtail prostitution. With the spread of HIV in the 1990s, prostitution was regulated and sex workers were required to have a monthly health check.

Prostitution increased in Asmara following arrival of the United Nations Mission in Ethiopia and Eritrea peacekeeping force in 2000.

== Forms of prostitution ==
- Street walkers: These prostitutes work mainly at night seeking clients on the street.
- Home based prostitutes: These prostitutes receive clients in their homes.
- Bar owners: These practice prostitution as an additional source of income in the bars they own.
- Bar ladies: They seek clients in the bars they work in. They may or may not be paid by the bar owners.
- Small drinking house prostitutes: They work in local drinking houses or tearooms and use prostitution to supplement their income.
- Brothels: There are a number of brothels, which are usually also drinking houses.
- Call girls: In recent time, with the emergence of cell phones, call girls now operate in the country.

== HIV ==
HIV is a problem in the country, although it has one of the lowest prevalence rates in Sub-Saharan Africa. In the 1990s prostitution was regulated and monthly health checks carried out to try to stop the spread of infections. 25 clinics and hospitals gave free testing for prostitutes. Social workers used community elders to try to spread the message of safe sex and condom use to prostitutes and clients.

Campaigns have targeted high risk groups, including sex workers. As a result, the HIV prevalence amongst sex workers has fallen from 22% in 2002, to 10.4% in 2014. Condom use by sex workers had risen to 95% in 2014.

== Child prostitution ==
Child prostitution is a problem in the country. The law criminalises child prostitution. The minimum age for consensual sex is 18. Penalties for conviction of the commercial sexual exploitation of children include imprisonment. Crimes were seldom reported, and punishment rarely applied. Data on the extent of child prostitution is not available.

UN peacekeeping forces have been involved in the use of under-age prostitutes, some as young as 10. Danish, Italian, Slovakian and Irish soldiers have been implicated.

== Sex trafficking ==
Eritrean adults and children are subjected to sex trafficking abroad, primarily in Sudan, Ethiopia, and Libya. Some women and girls are subjected to sex trafficking within the country. Some Eritrean women and girls travel to Gulf States for domestic work but are subsequently subjected to sex trafficking. Smaller numbers of Eritrean women and girls are subjected to sex trafficking in South Sudan, Sudan, and Israel; reportedly, some Eritrean men are vulnerable to sex trafficking in Israel. Some Eritrean military and police officers are complicit in trafficking crimes along the border with Sudan.

The United States Department of State Office to Monitor and Combat Trafficking in Persons ranks Eritrea as a Tier 3 country.

== See also ==
- Prostitution in Africa
