= Legal system of Eritrea =

The legal systems of Eritrea go as far back as the 14th century. Before independence, Eritrea was colonized by Italy and later occupied by Britain, therefore subjugated to those nations' laws through the World War II era. In the 1950s, the United Nations gave neighboring Ethiopia power and responsibility for Eritrea, and thus its legal system mirrored that of Ethiopia. After gaining its independence in 1993, Eritrea began to draft its own constitution. The new constitution was ratified in 1997, but has never been implemented. Much of Eritrea's judicial system is spelled out in this Constitution. However, even today, customary law has remained the most prevalent law in the lives of most Eritreans.

== History ==
Customary laws within Eritrea can be traced back to the 14th century. These laws were written with the intention of enforcing cultural norms.

There are five main periods of legal history in Eritrea:

1. The civil law period based on Italian colonial rule
2. The common law system employed during British occupation
3. The years of federation and annexation
4. The implementation of Ethiopian law over Eritrea
5. The post-independence era

However, local customary law was always recognized and respected, even as the official written laws changed.

=== Colonial period ===
From 1890 to 1947, Eritrea was under Italian control. During the occupation, the Italian Penal Code was officially law in Eritrea. However, Italy allowed local customary law to be practiced by Eritreans, while Italians living in Eritrea were expected to adhere to the Italian codes.

The British defeated and expelled the Italians in 1941, though Eritrea was recognized as an Italian colony until 1950. The British military administration implemented new laws, especially for criminal law and evidentiary procedures. The administration did not repeal the Italian Penal Code, which in effect disenfranchised Eritrea in any criminal proceedings. Customary law was still used to govern all other matters including civil law.

Under the Federation of Ethiopia and Eritrea (1952-1962), the National Assembly created a commission to codify customary law. However, because of extreme tension and fighting between the groups attempting to draft the new code, the project was scrapped, and the commission remains inactive today.

=== Independence ===
By 1958, the movement for Eritrean independence gave rise to the Eritrean Liberation Front, which turned to armed struggle in 1961. The ensuing Eritrean War of Independence would last until 1991, when a coup toppled the Ethiopian regime. The new administration could no longer maintain power over Eritrea, leaving a vacuum of legislation and judicial proceedings that were needed to monitor life in Eritrea. This began the redrafting of the legal system in its entirety within Eritrea. Legal scholars began working on a new constitution, as well as new penal, civil, labor, commercial, criminal codes and civil and criminal procedures under Proclamation No. 1/1991. Much of the legislation adapted Ethiopian legislation to Eritrean culture and needs. This included an expansion of women's rights, limits on the time prisoners could be held in detention, and a presumption of innocence for those charged with crimes. Moreover, private law mirrored international legislation. This culminated in the expansion of the justice system. With the number of courts growing from 38 to 110 and reaching rural populations, and a subsequent emphasis not only on customary law but civil law, Eritrea transitioned from a country mainly governed by local legal practices to a unified legal system.

In 1994, the transitional government established the Constitutional Commission. This included a group of 50 experts from a variety of religious and ethnic backgrounds appointed by the National Assembly to create the next constitution. Headed by Bereket Habte Selassie, the assembly aimed to create a fair, just Constitution. The Constitution spelled out democratic ideals, delineated separation of powers and guaranteed human rights for all.

Since 1997, major codes within Eritrean legislation were proposed and discussed amongst experts. For a variety of reasons, including the inability to translate these laws into vernacular languages, they have not been put in place to this day. There are, however, about 150 proclamations and legal notices that have gone into effect across the country. These are only available for viewing in the Ministry of Justice Library.

=== Constitutional basis of judiciary ===
==== 1952 Constitution ====
Although Eritrea was under Ethiopian control in 1952, a federal act in Ethiopia established an Eritrean constitution. This Constitution not only gave deference to local customary law systems, but also created a legal pluralism structure by empowering the judicial systems that were in place, as well as mandating that judges be familiar with local cultural customs and legal practices. Moreover, the 1952 Constitution's inclusion of the "Special Rights of the Various Population Groups in Eritrea" article enables protections for minorities including those surrounding land ownership, languages, local administration, and political participation.

The government states that customary law before 1952 was changed by this civil law declaration, which enabled the maintenance of traditional, cultural values. However, the mandatory requirement for officials to learn local customs and legalize what was previously customary law along with other expectations was removed in the 1997 Constitution.

==== 1997 Constitution ====
The structure and power of the Eritrean judiciary is laid out in Articles 48-54 of the 1997 Constitution.

Article 48 of Act I establishes judiciary power within the court system. This article explicitly says legal authority is vested in the Supreme Court and lower courts, which will be created as needed by law. Similar to the U.S. Constitution, the article says courts must adhere to the Constitution and subsequent laws in following the desires of the Eritrean people.

The article also details specific protections and guidelines for judges. First, it frees judges from answering to any other authority. Judges' sole focus should be the Constitution and the cases presented to them, and their sole guidance should be the judicial code of conduct and the law. Second, Article 48 safeguards judges from being sued over actions they took in their positions as judges. Finally, the article mandates that other state institutions cooperate with and support the judicial system in any way asked of them.

Article 49 highlights the Supreme Court and its processes. This article establishes the Supreme Court as the court of last resort and the Chief Justice in control of said court. The Supreme Court oversees its own internal operations, including forms of decision-making and the process of case selection. However, the number of justices and terms of the justices within the Supreme Court will be determined by law. In terms of jurisdiction, the Supreme Court controls all impeachment charges against the Presidency and can hear appeals from lower courts.

Article 50 expands on the operation of the lower courts. Similar to the Supreme Court, lower court justices and their terms are determined legislatively. Unlike the Supreme Court, lower courts’ internal organization is also covered by the law.

Article 51 highlights the oath taken by every Eritrean judge. The oath reads as follows: "I, _____________, swear in _____________ that I will adjudicate in accordance with the provisions of the Constitution and laws enacted thereunder and I will exercise the judicial authority vested in me, subject only to the law and my conscience".

Article 52 discusses the process to remove judges from office. It states that the sole person able to remove judges before the end of their term is the president. The Judicial Service Commission is responsible for investigating judges, making certain that they are mentally and physically capable, and that they adhere to the judicial code of conduct. In the case that a judge is found unable to fulfill these requirements, the Judicial Service Commission is obligated to recommend removal to the president. Based on the commission's evaluation, the president then decides whether to remove the judge.

Article 53 delves more into the Judicial Service Commission. The commission submits recommendations for individuals well-suited for judicial positions. Other responsibilities, influence, and institutional management of the commission will be decided by law.

Article 54 establishes the position of the Advocate General, whose obligations will be determined by subsequent law.

Unlike the 1952 Constitution Eritrea shared with Ethiopia, Eritrea's 1997 Constitution does not protect customary law and instead replaces it with a centralized legal system. Also, the 1997 Constitution does not include any sections specifically discussing minority rights, and thus undoes the 1952 prior acknowledgment of different minority groups within Eritrea.

=== Courts ===
Eritrea has two judicial systems. Within the Regular Court system, consisting of the High Court and Zonal Courts, the legislation and codes created by Eritrean leaders are enforced. However, the second judicial system, called the Special Court, is generally composed of community courts, sharia courts, and military courts. The Special Court is not guided by legal legislation that governs the country. Instead, this system places its standards on those who participate. Moreover, although there is supposed to be some separation of branches, in practice the judiciary system is highly entangled with the executive branch. The Special Court is generally operated by the military or executive personnel. Moreover, the budget of the judicial system comes from the executive branch, and in practice, this power has created a lack of public confidence within the decisions of the court system. Instead, people bring their issues to the executive branch.

==== Regular Court System ====
Composed of Zonal and High Courts, the Regular Court System is both a court of the first instance and an appellate court. With civil cases, jurisdiction is split between Zonal and High Courts depending on the disputed amount. Using a measure of movable or unmovable property, cases are divided up in a small claim/large claims format. For criminal cases, the severity of the crime determines the jurisdiction of the court.

===== High Court =====
The High Court is the appellate court for zonal decisions. Moreover, in certain instances, the High Court does have original jurisdiction. Although the creation of a Supreme Court is within the Constitution, in practice, this has not occurred. Thus the highest appellate court within this system acts like a Court of Last Resort, which is the High Court. This specific court entertains appeals from within the grouping of high courts. In terms of civil cases, the High Court acts as a large claims court by governing over cases with values greater than 250,000 Nakfa in movable property and 500,000 Nakfa in immovable property. Moreover, other civil cases such as "bankruptcy, negotiable instruments, insurance, intellectual property rights, habeas corpus, nationality, filiation, expropriation, and communal exploitation of property" fall under the purview of the High Court. Concerning criminal cases, those with serious injuries under Article 538 of the Transitional Penal Code are under the jurisdiction of the High Court, including most cases of murder, rape, and other felonies. Cases that do not meet this bar go to the lower courts, including Zonal and Community court.

===== Zonal courts =====
Zonal courts, also known as regional courts, are the second-lowest structure within the judicial system, right above community court. Within civil cases, the zonal court is responsible for cases regarding assets worth 50,000 to 250,000 Nakfa for movable assets and 100,000 to 500,000 Nakfa for immovable. The zonal courts are generally used for this type of civil case, however, cases such as divorce or other minor claims not already in the purview of the high court fall under the zonal court's jurisdiction. In terms of criminal cases, the zonal court deals with instances of a minor injury. Moreover, any appeals to community court fall under the jurisdiction of zonal courts.

==== Special Court system ====
===== Special Court =====
The Special Court varies from all other court systems present within the Eritrean judicial system. By Article 7 of the Special Court Proclamation, the key connection this court has is not to other court systems, but to the Ministry of Defense. Because it is not under the Ministry of Justice, it is essentially controlled by the executive branch. The officials operating within this system are generally senior military officers without any legal experience or knowledge. Moreover, the budget for this court is delegated directly from the President. Due to these parameters, the permissions of this court also vary from those of a typical court. It is the option of the court whether the Transitional Penal Code will be put into play, which includes the rights one has in going to court. Combined with an executive order, rights to an attorney, fair trial, etc., have been annulled in this system. In fact, attorneys are not known to practice in the Special Court.The point of the Special Court is to deter corruption by convicting crimes of theft, embezzlement, and corruption. The limits of what this entails, however, is not clearly defined. Moreover, the Special Court system has special jurisdiction. It can retry cases that have already been decided by the Regular Courts as stated in Article 4(2) in the Special Court Proclamation. Judges can ask the defendant to state their case, but there is no defense counsel or right of appeal. Many of the decisions are made based on "conscience".Moreover, the Special Court is known to issue orders to the other courts regarding administrative duties.

===== Sharia court =====
Sharia courts have jurisdiction over family, inheritance, and marriage matters within Islamic families and communities. They determine the verdict by applying Islamic law principles. This was originally established under Italian colonization as part of a political decision to maintain certain power structures.

===== Military court =====
Within the military court, there is limited personal jurisdiction. These courts govern the Eritrean Defense Force, police, the National Reserve Army, prison wardens and the National Service, including people who are active in those groups and former combatants who may have carried out government actions.

===== Community Court =====
Community court is referred to as a court by name but more closely resembles a legal arbitration process in many other nations. Magistrates preside over this court and are elected by community members to two-year terms. In this court, judges hope to mitigate issues and come to a resolution based on local customs. This is the lowest structural level within the judicial system, but remains the most recent and accessible court system to the average Eritrean. Legal positions within these courts do not require legal training and are regulated by the risk of not being reelected. Moreover, the Ministry of Justice is creating a capacity development program for community court judges to increase their literacy and ability to lead this system through basic legal training. In fact in a little over a year, more than 30,000 cases were presented to community courts. According to a government website, about 58% were resolved through reconciliation, 33.5% were resolved through a judgment, 8.5% were being processed and 2.9% had been appealed.

=== Judiciary studies and the legal profession ===
==== Legal education ====
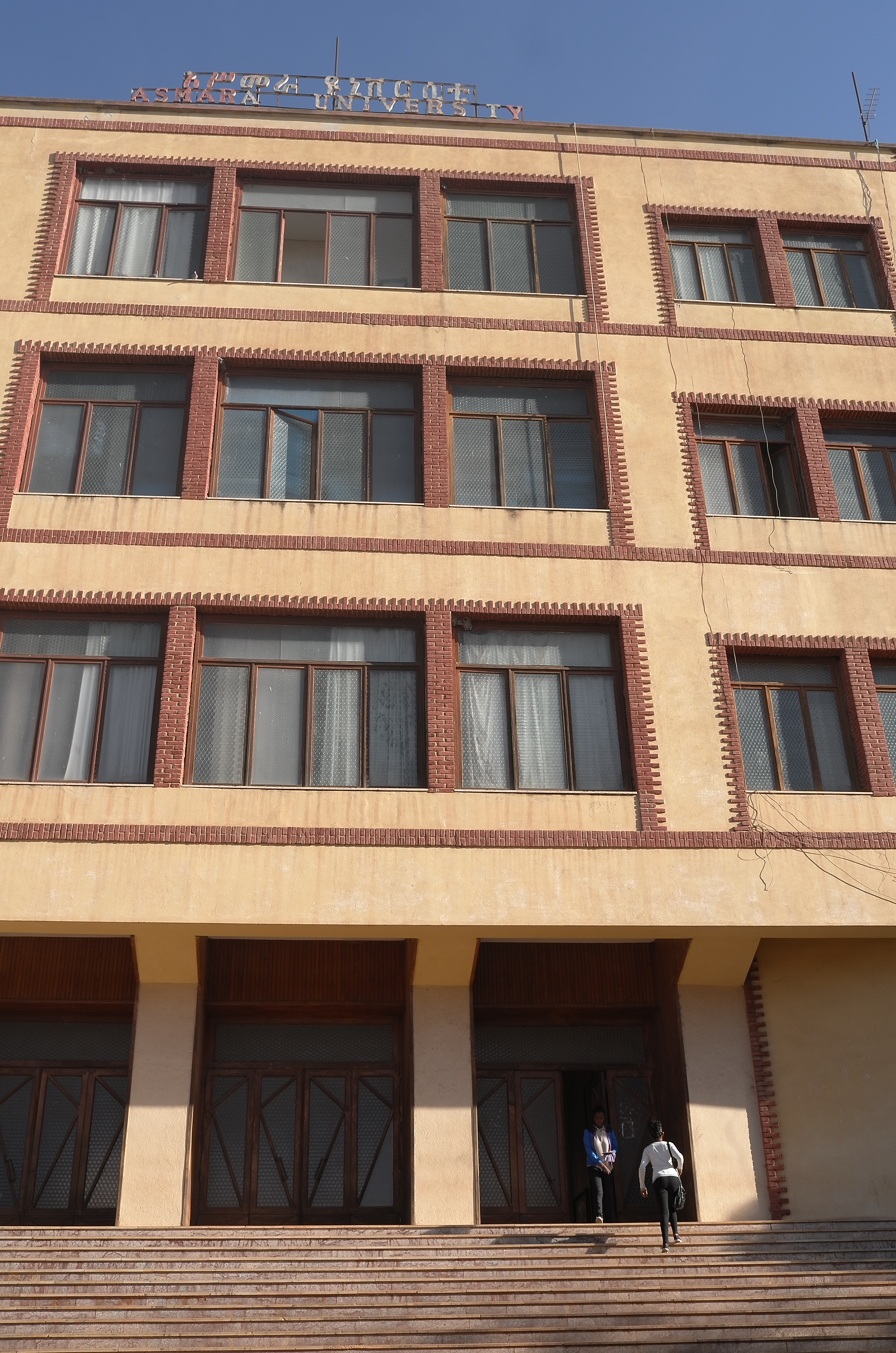
University of Asmara

In 1994, when Eritrea was first formed as an independent nation, much of its new judicial and legal systems were patterned on the legal systems of Ethiopia, the U.S., or international law. While a team of experts from the National Assembly, the Ministry of Justice, and foreign advisers worked to hammer out a constitution and body of laws, the new nation continued to follow an adjusted version of the Ethiopian legal system. By 1996, students at the University of Asmara's law school were still being taught using Ethiopian, American and European legal structures.

The professors themselves had frequently been educated in Ethiopian institutions. As the Ministry of Justice worked to put out more legal text, courses in Eritrean law schools often relied on Ethiopian treaties or comparative studies as their main texts. At the time, there were no textbooks specifically on Eritrean law. The University of Asmara also struggled with a lack of research facilities and found it difficult to retain permanent faculty.

In time, the Constitution of 1997 would be taught as a fundamental legal document. Also becoming vital reference works were proclamations by the Ministry of Justice on laws regarding various subjects such as freedom of the press, banking, taxation, financial-sector regulation, communications, mining, business, provisional codes, and the regulation of the legal field.

In 2003, in an attempt to give its law school more autonomy, the University of Asmara promoted its Law Department to the Faculty of Law. At the time, the law program had 166 law candidates and had graduated 155 alumni. Still, the country continued to suffer from a shortage of qualified lawyers, with just 1 lawyer for every 1,745 citizens. In 2007, the University of Asmara demoted its law school again to be part of the College of Arts and Social Science.

==== Eritrean Bar Association ====
The Eritrean Bar Association is not strict about who can or cannot be a lawyer. Although the University of Asmara continues to teach law and counts a variety of judges, prosecutors, and government legal advisers as alumni, there is no prohibition on either the creation of an independent bar association nor are requirements impossible to circumvent. The Legal Committee of the Ministry of Justice is in charge of empowering or regulating the legal industry, and thus can make exceptions for conditions needed to practice law.

=== Court's effectiveness ===
Article 43 of the 1997 Constitution grants the president immunity from all civil and criminal cases during their time in office. It states that cases brought against the president in civil court will instead fall under the responsibility of the State, and it is Eritrea as a country that will be sued. Also, once out of office, the president is no longer legally liable in civil courts for acts performed during their presidency. In a criminal proceeding, cases against the president are nullified in any cases outside of impeachment.

Also, the existence of a secondary, executive-run judicial system within the Special Court system enables judiciary control by the executive office. The lack of guaranteed rights and ability to reopen any case creates a paradox of order within the judiciary while stripping it of authenticity.

Moreover, although the Constitution guarantees a variety of rights within the judicial system, in practice, things tend to be different. The right to a fair, public, prompt trial is not guaranteed. Defendants in criminal proceedings do not have the right of protection from self-incrimination and generally only have an attorney if they can provide one themselves. Also, there is no civil court proceeding for human rights violations, and criminal courts are especially influenced by the executive branch. The government has held politicians, journalists, religious leaders, and persons evading conscription for an unknown amount of time without trial or formal legal charges, and has not allowed any outside access to them.

The existence of community courts and regulations via local customs and rules enables relaxation and accessibility to the court that was not previously available. Community courts enable participants to speak in their language, fully explain their situation, and resolve disputes among themselves. Moreover, with the election of women judges, there is hope that they will slowly change the traditional roles of women in Eritrea.
