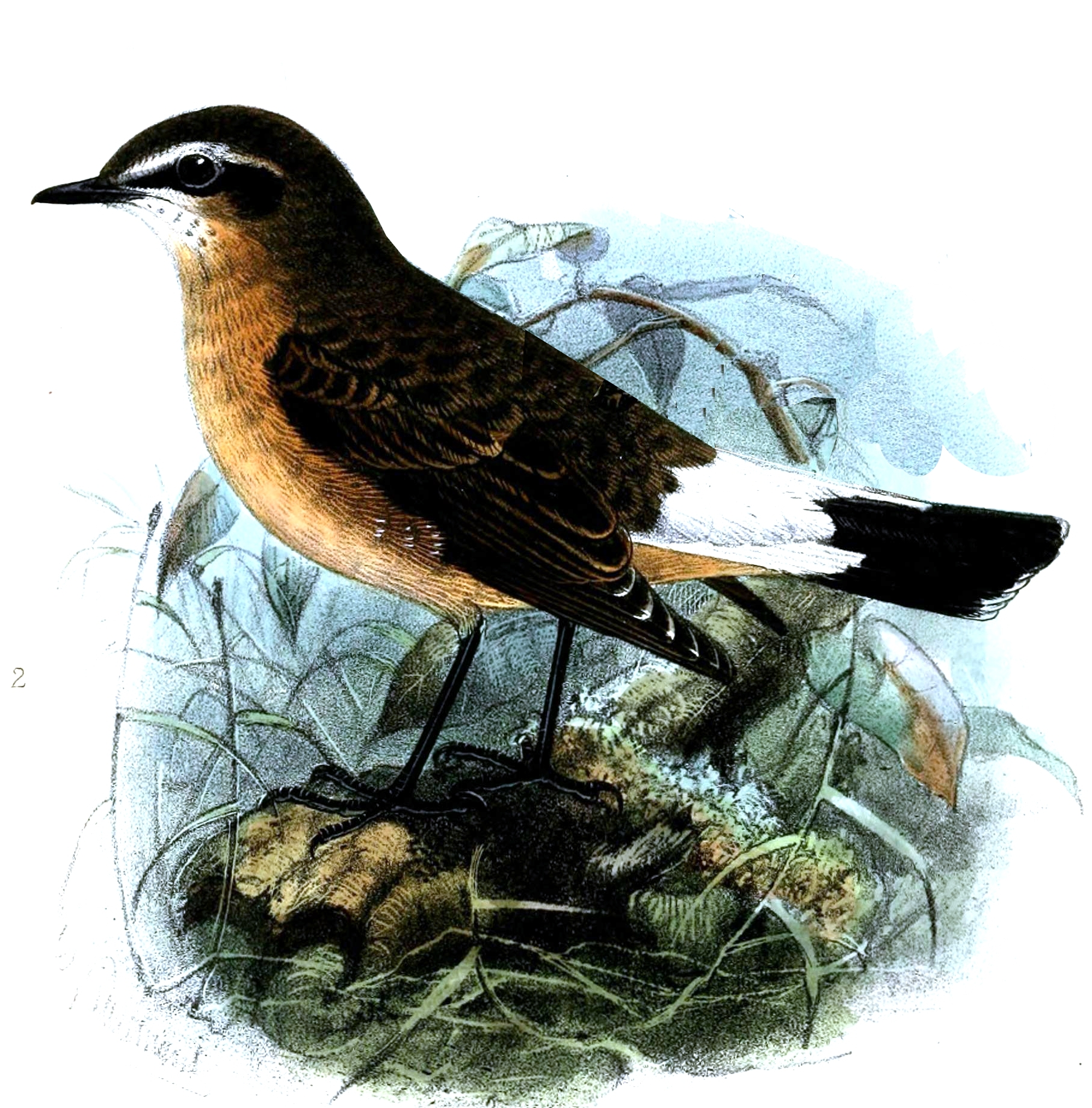
- Illustration by John Gerrard Keulemans
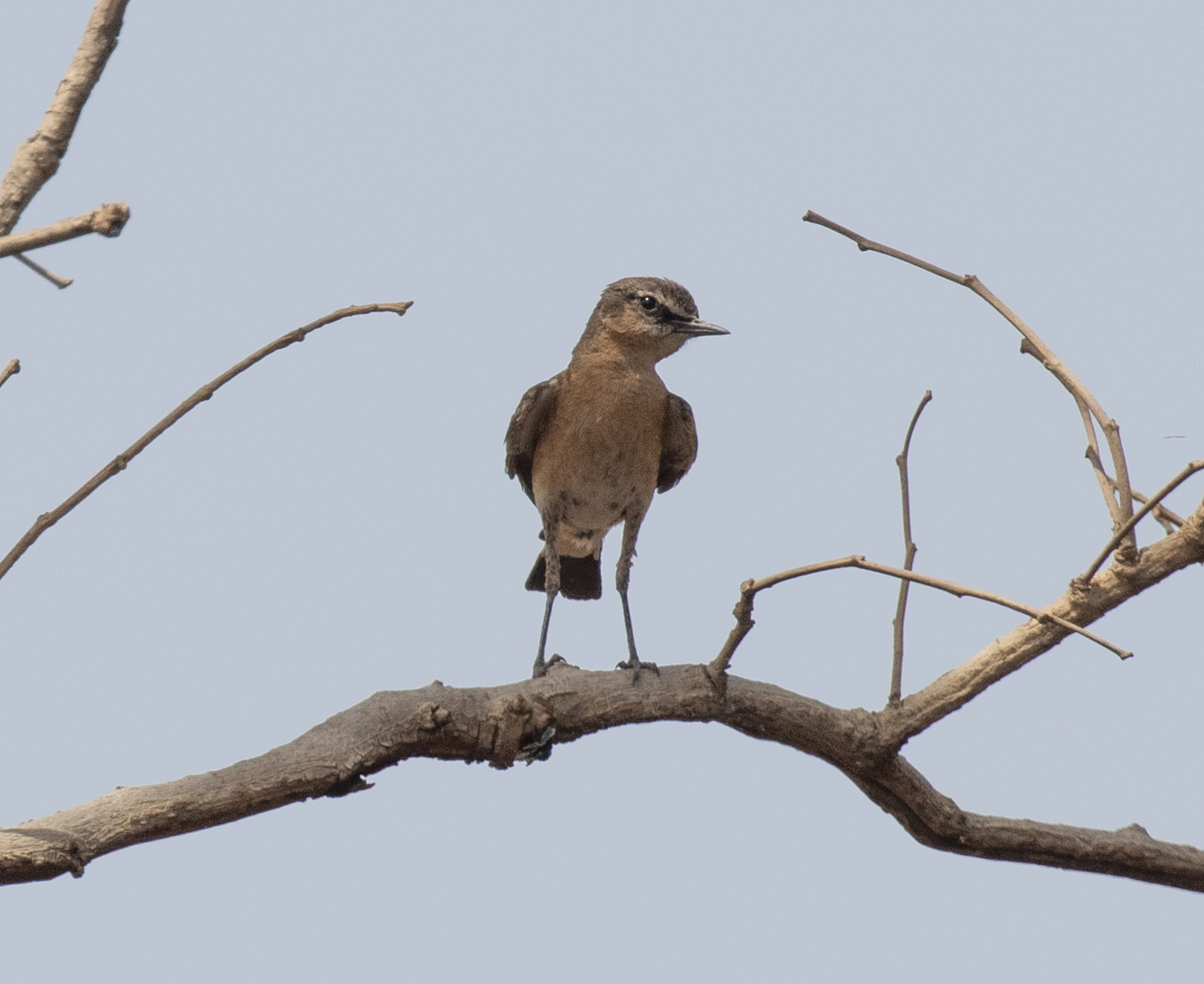

Conservation status
- Least Concern (IUCN 3.1)

Scientific classification
- Kingdom: Animalia
- Phylum: Chordata
- Class: Aves
- Order: Passeriformes
- Family: Muscicapidae
- Genus: Oenanthe
- Species: O. heuglinii

Binomial name
- Oenanthe heuglinii (Heuglin, 1869)

Synonyms
- Oenanthe bottae heuglini

= Heuglin's wheatear =

Species of bird

Heuglin's wheatear (Oenanthe heuglinii) is a small passerine bird in the wheatear genus Oenanthe.

== Description ==
It is 13-14 centimetres long. The adult has dark grey-brown upperparts, a black mask and a white stripe above the eye. The breast is orange-buff shading into the paler throat and belly. The tail is black apart from white sides to the basal half. The uppertail-coverts and undertail-coverts are white and the underwing-coverts are buff-pink.

=== Voice ===
The song is long, complex and includes imitations and the call is a harsh chack.

== Distribution and habitat ==
Heuglin's wheatear inhabits the Sahel region from Mauritania eastwards through Mali, Niger, Chad and Sudan to Eritrea. It extends south as far as northern parts of Ghana, Togo, Benin, Nigeria, Cameroon, the Central African Republic, Uganda and north-west Kenya. It is found in open country with rocks and short grass and is often seen on burnt ground. Some birds are resident but others make migratory movements.

== Habits ==
Heuglin's wheatear feeds mainly on insects. It wags its tail and spreads its tail when displaying. Rather shy and in the breeding season usually seen in pairs, small groups recorded in winter.

== Taxonomy and naming ==
It was formerly classified as a subspecies of red-breasted wheatear (O. bottae) of the Ethiopian Highlands and Arabia but is now usually regarded as a separate species due to differences in size, habitat and behaviour. Its name honours the German explorer and ornithologist Theodor von Heuglin.
