= List of ecoregions in Eritrea =

The following is a list of ecoregions in Eritrea, as identified by the Worldwide Fund for Nature (WWF).

== Terrestrial ecoregions ==
by major habitat type

=== Tropical and subtropical grasslands, savannas, and shrublands ===
- East Sudanian savanna
- Sahelian Acacia savanna

=== Montane grasslands and shrublands ===
- Ethiopian montane grasslands and woodlands

=== Deserts and xeric shrublands ===
- Eritrean coastal desert
- Ethiopian xeric grasslands and shrublands
