= Woldemichael Abraha =

Eritream politician

1st Minister of Local Government of Eritrea
- In office 2014–Present
- Preceded by: Andemichael Kahsai

Personal details
- Party: PFDJ

Woldemichael Abraha was the fourth Minister of Transport and Communications for Eritrea starting in 2004. He was appointed Minister of Local Government after Woldemichael Gebremariam died in 2013. According to the Eritrean government convention, Abraha – as minister of Local Government – serves as head of state when the President is away.

== Political career ==
Abraha began his political activities in 1961 as a member of the Eritrean Liberation Movement. He joined the Eritrean People's Liberation Front in 1974 and later served as chairman of the National Union of Eritrean Workers from 1979 to 1987. Following Eritrea's independence, he held several government positions, including head of the Ports and Marine Transport Authority, governor of the Central Region, ambassador to Germany, and governor of the Southern Red Sea Region.

== Death ==
Abraha died in Asmara on 24 May 2025, aged 87, following an illness. His funeral was held at Asmara Martyrs Cemetery on 28 May 2025 and was attended by President Isaias Afwerki and senior Eritrean government officials.
