= Environmental issues in Eritrea =

Eritrea faces a wide variety of issues. Environmental issues include continued deforestation, desertification, soil erosion, overgrazing, and significant land loss as a result of the presence of hundreds of thousands of land mines. Additionally, there is heavy mining within the country for gold, copper, and zinc. For years, mining was the only major source of revenue for the country and so this was encouraged by the national government.

Significant strides towards sustainability and environmental recovery had originally been made by the Government of Eritrea. Although, the Eritrean Government had embarked on a program to reforest Eritrea (which in 1900 was 30% forested land, despite heavy logging) and prevent wood from being used as a fuel source, plans have been hampered in recent years because of a mass exodus of working Eritreans from the country.

The government of Eritrea, with the assistance of the UN Development Program had enacted a Coastal Marine and Island Biodiversity Conservation Project which was designed to protect the entire coastal zone of Eritrea. This is the first project of its kind in scope and magnitude in the world. This program is meant to create a sustainable environment for coming generations. In recent years, the project has been hampered by the Eritrean government's continual encouragement of mining within the country which has affected the environmental stability of both highland and coastal regions.
