= Special Court of Eritrea =

The Special Court of Eritrea is a parallel court to the traditional judicial hierarchy. The Special Court may retry a case that has been resolved through the traditional legal system. The judges of the Special Court serve as the prosecutors of case while defense counsel is not allowed the defendant is allowed to present their case.

Special Court issues directives to other courts regarding administrative matters, although their domain was supposed to be restricted to criminal cases involving capital offenses, theft, embezzlement, and corruption. The Office of the Attorney General decides which cases are to be tried by a special court.
