= 2026 in Eritrea =

- Decades: 2000s; 2010s; 2020s
- See also: Other events of 2026; Timeline of Eritrean history

Events in the year 2026 in Eritrea.

== Incumbents ==
Photo	Post	Name
	President	Isaias Afewerki
	President of National Assembly	Isaias Afewerki

== Events ==
- 27 January – Eritrean human trafficker Amanuel Walid (also known as Tewelde Goitom) is sentenced to 20 years in prison in the Netherlands for torturing African migrants in Libya, and for running a trafficking network to Europe.
- 3 February – The Ethiopian government formally acknowledges the involvement of Eritrean military forces in the Tigray war and accuses them of mass killings in Tigray Region during the conflict.
- 6–22 February – Eritrea at the 2026 Winter Olympics
- 25 March – After defeating Eswatini 2-0 in the first leg of the preliminary round, the Eritrea national football team returns to Africa Cup of Nations qualification after an 18-year absence.
- 23 June – The Government of National Stability in eastern Libya bans the entry of nationals from Sudan, Eritrea, Ethiopia, and Somalia, citing a reorganization of foreign nationals' entry procedures.
- 19 September – Sanctions against President Isaias' People's Front for Democracy and Justice and Eritrean forces are lifted by the Trump administration "to advance US regional interests" in the Red Sea.
- 1 October – Eritrea severs diplomatic relations with Ethiopia amid fighting in Tigray.

== Holidays ==
- 1 January: New Year's Day
- 7 January: Orthodox Christmas Day
- 19 January: Orthodox Epiphany
- 10 February: Fenkil Day
- 8 March: International Women's Day
- 20 March: Eid al-Fitr
- 13 April: Orthodox Easter Monday
- 1 May: Labour Day
- 24 May: Independence Day
- 27 May: Eid al-Adha
- 20 June: Martyrs' Day
- 26 August: Milad un Nabi
- 1 September: Revolution Day
- 25 December: Christmas Day

== Deaths ==
- 22 July – Semere Russom, 82, ambassador to the United States (1997–2001)
