= 2025 in Eritrea =

- Decades: 2000s; 2010s; 2020s
- See also: Other events of 2025; Timeline of Eritrean history

Events in the year 2025 in Eritrea.

== Incumbents ==
Photo	Post	Name
	President	Isaias Afewerki
	President of National Assembly	Isaias Afewerki

== Events ==
- 27 March – German authorities arrest 17 people from the Brigade Nhamedu.
- 4 June – US President Donald Trump issues a proclamation barring Eritrean nationals from entering the United States.
- 12 December – Eritrea withdraws from the Intergovernmental Authority on Development, accusing member-states of acting against the country's interests.
- 24 December – Kidane Zekarias Habtemariam, an Eritrean national wanted internationally on suspicion of leading a criminal network targeting migrants to Europe with human trafficking and extortion, is extradited to the Netherlands.

== Holidays ==
- 1 January – New Year's Day
- 7 January – Orthodox Christmas
- 19 January – Epiphany
- 10 February – Fenkil Day
- 8 March – International Women's Day
- 30 March – Eid al-Fitr
- 18 April – Good Friday
- 20 April – Easter Sunday
- 1 May – May Day
- 24 May – Independence Day
- 6 June – Eid al-Adha
- 20 June – Martyrs' Day
- 1 September – Revolution Day
- 4 September – The Prophet's Birthday
- 25 December – Christmas Day

== See also ==
- Tigray War
- African Union
- Common Market for Eastern and Southern Africa
- Community of Sahel–Saharan States
