= 2022 in Eritrea =

- Decades: 2000s; 2010s; 2020s
- See also: Other events of 2022; Timeline of Eritrean history

Events in the year 2022 in Eritrea.

== Incumbents ==
Photo	Post	Name
	President	Isaias Afewerki
	President of National Assembly	Isaias Afewerki

== Events ==
- May 31 – The United Nations says that the Eritrean Defence Forces shelled the Ethiopian border town of Sheraro over the weekend, killing a 14-year-old girl and injuring 18 others.
- September 1 – The Tigray People's Liberation Front claims that Eritrea and Ethiopia have launched a joint offensive in the Tigray Region.

== Deaths ==
- February 9 – Abune Antonios, 94, Orthodox prelate.
- October 6 – Tekeste Baire, 69, trade union activist (NCEW).
- December 2 – Qerlos, 94, prelate, patriarch of the Eritrean Orthodox Tewahedo Church (since 2021).

== See also ==
- COVID-19 pandemic in Africa
- Tigray War
- African Union
- Common Market for Eastern and Southern Africa
- Community of Sahel–Saharan States
