= 2024 in Eritrea =

- Decades: 2000s; 2010s; 2020s
- See also: Other events of 2024; Timeline of Eritrean history

Events in the year 2024 in Eritrea.

== Incumbents ==
Photo	Post	Name
	President	Isaias Afewerki
	President of National Assembly	Isaias Afewerki

== Events ==
- 25 July – The Eritrean Civil Aviation Authority orders the banning of Ethiopian Airlines from operating over Eritrean airspace effective 30 September, citing multiple violations.
- 19 August – Former finance minister Berhane Abrehe dies after six years in solitary confinement in Carshelli prison in Asmara after being arrested for writing a book critical of President Isaias Afwerki.

== Holidays ==
- 1 January - New Year's Day
- 7 January - Orthodox Christmas
- 19 January - Epiphany
- 10 February - Fenkil Day
- 8 March - International Women's Day
- 29 March – Good Friday
- 31 March - Easter Sunday
- 10 April – Eid al-Fitr
- 1 May - May Day
- 24 May - Independence Day
- 16 June – Eid al-Adha
- 20 June - Martyrs' Day
- 1 September - Revolution Day
- 16 September – The Prophet's Birthday
- 25 December – Christmas Day

== See also ==
- Tigray War
- African Union
- Common Market for Eastern and Southern Africa
- Community of Sahel–Saharan States
