= 2020 in Eritrea =

- Decades: 2000s; 2010s; 2020s
- See also: Other events of 2020; Timeline of Eritrean history

Events in the year 2020 in Eritrea.

== Incumbents ==
- President: Isaias Afewerki

== Events ==
Ongoing – COVID-19 pandemic in Eritrea

- March 21 –The first case of COVID-19 in the country was confirmed in Asmara; the index case was an Eritrean national arriving from Norway.
- November 15 – Diplomats say that rockets fired from Tigray Region, Ethiopia, landed near the airport in Asmara.
- December 4 – Twenty-eight Jehovah's Witnesses are released after being imprisoned for five 26 years. Twenty-four other members of the sect remain in prison.

== Deaths ==
- May 13 – Afwerki Abraha, chemist, freedom fighter, diplomat; died of COVID-19 in the UK (b. 1949)
