= Girma Asmerom =

Eritrean politician (1949–2016)

Girma Asmerom Tesfai

Permanent Representative of Eritrea to the United Nations
- In office 23 April 2014 – 5 October 2016
- Preceded by: Araya Desta
- Succeeded by: Sophia Tesfamariam Yohannes

Eritrean Ambassador to the African Union
- In office ?–2014
- Succeeded by: Araya Desta

Personal details
- Born: 10 December 1949 British Military Administration in Eritrea
- Died: October 6, 2016 (aged 66) New York, New York, U.S.

Girma Asmerom Tesfai (10 December 1949 – 5 October 2016) was an Eritrean politician, diplomat and football player. He was the ambassador of Eritrea to the United Nations at the time of his death. He also previously served as ambassador to South Africa, the United States of America, the European Union (2006–2011) and African Union.

== Career ==
While Eritrea being part of Ethiopia he played professional football there for Dagnew FC and ELPA in the 1960s and was member of the Ethiopian national football team between 1968 and 1969. He participated at the 1968 Africa Cup of Nations with the host Ethiopia, where he placed third.

The diplomat was also once a college soccer star as an undergraduate student at Bowdoin College, in Brunswick, Maine. He got his BA degree in June, 1973 where he majored in Government studies. He also was an Honor student-athlete and made the Dean's List. He was also very active on campus and was a Student Proctor between 1971 and 1972. Outside of the class room he was the winner of the George Levine Memorial Soccer Trophy award and was Bowdoin's leading goal scorer of all time until 2007 when it was broken by another player who played all 4 years. Ambassador Girma accomplished the record in 3 years.

- After receiving a master's degree in the US, he went to the mountains of Nakfa, Eritrea in 1977 and joined the EPLF to fight for the independence of Eritrea.
- For the next 14 years, he contributed to the struggle for independence in various capacities – most notable of them all was establishing EPLF's Amharic radio program.
- On April 10, 2001, he was appointed Eritrean Ambassador to the United States, where he was accredited on June 20, 2001.

== Death ==
He died in New York City in the United States in 2016.
