= Asmerom =

Asmerom may refer to:

- Girma Asmerom (died 2016), Eritrean ambassador
- Yared Asmerom (born 1980), Eritrean distance-runner
- Bolota Asmerom (born 1978), long-distance runner who competed for Eritrea
