= 2017 in Eritrea =

- Decades: 1990s; 2000s; 2010s; 2020s
- See also: Other events of 2017; Timeline of Eritrean history

Events in the year 2017 in Eritrea.

== Incumbents ==
- President: Isaias Afewerki

== Events ==
- 1 November – In Asmara, 28 students are killed after police open fire on protestors during the Eritrean uprising.
