= 2014 in Eritrea =

- Decades: 1990s; 2000s; 2010s; 2020s
- See also: Other events of 2014; Timeline of Eritrean history

Events in the year 2014 in Eritrea.

== Incumbents ==
- President: Isaias Afewerki

== Events ==
- 16 – 28 August – The country competed at the 2014 Summer Youth Olympics, in Nanjing, China.
