= Eritrea–United States relations =

Bilateral relations

- Eritrea: United States

Eritrea–United States relations are bilateral relations between Eritrea and the United States.

== History ==
The U.S. government established a consulate in Asmara in 1942. In 1953, the USG signed a Mutual Defense Treaty with Ethiopia. The treaty granted the United States control and expansion of the important British military communications base at Kagnew near Asmara. In the 1960s, as many as 1,700 U.S. military personnel were stationed at Kagnew. In the 1970s, technological advances in the satellite and communications fields were making the communications station at Kagnew increasingly obsolete.

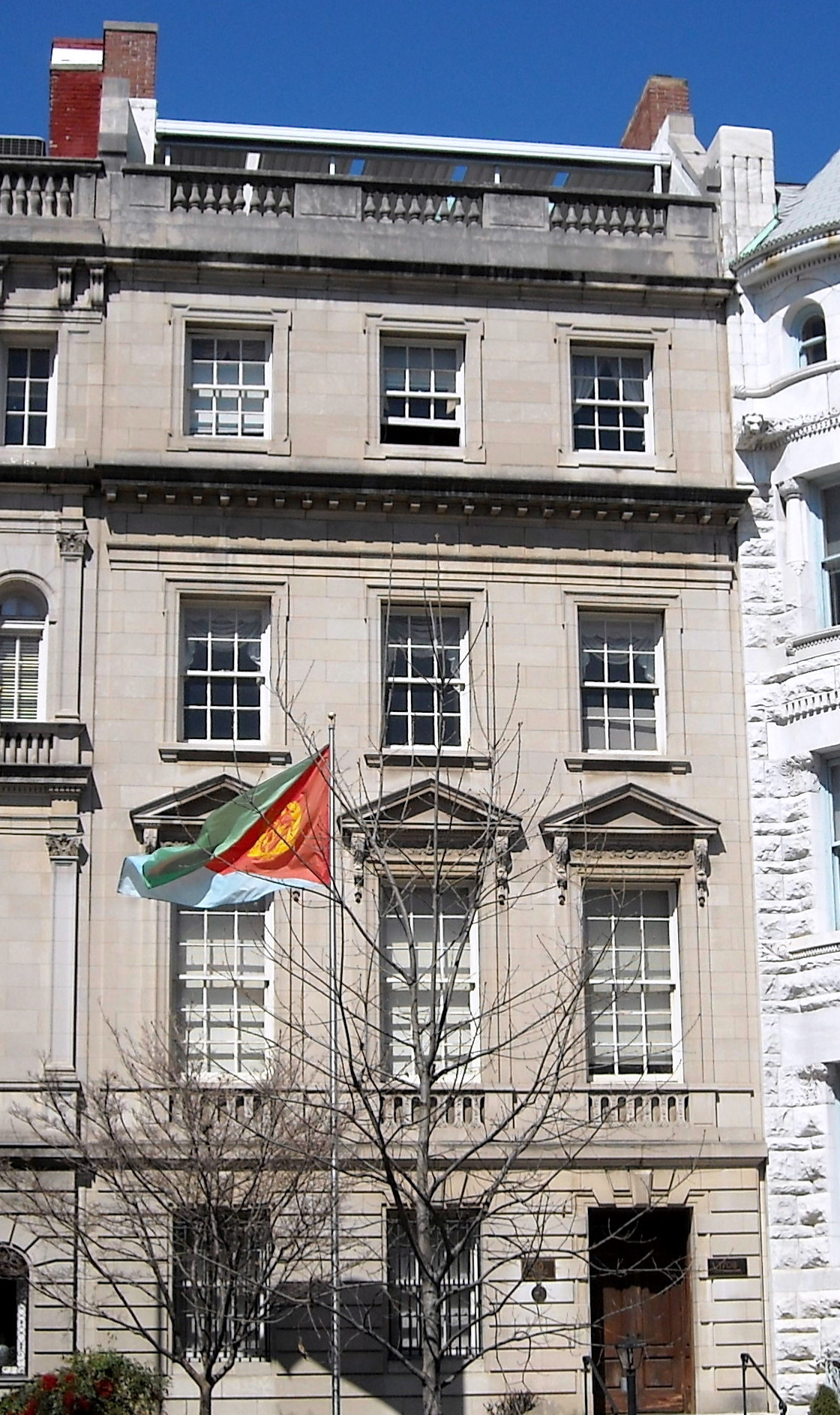
Embassy of Eritrea in Washington, D.C.

In 1974, Kagnew Station drastically reduced its personnel complement. In early 1977, the United States informed the Ethiopian government that it intended to close Kagnew Station permanently by September 30, 1977. In the meantime, U.S. relations with the Mengistu regime worsened. In April 1977, Mengistu abrogated the 1953 mutual defense treaty and ordered a reduction of U.S. personnel in Ethiopia, including the closure of Kagnew Communications Center and the consulate in Asmara. In August 1992, the United States reopened its consulate in Asmara, staffed with one officer.

The United States recognized the Republic of Eritrea on April 27, 1993, after the country's independence from Ethiopia in 1991. Full diplomatic relations between the United States and Eritrea were established on June 11, 1993, when Asmara was elevated to embassy status, with Joseph P. O'Neill acting as Chargé d'Affaires ad interim.

Relations between the two countries have been strained due to Eritrea's record on human rights and civil liberties, as well as its handling of political dissidents and the press. The Eritrean government's authoritarian regime, which is controlled entirely by the president and the sole political party, has yet to implement the constitution or conduct national elections since 1991.

In 2021, the United States imposed targeted sanctions against certain Eritrean entities and individuals, including the Eritrean Defence Forces, citing Eritrea continued involvement in the Tigray War. In a press statement Antony Blinken, the U.S. secretary of state, said "Eritrea’s destabilizing presence in Ethiopia is prolonging the conflict, posing a significant obstacle to a cessation of hostilities, and threatening the integrity of the Ethiopian state. Credible accounts implicate Eritrean forces in serious human rights abuses, and the United States remains gravely concerned about the conduct of all parties to the conflict".

Eritrea's relationship with the U.S. has been further complicated by President Joe Biden's statements at the United States–Africa Leaders Summit 2022. Biden emphasized the importance of Africa's success for global prosperity and acknowledged the existence of democracies in Africa, such as Botswana, Ghana, Kenya, Morocco, Namibia, Somaliland, and South Africa. However, he also indicated a willingness to overlook issues of corruption and human rights violations in certain contexts, although Eritrea was specifically mentioned as an exception due to its particularly troubling record. Eritrea's trajectory under President Isaias Afwerki's leadership has been marked by authoritarianism, severe restrictions on civil liberties, and involvement in regional conflicts, notably in Ethiopia and Tigray.

U.S. interests in Eritrea include consolidating the peace with Ethiopia, encouraging progress toward establishing a democratic political culture, supporting Eritrean efforts to become constructively involved in solving regional problems, and promoting economic reform.

In 2025, Marco Rubio, as per the U.S. Department of State, wished Eritrea a happy 34th independence anniversary and expressed a desire to pursue further diplomatic engagement with the country. Additionally, the second Trump administration listed de-escalating and preventing a regional conflict involving in the Horn of Africa (Eritrea-Somalia-Ethiopia) as one of its national security goals. According to the November 2025 National Security Strategy, "Opportunities for engagement could include negotiating settlements to ongoing conflicts (e.g., DRC-Rwanda, Sudan), and preventing new ones (e.g., Ethiopia-Eritrea-Somalia)" (p. 33, Section E: Africa).

As of 7 May 2026, The United States is planning to lift sanctions against Eritrea, reflecting a strategic shift linked to the Red Sea's rising geopolitical importance amid regional tensions and the Iran war. The move aims to improve U.S.-Eritrea relations and send a message to Ethiopia regarding its ambitions for sea access, given the regional instability caused by conflicts in Sudan, Somalia, and Ethiopia. The Wall Street Journal states, "The Trump administration is exploring ways to reset ties with a reclusive and autocratic state controlling prime geopolitical real estate along the Red Sea as Iran threatens to choke off a second vital maritime corridor against the backdrop of war with the U.S." This seeks to address the shifting dynamics in the Red Sea region, especially with the closure of the Strait of Hormuz disrupting oil supplies and increasing contestation over maritime routes.

During a keynote address marking Eritrea's 35th Independence Anniversary on 24 May 2026. Afwerki stated that criticism “should not be directed at President Trump alone,” adding that those who “claim to be ‘influential’ and strive to mislead and corner Trump must not be forgotten.” The remarks came amid heightened geopolitical competition in the Horn of Africa and the Red Sea region, where Eritrea has deepened coordination with Egypt and Somalia over regional security and maritime governance, while tensions persisted with Ethiopia over its pursuit of sea access. Despite detractors questioning the trajectory of rapprochement, both Eritrea and the United States continued signaling interest in recalibrating relations within the context of broader Red Sea security realignments.

In a May 2026 article for Foreign Affairs titled The War in Ethiopia Isn’t Over, Hilary Matfess argued that Ethiopia should pursue a diplomatic reset with Eritrea in order to reduce the risk of renewed regional conflict and proxy warfare. The article stated that tensions between Ethiopian Prime Minister Abiy Ahmed and the Eritrean government had escalated over security disputes, including Ethiopian calls for Red Sea access through the Eritrean port of Assab. Matfess wrote that the Ethiopian government “should also try to cool tensions with Egypt and Eritrea” and suggested that negotiations involving the United States could help normalize relations and prevent Eritrea from continuing to support armed proxy groups inside Ethiopia.

On 18 September 2026, the United States lifted sanctions imposed on Eritrean entities and individuals in connection with the Tigray War. The sanctions, originally imposed in November 2021 under Executive Order 14046, had targeted the Eritrean Defence Forces, the ruling People’s Front for Democracy and Justice, and other Eritrean individuals and entities. The measures were renewed annually under a presidential declaration of a national emergency. On 18 September 2026, the U.S. Treasury Department announced that the national emergency had expired, ending the sanctions regime established under the 2021 measure. The delisting included Eritrean individuals such as Hagos Ghebrehiwet and the Red Sea Trading Corporation, which was linked to the ruling party. The decision came amid increased U.S. attention to the strategic importance of the Red Sea and the Bab el-Mandeb Strait. The U.S. State Department said the United States sought to adapt its foreign policy to current regional circumstances and advance its regional interests. Eritrea welcomed the lifting of the sanctions, with Information Minister Yemane Gebremeskel describing the move as a remedial measure by the Trump administration.

== Diplomatic missions ==
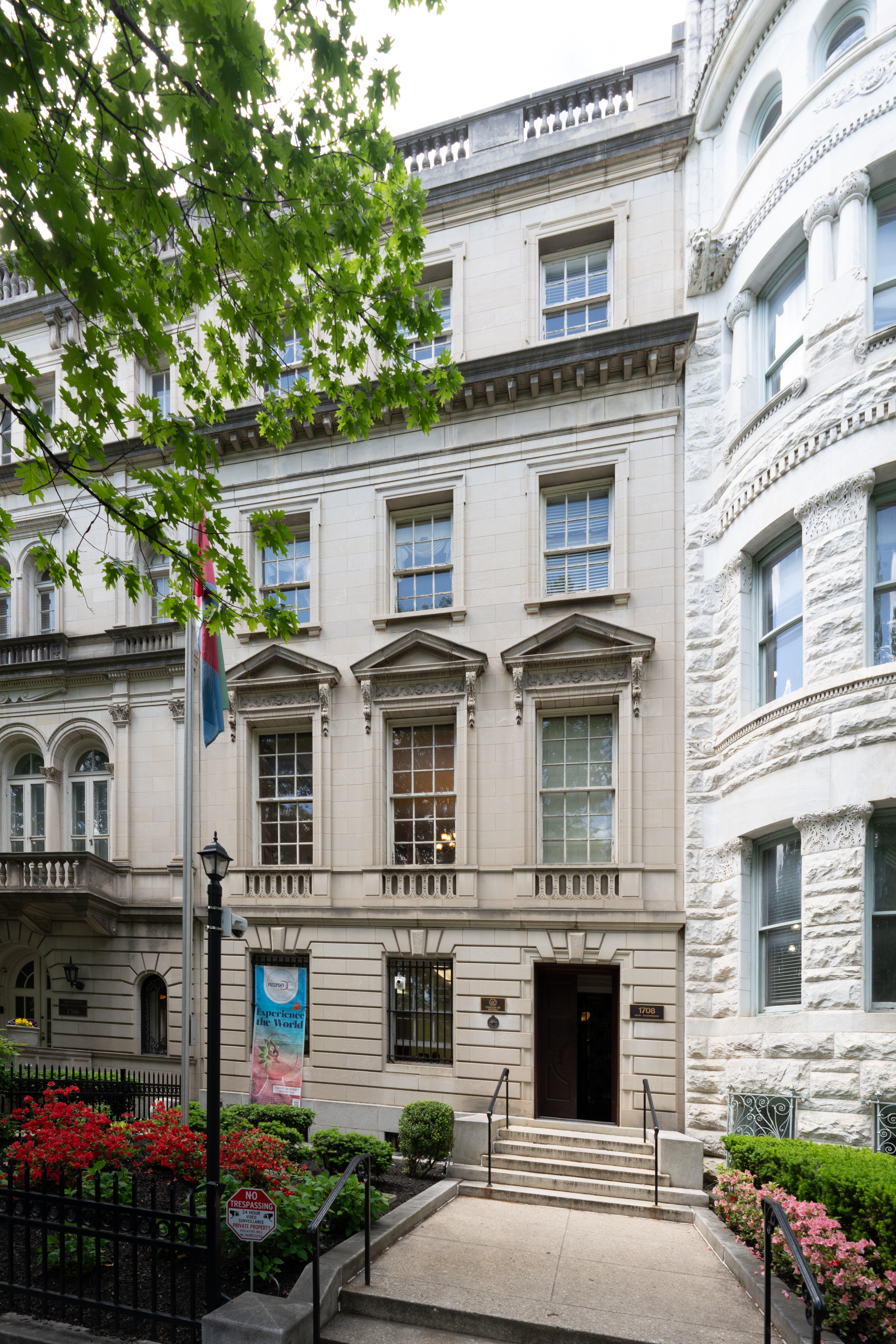
Embassy in Washington D.C.

The U.S. Embassy is in Asmara. Leslie Freriksen has been Chargé d'Affaires at the U.S. Embassy in Asmara, Eritrea, since July 2022.

Eritrea has an embassy in Washington, D.C.. The Eritrean Consulate office in Oakland, California was closed on 1 October 2007.

== See also ==
- Eritrean Americans
- Foreign relations of the United States
- Foreign relations of Eritrea
- List of ambassadors of Eritrea to the United States
