= 2021 in Eritrea =

- Decades: 2000s; 2010s; 2020s
- See also: Other events of 2021; Timeline of Eritrean history

Events in the year 2021 in Eritrea.

== Incumbents ==
Photo	Post	Name
	President	Isaias Afewerki
	President of National Assembly	Isaias Afewerki

== Events ==
- January 7 – Ethiopian Maj. Gen. Belay Seyoum is quoted by Addis Ababa′s Standard magazine confirming the presence of Eritrean Army troops in the Tigray Region of Ethiopia. There are nearly 100,000 Eritrean refugees in Tigray.
- January 25 – Members of the Eritrean Army are accused of widespread looting and weaponizing hunger in the Tigray Region.
- January 27 – The United States Department of State demands that Eritrea withdraw from Tigray.
- February 17 – The United Arab Emirates (UAE) dismantles part of its military base as tensions in Yemen wind down.

== Deaths ==
- February 19 – Adhanom Ghebremariam, 72, military officer and political dissident.

== See also ==
- COVID-19 pandemic in Africa
- Tigray War
- African Union
- Common Market for Eastern and Southern Africa
- Community of Sahel–Saharan States
