= Public holidays in Eritrea =

There are approximately sixteen nationally recognized public holidays in Eritrea. The most important national holidays are Independence Day (May 24), Martyrs' Day (June 20), and Revolution Day (September 1). Additional holidays follow the calendar of the Eritrean Orthodox Tewahedo Church, and the two holy Eids (Eid al-Fitr and Eid al-Adha), as Muslim holidays are observed as public holidays in Eritrea.

== Public holidays ==
Date	English name	Tigrinya Name	Notes
1 January	New Year's Day	Amet ሓዲሽ ዓመት	official, according to Gregorian Calendar
7 January	Orthodox Christmas	Lidet ልደት	observed by adherents of the Eritrean Orthodox Tewahedo Church
19 January	Epiphany	Timket ጥምቀት	observed by adherents of the Eritrean Orthodox Tewahedo Church
variable	Birth of the Prophet		observed by adherents of Sunni Islam
8 March	Women's Day	Maelti Anesti መዓልቲ ኣነስቲ	Coincides with International Women's Day
variable	Good Friday	Arbi Siklet ዓርቢ ስቅለት	observed by all Christian denominations
variable	Easter	Fasika ፋሲካ	observed by all Christian denominations
1 May	May Day		Coincides with International Workers' Day
24 May	Independence Day	Maelti Natsinet መዓልቲ ናጽነት	celebrating independence from Ethiopia in 1991
20 June	Martyrs' Day	Maelti Siwuat መዓልቲ ስውኣት	remembrance for those who gave their lives during the country’s struggle for independence during Eritrean War for Independence
variable	Eid al-Fitr		observed by adherents of Sunni Islam
1 September	Revolution Day	Bahti Meskerem ባሕቲ መስከረም	commemorating the start (1961) of the Eritrean War for Independence and takes place on the anniversary of the first engagement between Eritrean combatants and the Ethiopia sanctioned forces
variable	Eid al-Adha		observed by adherents of Sunni Islam
