= 2016 in Eritrea =

- Decades: 1990s; 2000s; 2010s; 2020s
- See also: Other events of 2016; Timeline of Eritrean history

Events in the year 2016 in Eritrea.

== Incumbents ==
- President: Isaias Afewerki

== Events ==
- 12 – 13 June – The Battle of Tsorona was fought between the army and Ethiopian forces near the border town of Tsorona, Eritrea.
