= Araya Desta =

Eritrean diplomat (1945–2021)

- ኣራያ ደስታ
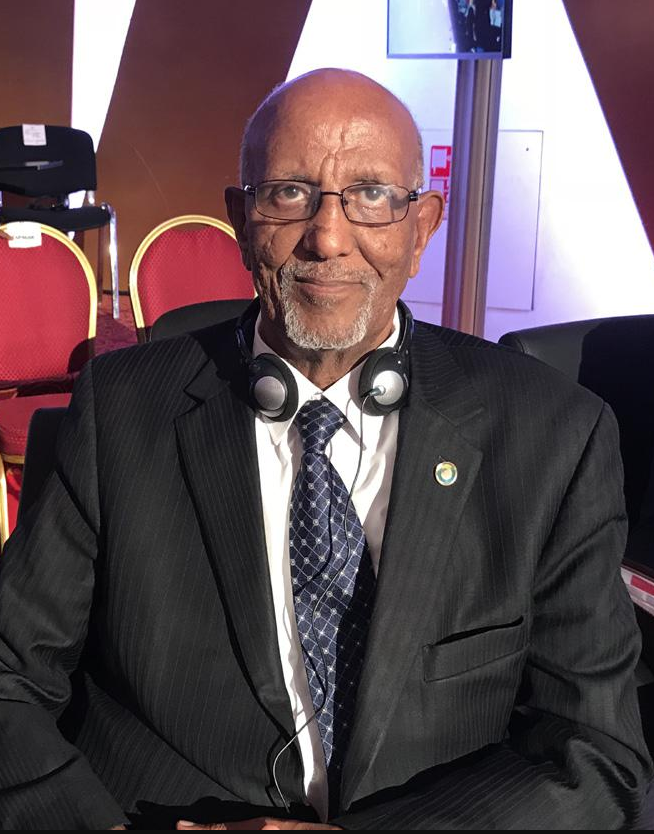

2nd Eritrean Ambassador to the United Nations
- In office 2006–2014
- Succeeded by: Sofia Tesfamariam

Personal details
- Born: 1945 Senafe
- Died: 28 May 2021 (aged 75)
- Party: PFDJ
- Profession: Permanent Representative of Eritrea to the AU and UNECA

Araya Desta, also referred to as Araia Desta, (born 1945 – 28 May 2021) was an Eritrean diplomat who had served as the Permanent Representative of the State of Eritrea to the African Union and UNECA. He previously served as the Ambassador and Permanent Representative of Eritrea to the United Nations in New York from 2006 to 2014.

Araya was born in Senafe, and in 1969 received a Diploma in Weather Forecasting from the Stanmore Meteorological Training Centre in London. From 1972 to 1976, he was Head of the Meteorological Application Section of the Ethiopian Meteorological Services in Addis Ababa, and from 1963 to 1972, he served as Weather Forecaster for the Civil Aviation Administration in Asmara.

He earned a Bachelor of Science degree in Mathematics at the University of Nairobi, Kenya, in 1980, and a master's degree in atmospheric physics at the University of Toronto, Canada, in 1985. Araya worked as a Computer Programmer for the Amoco Canada Petroleum Company in Calgary from 1980 to 1982. Between 1982 and 1991, Araya served on the board of the Eritrean Relief Association in Khartoum, Sudan. From 1982 to 1993, he was Executive Director and Chair of the Eritrean Relief Association-Canada Board of Directors in Ottawa.

Araya then served as First Secretary and Consul at the Eritrean Consulate Ottawa, Ontario, Canada from 1993 to 1994. From 1994 to 2001, he was Minister's Counsellor of Eritrea’s embassy in Beijing, China, while simultaneously serving as a Permanent Representative to the United Nations for his country from 1997 to 2002. He then served as the Eritrean ambassador to the Nordic countries, residing in Stockholm, Sweden, from 2002 to 2005.

== Death ==
Araya died due to natural causes on 28 May 2021. Funeral Services were held on 6 June 2021 in Asmara's Patriots Cemetery. Yemane Ghebremeskel, Eritrea's Minister of Information wrote a eulogy in honor of his public service to the State of Eritrea. He lauded Araya for his invaluable diplomatic career. He writes: "In his diplomatic career, Ambassador Araia Desta served his country as Ambassador to Sweden, China, AU and the UN. A close friend & colleague, Amb. Araia was a consummate diplomat & a very jovial person; undaunted by adversity & always taking matters in his usual, casual, stride."

Beyene Russom, Ambassador of Eritrea to Kenya & Tanzania, wrote: "What surprised me most was his inner strength & will to continue to serve his country even when he was unwell He really fought against his rather long illness undetected & camouflaged by his big smiles bc of his desire to serve his people."

Preceded by Ahmed Baduri	Ambassador and Permanent Representative to the United Nations for Eritrea; 2006 - 2014	Succeeded by Sophia Tesfamariam Yohannes
