= 2013 in Eritrea =

- Decades: 1990s; 2000s; 2010s; 2020s
- See also: Other events of 2013; Timeline of Eritrean history

Events in the year 2013 in Eritrea.

== Incumbents ==
- President: Isaias Afewerki

== Events ==
- 21 January – A group of a soldiers from the national army seized the headquarters of the state broadcaster EriTV and allegedly broadcast a message demanding reforms and the release of political prisoners.
