= Ahmed Baduri =

Eritrean diplomat (1946–2024)

Ahmed Tahir Baduri (23 October 1946 – 30 January 2024) was an Eritrean politician and diplomat who was the Ambassador and Permanent Representative to the United Nations for Eritrea between 2001 and 2005, replacing Haile Menkerios. Baduri was replaced by Araya Desta.

== Biography ==
Ahmed Tahir Baduri was born in Hargigo on 23 October 1946. After finishing elementary education in Hargigo, he travelled to Egypt where he completed secondary education. He joined Halab University in Syria and studied medicine, but quit his studies in 1969 and joined the Eritrean Liberation Front. He then joined the People's Liberation Forces, PLF, which split from the ELF in 1970 and was a founding member of the Eritrean People's Liberation Front. He was a member of the central committee of the Eritrean People's Liberation Front. After the liberation of Eritrea, he served in the government in different capacities and was the head of the investment office and the chamber of commerce. Baduri died on 30 January 2024, at the age of 77.

== Footnotes ==
Preceded by Haile Menkerios	Ambassador and Permanent Representative to the United Nations for Eritrea; 2001–2005	Succeeded by Araya Desta
