= 2015 in Eritrea =

- Decades: 1990s; 2000s; 2010s; 2020s
- See also: Other events of 2015; Timeline of Eritrean history

Events in the year 2015 in Eritrea.

== Incumbents ==
- President: Isaias Afewerki

== Events ==
- 22 – 30 August – The country competed at the 2015 World Championships in Athletics in Beijing, China.
