= 2018 in Eritrea =

- Decades: 1990s; 2000s; 2010s; 2020s
- See also: Other events of 2018; Timeline of Eritrean history

Events in the year 2018 in Eritrea.

== Incumbents ==
- President: Isaias Afewerki

== Events ==
- 8 to 9 July – The 2018 Eritrea–Ethiopia summit took place in Asmara, between Eritrean President Isaias Afwerki and Ethiopian Prime Minister Abiy Ahmed and officials from the two countries.

=== Sports ===
- 9 to 25 February – Eritrea participated at the 2018 Winter Olympics in PyeongChang, South Korea, with 1 competitor in 1 sport; this was the first time Eritrea took part in the Winter Olympics.

== Deaths ==
- 24 May – Tsehaytu Beraki, musician, poet and political activist (b. 1939).
