= Haile Menkerios =

Eritrean diplomat

Haile Menkerios (Tigrinya: ሃይለ መንቀሪዮስ, born October 1, 1946) is an Eritrean diplomat who served as the Head of the United Nations Office to the African Union (UNOAU) and as Special Representative to the African Union, at the level of Under-Secretary-General from 2013 until 2018. He was appointed to this position by United Nations Secretary-General Ban Ki-moon on 17 May 2013.

Menkerios previously served as the United Nations Special Envoy of the Secretary-General for Sudan and South Sudan at the level of Under-Secretary-General. He was the Assistant Secretary-General for Political Affairs.

== Life and career ==
Studying in the United States, Menkerios earned a bachelor's degree from Brandeis University and a master's degree from Harvard University. During the period from 1991 to 2000, Menkerios was Eritrea's Ambassador to Ethiopia and the Organisation of African Unity, its Special Envoy to Somalia and the African Great Lakes region, and was Eritrea's Permanent Representative to the United Nations. Later, as Senior Adviser to Moustapha Niasse, the Special Envoy of the United Nations Secretary-General to the Inter-Congolese Dialogue, he assisted Niasse in the mediation process that led to the Global and All-Inclusive Agreement, which was signed on December 17, 2002 and marked the end of the Congolese Civil War.

In 2001, Menkerios was a member of the G-15 and a signatory on the open letter to President Afwerki to end the war with Ethiopia, and implement the constitution. Menkerios was abroad at the time of the arrests of the G-15 members.

At the UN, he was Director of the Africa I Division in the Department of Political Affairs from June 2003 to June 2005. On September 26, 2005, UN Secretary-General Kofi Annan announced his appointment as Deputy Special Representative of the Secretary-General for the Democratic Republic of the Congo; he assumed this post in October 2005. Subsequently, UN Secretary-General Ban Ki-moon announced his appointment as UN Assistant Secretary-General for Political Affairs on May 16, 2007, and he assumed this post on July 1, 2007.

On June 5, 2008, the United Nations announced that it was sending Menkerios to Zimbabwe to discuss how the UN could assist in the electoral process leading to the second round of Zimbabwe's presidential election. At the UN food summit in Rome a few days earlier, Ban had suggested to Zimbabwean President Robert Mugabe the idea of sending Menkerios to Zimbabwe and Mugabe agreed.

Menkerios was sent to Madagascar in February 2009 to help resolve a political crisis there. He met separately with President Marc Ravalomanana and opposition leader Andry Rajoelina on February 9, and both of them agreed to engage in dialogue.

On February 2, 2010, United Nations Secretary-General Ban Ki-moon announced Menkerios as his Special Representative for the Sudan.

Preceded by Unknown	Ambassador and Permanent Representative to the United Nations for Eritrea; Unknown to 2001	Succeeded by Ahmed Baduri
