= 2012 in Eritrea =

- Decades: 1990s; 2000s; 2010s; 2020s
- See also: Other events of 2012; Timeline of Eritrean history

Events from the year 2012 in Eritrea

== Incumbents ==
- President: Isaias Afewerki

== Events ==
=== March ===
- March 14 - Ethiopian forces attack separatist bases within Eritrea in response to separatists' attacks in Ethiopia's Afar Region.

=== August ===
- August - Four of Eritrea's Olympic athletes, including the team's flagbearer for the Opening Ceremony, apply for asylum in the United Kingdom, citing repressive conditions within Eritrea.

== Sport ==
- July 27 to August 12 – Eritrea at the 2012 Summer Olympics in London, United Kingdom.

=== Unknown dates ===
- Eritrea at the 2012 Winter Youth Olympics in Innsbruck, Austria

== Deaths in 2012 ==
=== January ===
- January 1 – Leveie Sans, 24, Eritrean Dancer, car crash (born 1987)
