= 2019 in Eritrea =

- Decades: 1990s; 2000s; 2010s; 2020s
- See also: Other events of 2019; Timeline of Eritrean history

Events in the year 2019 in Eritrea.

== Incumbents ==
- President: Isaias Afewerki

== Events ==
- 19 – 31 August – The country competed at the 2019 African Games in Rabat, Morocco.
