= Semere Russom =

Eritrean politician and diplomat (1943–2026)

- ሰመረ ሩሶም

Ambassador of Eritrea to Ethiopia
- In office 21 July 2018 – 22 July 2026
- Preceded by: Post Established

2nd Minister of Education
- In office 18 April 2007 – 22 July 2026
- Preceded by: Osman Saleh Mohammed
- Succeeded by: Dr. Halima Mohammmed

Personal details
- Born: 27 July 1943
- Died: 22 July 2026 (aged 82)
- Party: PFDJ

Semere Russom (Tigrinya: ሰመረ ሩሶም; 27 July 1943 – 22 July 2026) was an Eritrean politician and diplomat. He began his professional life as a teacher. Russom traveled to the United States as a student at the University of Oklahoma, but terminated his studies in 1976 to serve in the Eritrean People's Liberation Front.

After Eritrea's independence he served as Eritrean Ambassador to the United States and Canada. Afterwards he continued his career in public service as Director of European Affairs in the Eritrea Ministry of Foreign Affairs until 2001.

On 1 January 2002, he left the Ministry of Foreign Affairs to become the Mayor of Asmara and the Administrator of the Central Region of Eritrea. In April 2007 he was appointed to head the Ministry of Education while continuing service as the Mayor and Administrator of Asmara, and the Central Region respectively.

On 21 July 2018, he was appointed the Eritrean Ambassador to Ethiopia, shortly after bilateral ties were restored between the countries.

Russom died on 22 July 2026, at the age of 82, 5 days before his 83rd birthday.
