= National Confederation of Eritrean Workers =

NCEW
- National Confederation of Eritrean Workers
- Founded: November, 1979
- Headquarters: Asmara, Eritrea
- Location: Eritrea
- Members: 26,000
- Key people: Tekeste Baire, Secretary-General
- Affiliations: ITUC

The National Confederation of Eritrean Workers (NCEW) is a National trade union center in Eritrea. Its predecessor, the National Union of Eritrean Workers (NUEW) was founded in 1979 as the trade union wing of the Eritrean People's Liberation Front (EPLF), then waging a war of independence against Ethiopia. After independence, the NUEW was reconstituted as the NCEW. It has around 26,000 members in five subsidiary federations. It is affiliated with the International Trade Union Confederation.

== Foundation and role in War of Independence ==
Between the 1950s and 1970s, trade unions in Eritrea had significant nationalist factions, which caused conflicts with the Ethiopian government. In the 1970s, escalating conflict with the newly installed Derg regime caused a large number of Eritrean workers to join the armed struggle for independence. NUEW was founded as trade union wing of EPLF, which had become the main Eritrean fighting force, in November 1979 at a convention in Sahel. The union formed clandestine cells within Ethiopian-controlled towns to conduct sabotage and intelligence operations. These local unions were mostly eliminated by the Ethiopia by 1982.

As a result, during the Eritrean War of Independence, NUEW mostly functioned as tool for overseas Eritrean workers to contribute to the war effort. It organized Eritrean workers in the diaspora, including construction workers in Sudan. These workers provided financial support as well as professional and skilled expertise.

== Role in independent Eritrea ==
Eritrea became an independent country in 1991, with EPLF forming the government in its new guise - People's Front for Democracy and Justice. NUEW, while still led by its war-time leadership, changed focus to organizing workers into trade unions with a view to supporting the reconstruction of its war-torn country. Major public and private-sector industries were organized with the support of the government. In 1992, the government increased wages by 50% based on NUEW's intervention. Labour proclamation 8/1991 promulgated in 1991 legalized labour unions and gave workers the right to defend their interests.

At NUEW's last congress in 1994, the organization was transformed into the National Confederation of Eritrean Workers. Chapters representing overseas workers were dissolved. The NCEW consists of individual workplace-based unions grouped together in five trade union federations, responsible for organizing and representing workers in different industrial sectors. By the end of 1994, 18,000 workers had been organized in 111 locals. The five federations comprising the NCEW are -

1. Chemical, mining and general workers federation including at the Assab oil refinery with 1000 workers.
2. Food, drink and allied workers federation
3. Service giving industries workers federation
4. Textile and leather workers federation
5. Transportation and communication workers federation

By 2012, NCEW had 26,000 members. Tekeste Baire had been the Secretary-General of the organization since 1994 until his death in 2022.

The ability of unions to organize and represent workers is constrained by the government. A new law passed in 2001 made NCEW the only legal body entitled to represent workers. Any new union within NCEW formed needs to be approved by the Ministry of Labour and Human Welfare. A number of independent-minded NCEW trade union leaders were arrested and held incommunicado in 2005.
