= Eritrean uprising =

Student protests in Asmara, Eritrea in November 2017

The Eritrean Uprising was a series of large student protests in Asmara, Eritrea in November 2017 against the government, bad living conditions, and severe working life.

Anti-government protests escalated on 1 November, when police clashed with protesters and fired live ammunition to disperse protesters.

On 2 November, groups of protesters rallied in downtown Asmara, demanding better conditions and the resignation of the government.

On 3 November, rallies and small-scale dissent took place throughout the city as protesters rallied in a university.

Tear gas was fired against demonstrators between 5 and 7 November. Police opened fire on demonstrators almost daily, killing 28 protesters in rallies.

== See also ==
- 2016 Ethiopian protests
