= Martyrs' Day (Pakistan) =

Series of holidays in Pakistan

- Type: National
- Significance: Honoring the sacrifices of martyrs who lost their lives defending Pakistan
- Observances: Commemoration of martyrs, prayers, ceremonies, public gatherings
- Date: 30 April

Martyrs' Day, also known as Youm-e-Shuhada, is observed in Pakistan on 30 April every year to honor the sacrifices and bravery of the martyrs who lost their lives defending the country.

== History ==
The significance of Martyrs' Day in Pakistan dates back to the early years of the country's history. Pakistan faced various challenges and conflicts since its independence in 1947, including wars with neighboring India, internal conflicts, and acts of terrorism. Many soldiers, law enforcement personnel, and civilians sacrificed their lives during these trying times to protect the sovereignty and security of Pakistan.

== Observances ==
On Martyrs' Day, various ceremonies, events, and tributes are organized throughout the country to commemorate the fallen heroes. The government, military organizations, and civil society actively participate in organizing events and activities to honor the sacrifices of the martyrs. These include parades, public gatherings, exhibitions, seminars, and speeches. The families of the martyrs are often invited as guests of honor, and their contributions are acknowledged and appreciated.

== See also ==
- Public holidays in Pakistan
- Pakistan Armed Forces
- Pakistan Day
- Independence Day (Pakistan)
