= Afwerki Abraha =

Eritrean diplomat and chemist (c. 1949 – 2020)

Afwerki Abraha (c. 1949 – 13 May 2020) was an Eritrean diplomat, chemist, and pro-independence rebel fighter during the Eritrean War of Independence. During the 1990s, Abraha became the first Eritrean diplomat to be posted to Ethiopia following Eritrea's independence.

Abraha studied political science and chemistry in the Russian Soviet Federative Socialist Republic, where he became a chemist. He then moved to the former East Germany. In 1975, Abraha left Germany to join the Eritrean separatist rebels in the ongoing Eritrean War of Independence.

Eritrea achieved independence in 1993. Following the war, Afwerki Abraha became a diplomat. During the 1990s, Abraha became the first Eritrean diplomat to be posted to Ethiopia.

In 1996, Abraha was stationed in London, where he served in the Embassy of Eritrea from 1996 until 2001. Abraha's wife, Fatina Ahmedin, an Eritrean artist and former rebel fighter, was struck by a car in London, and became paralyzed from the accident. As a result, couple decided to permanently remain in the United Kingdom so Ahmedin could receive medical treatment. Abraha remained her caretaker for more than 20 years.

Afwerki Abraha died from COVID-19 during the COVID-19 pandemic in England at a London hospital on 13 May 2020, at the age of 71. Abraha, who had no pre-existing health conditions, had been hospitalized in the intensive care unit for coronavirus treatment for the previous month.
