= 2023 in Eritrea =

- Decades: 2000s; 2010s; 2020s
- See also: Other events of 2023; Timeline of Eritrean history

Events in the year 2023 in Eritrea.

== Incumbents ==
Photo	Post	Name
	President	Isaias Afewerki
	President of National Assembly	Isaias Afewerki

== Events ==
- January 21 – Tigrayan peace process: Eritrean forces withdraw from Shire and other major towns in the Tigray Region of Ethiopia.
- May 7 – Eritrea is accused of forced deportation and repatriating of 3,500 Eritreans from Sudan to Teseney and other towns near the Sudanese–Eritrean border.
- June 12 – Eritrea rejoins the Intergovernmental Authority on Development trade bloc almost 16 years after suspending its membership in 2007.

== See also ==
- COVID-19 pandemic in Africa
- Tigray War
- African Union
- Common Market for Eastern and Southern Africa
- Community of Sahel–Saharan States
