= List of ambassadors of Eritrea to the United States =

Coordinates: 38.912778°N 77.040556°W

Chargé d'Affaires of Eritrea to the United States Embassy of Eritrea in Washington, D.C.
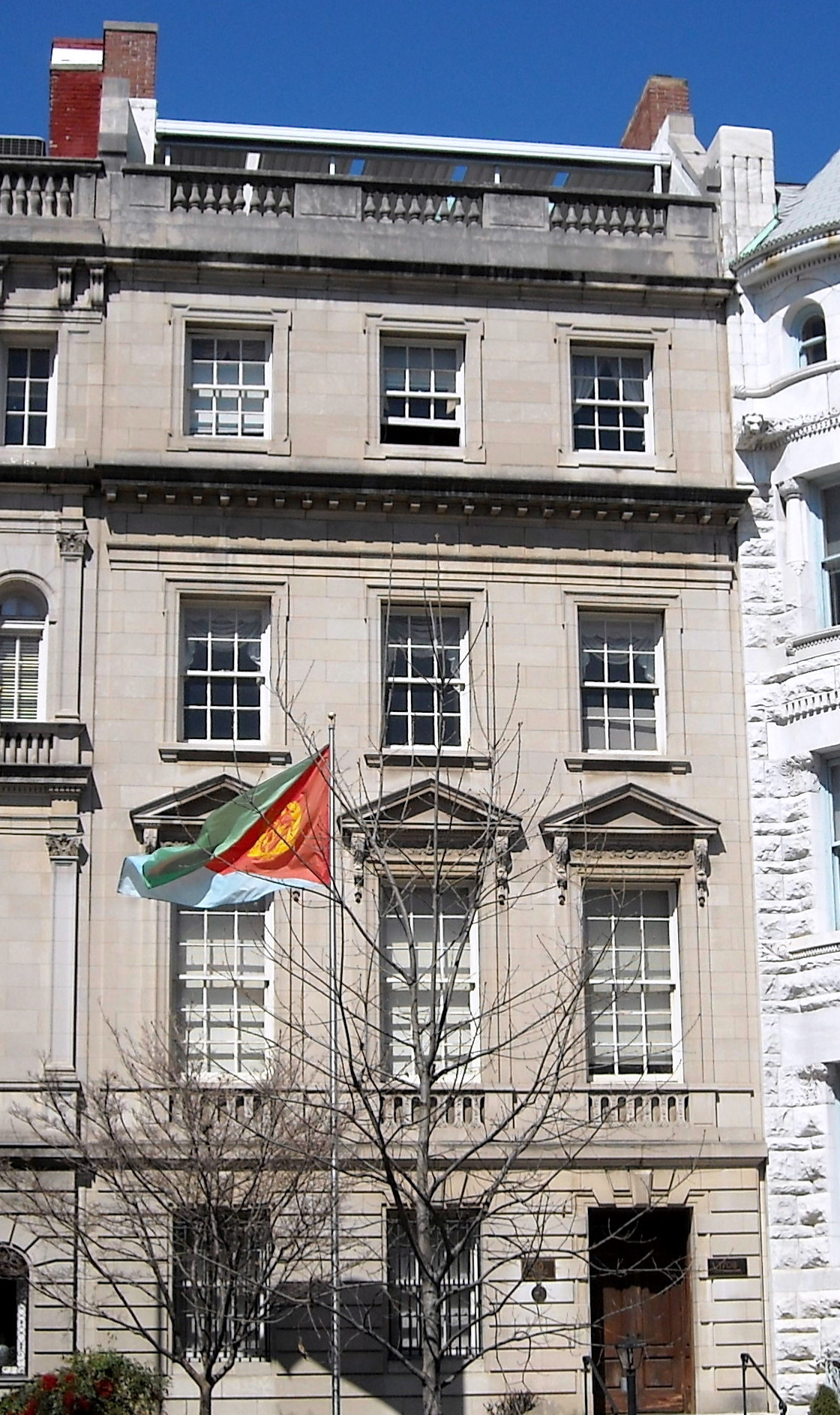
- Incumbent; Berhane G. Solomon
- Inaugural holder: Hagos Ghebrehiwet
- Formation: October 1, 1993

The Eritrean ambassador in Washington, D. C. is the official representative of the Government in Asmara to the Government of the United States.

== List of representatives ==
Diplomatic agrément	Diplomatic accreditation	Ambassador	Observations	List of heads of state of Eritrea	List of presidents of the United States	Term end
August 5, 1993			Embassy opened	Isaias Afwerki	Bill Clinton	
August 5, 1993	October 1, 1993	Hagos Ghebrehiwet	*In 1989 he was representative of the Eritrean rebels in the United States. Eritrea declared independence from Ethiopia on May 24, 1993.	Isaias Afwerki	Bill Clinton	
December 28, 1994	January 30, 1995	Amdemicael Kahsai	(*October 24, 1942 in Gherat Ghebru, Eritrea, August 13, 2003 in Asmara): member of the EPLF Central Committee and Secretary of the Central Bureau for; Ambassador to Italy and was also Mayor of Asmara.; During the time of his murder he was deposed from government positions, Frozen (Medescal) and was without a post.	Isaias Afwerki	Bill Clinton	
July 27, 1997	September 8, 1997	Semere Russom	The mayor of Asmara, who in March 2014 became Minister of Education	Isaias Afwerki	Bill Clinton	
April 10, 2001	June 20, 2001	Girma Asmerom		Isaias Afwerki	George W. Bush	
July 31, 2006	September 12, 2006	Ghirmai Ghebremariam	April 11, 2000 ambassador in London	Isaias Afwerki	George W. Bush	

== See also ==
- Eritrea–United States relations
