= Tekeste Baire =

Eritrean trade union activist (c. 1953 – 2022)

Tekeste Baire (c. 1953 – 6 October 2022) was an Eritrean activist who served as the Secretary-General of the National Confederation of Eritrean Workers. He was first elected to this position in 1994 when the pre-independence National Union of Eritrean Workers was transformed into the NCEW.
