= Sophia Tesfamariam Yohannes =

Eritrean diplomat

H.E. Sophia Tesfamariam Yohannes

Permanent Representative to the UN for Eritrea
- Incumbent
- Assumed office 5 September 2019

Personal details
- Born: May 25, 1960 (64 years old) Asmara, Ethiopia

Sophia Tesfamariam Yohannes is the Permanent Representative of Eritrea to the United Nations, having presented her credentials to UN Secretary-General António Guterres on September 5, 2019. She is a Vice President of the 2025 Executive Board of UNICEF.

She earned a Bachelor of Science degree in management from Western International University in Phoenix, Arizona.

Her grandfather was Tefazion Deres, leader of the Eritrean Independence Party and brother of the national hero Zerai Deres.

== Biography and Family ==
Sophia Tesfamariam Yohannes was born on May 25, 1960, in Asmara. She is married and has three children. Her grandfather, Tefazion Deres, was a prominent leader in the Eritrean Independence Party. Her grand-uncle, Zerai Deres, is celebrated as a national hero for his anti-colonial resistance against Italian rule.

== Career and contributions ==
In 2019, Sophia Tesfamariam Yohannes was appointed as Eritrea's Permanent Representative to the United Nations in New York.

She chaired the African Group at the UN in 2021, representing the collective interests of African nations in major discussions and resolutions. Sophia Tesfamariam has been instrumental in amplifying Africa's voice at the United Nations. She address issues specific to the continent, such as United Nations Security Council (UNSC) reforms and reducing external interference in African states' affairs.

She has emphasized autonomy and sovereignty rather than dependence on foreign aid. Her advocacy includes the importance of African solutions to African problems and strengthening the representation of Africans in high-level UN positions to ensure balanced global governance and calling for greater inclusion of African perspectives in global discussions. This is consistent with her advocacy of “pluralistic” sciences and the participation of marginalized communities in decision-making processes.

She was appointed as Vice President of the 2025 Executive Board of UNICEF.

== Advocacy and Political Positions ==
She has consistently argued against international sanctions on Eritrea, framing them as politically motivated and unjust.

Sophia actively critiques UN reports on Eritrea, asserting they lack objectivity and fail to represent the reality on the ground.

She has spoken extensively on Eritrea’s role in fostering stability in the Horn of Africa, particularly in relation to conflicts involving Ethiopia and Tigray.

She has consistently defended the Eritrean regime’s authoritarian rule, justifying its lack of elections, constitutional governance, and severe restrictions on freedoms of speech, press, and association. She has been a vocal advocate for Eritrea’s indefinite military conscription system, which forces young Eritreans into the Sawa camp for military training under harsh conditions, including reports of torture, forced labor, and sexual abuse. Additionally, she has denied well-documented war crimes committed by Eritrean troops during the Tigray War, including mass killings, sexual violence, and the destruction of schools and essential infrastructure. Despite overwhelming evidence from human rights organizations and UN reports, she dismissed these atrocities as baseless allegations and has actively shielded the Eritrean government from international scrutiny.

== Key Achievements ==
She played a significant role in advancing African resolutions on development, energy access, and institutional capacity-building during her tenure as chair of the African Group. She underlined the importance of pan-African solidarity and international cooperation to achieve the Sustainable Development Goals (SDGs).

Advocated for the protection of sovereignty and non-interference in Eritrean domestic affairs during high-profile UN debates.

== Criticisms and Controversies ==
Critics have accused her of unconditionally supporting the Eritrean regime, which has been the subject of human rights allegations.

Her statements on the Eritrean migrants who perished on Lampedusa in 2013 were roundly condemned for their lack of compassion when she referred to hundreds of drowned children as, "rich kids with a lot of money from the cities of Eritrea".

Her appointment to the role of Vice President of UNICEF's 2025 Executive Board sparked controversy due to her close ties to the Eritrean regime, which has systematically violated children's rights. As an ardent supporter of President Isaias Afewerki and the ruling People's Front for Democracy and Justice party, she has defended Eritrea’s indefinite military conscription system, which forces children into the Sawa camp for military training, exposing them to abuse, torture, and sexual violence. She has also denied well-documented war crimes committed by Eritrean troops against children in Tigray, including mass killings, sexual violence, and the destruction of schools.

== Legacy and Vision ==
Sophia Tesfamariam emphasizes the importance of reparations for colonial injustices and the inclusion of African perspectives in global governance. For example, she supports the idea that colonial injustices must be redressed through concrete efforts, including financial and symbolic reparations, as outlined in initiatives such as the African Union's African Programme of Action on Reparations. This programme promotes solutions such as debt cancellation, technology transfers and the fight against colonial legacies, including discriminatory laws and land dispossession.

She advocates for "pluralist sciences" that prioritize local voices, particularly those of marginalized Eritrean communities, in research and policy-making.

== Public Mentions ==
Sophia Tesfamariam frequently features in international media for her speeches and leadership roles, particularly during her tenure at the African Group.

Her statements on Eritrean sovereignty and African unity have been cited in numerous UN proceedings and regional forums.
