= Martyrs' Day =

Day designed to honour martyrs

Martyrs' Day are days observed in or by some countries, including the Albania, Burkina Faso, India, Myanmar, Panama and Tunisia, to recognise martyrs such as soldiers, revolutionaries or victims of genocide. Below is a list of various Martyrs' Days for different countries of the World.

== Albania ==
Martyrs' Day (Albania) (Albanian: Dita e Dëshmorëve) is an Albanian Holiday observed annually on May 5 for the remembrance of those who died for Albanian liberation during World War 2. The date was chosen for its significance as the anniversary of the assassination of Qemal Stafa by Italian fascists in 1942. His death became a symbol of anti-fascism and Albanian liberation.

== Afghanistan ==
Martyrs' Day is observed on September 9 (variable), the anniversary of Ahmad Shah Massoud's 2001 assassination. It has also been recognised officially by San Diego County, California, home to the highest concentration of Afghani immigrants and refugees in the United States.

== Armenia ==
Armenian Genocide Remembrance Day, on April 24 in Armenia, commemorates the Armenian genocide, which occurred from 1915 to 1923 in the Ottoman Empire.

== Australia and New Zealand ==
Anzac Day (/ˈænzæk/) is a national day of remembrance in Australia and New Zealand that broadly commemorates all Australians and New Zealanders "who served and died in all wars, conflicts, and peacekeeping operations" and "the contribution and suffering of all those who have served". Observed on 25 April each year, Anzac Day was originally devised to honour the members of the Australian and New Zealand Army Corps (ANZAC) who served in the Gallipoli Campaign, their first engagement in the First World War (1914–1918).

== Azerbaijan ==
Martyrs' Day in Azerbaijan is observed on January 20, in memory of those killed in the Black January events.

== Bangladesh ==
- Language Movement Day, also known as Language Martyrs' Day, on 21 February in Bangladesh, commemorates Bengali as a national language.
- Bengali Genocide Remembrance Day is observed on 25 March in Bangladesh to commemorate the victims of the Bengali Genocide of 1971, initially in 2017.
- Martyred Intellectuals Day is observed on 14 December in Bangladesh to commemorate those intellectuals who were killed by Pakistani forces and their collaborators during the 1971 Liberation War, particularly on 14 December 1971.

== Burkina Faso ==
Martyrs' Day, on October 31, honors victims of the 2015 Burkinabé coup d'état.

== Burma (Myanmar) ==
Martyrs' Day, on July 19, commemorates the day when nine Burmese independence leaders were assassinated in 1947.

== China ==
Martyrs' Day (China) is celebrated on September 30, the eve of the National Day of the People's Republic of China, to commemorate those who lost their lives for the national and territorial integrity of the people of China. It was created by the National People's Congress in 2014.

== Eritrea ==
Martyrs' Day (Eritrea), is observed on June 20 of every year to honor the fallen heroes of Eritrea's warriors from the Yikealo and Warsay generations.

== India ==
January 30 is recognised nationally as Martyrs' Day in India, to mark the assassination of Mahatma Gandhi in 1948. A number of states and regions recognise other days as Martyrs' Day locally.

== Lebanon ==
Martyrs' Day (Lebanon and Syria), commemorates the execution of Muslim and Christian Lebanese and Syrian Arab nationalists in Beirut (on what's now called Martyrs Square) by the Ottoman soldiers on May 6 1916 and martyrs of the Lebanese civil war, which took place from 1975 till 1990.

Hezbollah also holds its own Martyrs' Day commemorations on November 11 annually.

== Libya ==
16 September Martyrs' Day remembers Libyans killed or exiled under Italian rule and those who were killed in the 17 February revolution.

== Madagascar ==
Martyrs' Day in the country, observed every 29 March, commemorates the beginning of the 1947 Malagasy Uprising.

== Malawi ==
In Malawi, Martyrs' Day is celebrated on March 3 to honor the political heroes who gave their lives in the struggle against British colonialism.

== Malaysia ==
Warriors' Day (Malay: Hari Pahlawan; Chinese: 国家纪念日) is a day in Malaysia that commemorates the servicemen killed during the two World Wars and the Malayan Emergency. By extension, it honours all individuals who lost their lives in the line of duty throughout Malaysia's history.

== Mali ==
Martyrs' Day or Democracy Day is celebrated on March 26 and honors the victims of the 1991 Malian coup d'état.

== Nepal ==
In Nepal, Martyrs' Day (Nepali: शहीद दिवस) is celebrated on January 30, corresponding to Magh 16 (Nepali: माघ १६ गते) in the Hindu Vikram Samvat calendar.

Martyr (Nepali: शहिद; Shahid) in Nepal is a term for someone who is executed while making contributions for the welfare of the country or society. The term was originally used for individuals who died while opposing the Rana Regime which was in place in the Kingdom of Nepal from 1846 until 1951. There are five martyrs in Nepal.

Lakhan Thapa is regarded as the first martyr of Nepal.

== Netherlands ==
Remembrance of the Dead (Dutch: Dodenherdenking) is held annually on May 4 in the Netherlands. It commemorates all civilians and members of the armed forces of the Kingdom of the Netherlands who have died in wars or peacekeeping missions since the beginning of the Second World War.

== Pakistan ==
Martyrs' Day or Youm-e-Shuhada is a Pakistani holiday held on 30 April to pay tribute to Pakistani military who died in service of their country.

== Panama ==
Martyrs' Day (Panama), is a Panamanian holiday which commemorates the January 9 1964 riots over sovereignty of the Panama Canal Zone.

== São Tomé and Príncipe ==
Dia dos Mártires da Liberdade, 3 February, commemorates the 1953 Batepá massacre.

== South Korea ==
June 6th is served as Memorial day in South Korea, on which all the Koreans who sacrificed themselves for the nation, especially the soldiers who served in Korean War, are commemorated. Also, November 17th is served as Patriotic Martyrs Day, on which patriots who devoted themselves to the retrieval of national sovereignty from the Empire of Japan are commemorated. The date was chosen because of the Eulsa treaty, in which the Korean Empire was deprived of its diplomatic sovereignty by Japan, on November 17th, 1905.

== South Sudan ==
30 July is Martyrs' Day in South Sudan commemorating the death of John Garang de Mabior, leader of the Sudan People's Liberation Army during the Second Sudanese Civil War. Following a peace agreement, he briefly served as First Vice President of Sudan for three weeks until his death in a helicopter crash on July 30, 2005. Foul play in his death has never been proven, but July 30 is marked as Martyrs' Day in South Sudan.

== Syria ==
Martyrs' Day (Lebanon and Syria), commemorates the execution of Muslim and Christian Lebanese and Syrian Arab nationalists in Damascus and Beirut by the Ottoman Empire on 6 May 1916. In 2025, Syrian President Ahmed al-Sharaa issued a presidential decree defining the country’s official holidays, removing Martyrs' Day from the list.

== Togo ==
21 June honours all who struggled for the freedom of Togo. It is celebrated with a military parade in Lomé

== Tunisia ==
April 9 Martyrs' Day remembers Tunisians killed in 1938.

== Turkey ==
March 18, is recognised in remembrance of Turkish soldiers fallen in action. It is on the same date Ottoman forces defeated a naval attack of the Allied Powers in Gallipoli Campaign during World War I on March 18, 1915.

== Uganda ==
In Uganda, Martyrs' Day is celebrated on June 3, mainly in honor of the Uganda Martyrs; Christian converts who were murdered for their religion in Uganda's biggest kingdom, Buganda in the late-1880s.

== United Arab Emirates ==
Martyrs' Day (United Arab Emirates) also known as Commemoration Day (United Arab Emirates) will be marked annually on November 30, recognising the sacrifices and dedication of Emirati martyrs who have given their life in the UAE and abroad in the field of civil, military and humanitarian service.

== United States ==
Memorial Day (originally known as Decoration Day) is a federal holiday in the United States for honoring and mourning the military personnel who have died in the performance of their military duties. Since 1971, the holiday is observed on the last Monday of May. The holiday was observed on May 30 from of 1868 to 1970.

Martyrs Day is an annual day of observance to honor slain American activists and protesters, of any era, in United States history. American martyrs can also be those whose deaths led to positive change in the areas of civil rights, social justice, equality, labor, and voting rights in the United States. Martyrs Day is observed each year on July 5th, following the celebration of Independence Day on July 4th, and acts as a day of education, reflection, and recommitment regarding social justice and civil rights. A variety of local committees host formal Martyrs Day events across the nation on July 5th, along with informal grassroots events. Martyrs Day was founded by professor, author, and legal historian Gloria J. Browne-Marshall, in 2025, and inspired by her book "A Protest History of the United States." America's first Martyrs Day was observed on July 5, 2026.

== Vietnam ==
The Memorial Day for War Martyrs is recognised on 27 July, in Vietnam.
