= Independence Day (Eritrea) =

National holiday in Eritrea

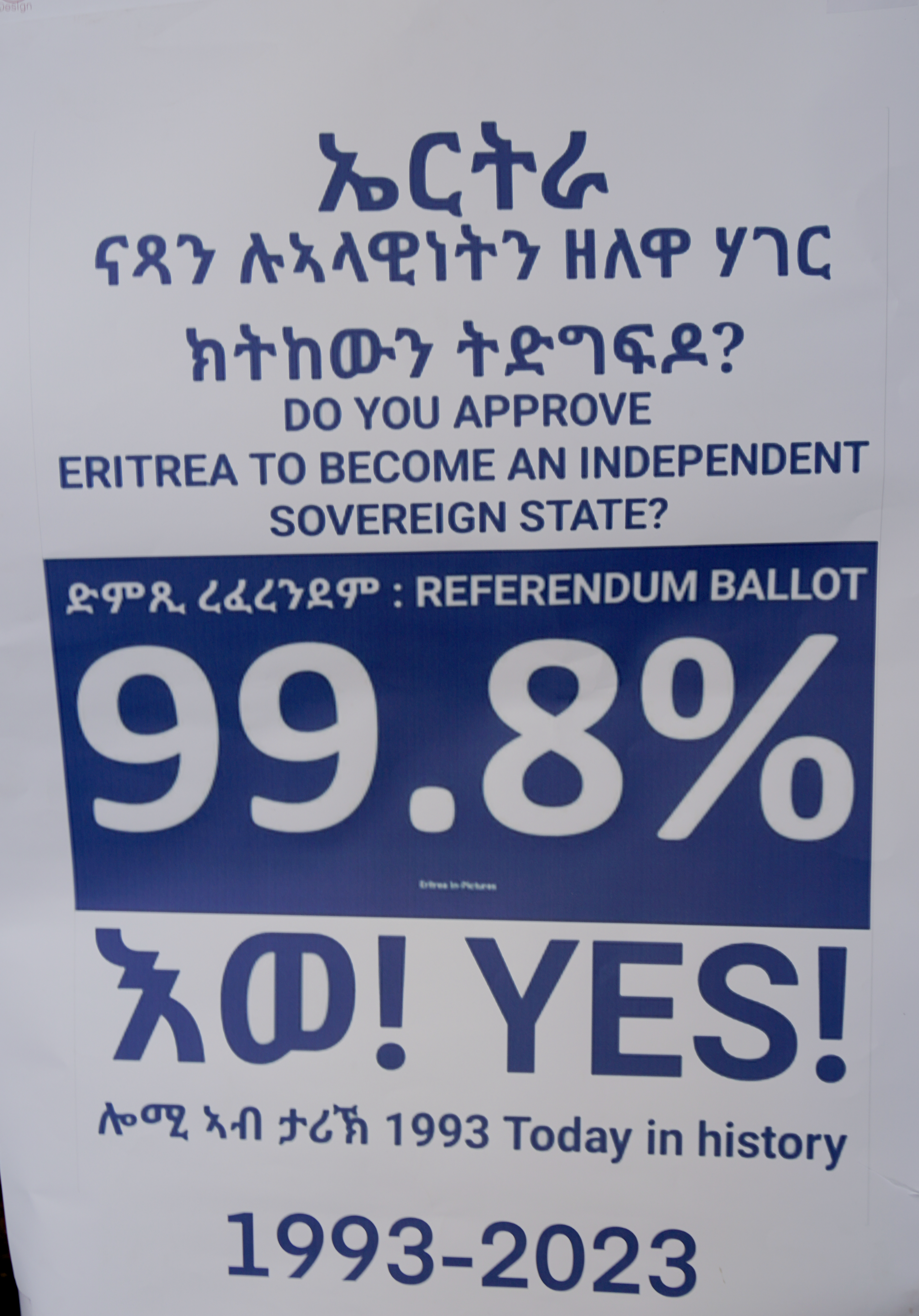
- Sign commemorating the 1993 Eritrean independence referendum
- Observed by: Eritrea
- Type: National
- Significance: The day Eritrea declared independence from Ethiopia
- Date: May 24
- Next time: 24 May 2026
- Frequency: annual

The Independence Day of Eritrea is one of the most important public holidays in the country. It is observed on May 24 every year. On this day in 1991, Eritrean People's Liberation Front forces moved into the capital Asmara, reinstating independence, following a 30-year war against the Ethiopian military regime. Eritrea Independence Day is a national holiday, with workers given a day off.

Independence Day is always celebrated on May 24 of every year in Eritrea. But the festivities are a week-long leading up to May 24 so it is referred to as “Independence Week’’or qinyat natsnet. The week-long festivities are marked by carnivals, street performances, sporting competitions, cycling races, musical concerts, parades, tent parties, much flag-waving and many displays of patriotism.

During this special week, Eri-TV's schedule is sprinkled with documentaries from the armed struggle for independence to remind the population of the heavy sacrifice paid to liberate the country and defend it.

Eritrea's Independence Day is also celebrated by the diaspora communities who live outside the country. The diaspora communities tend to celebrate it on weekends to attract a larger crowd. There are many concerts, picnics, barbecues, and outdoor festivities at various parks across the globe stretching from Australia to California and all around the world.

Concerts, carnivals and street performances are always the big draw during Independence Week. In 2016, Eritrea's landmark Silver Jubilee Anniversary, bands and orchestras from such diverse nations as Germany, Turkey, Uganda, South Africa, Bolivia, China, Japan, Chile, Sudan, United States and Australia performed in Asmara. The Malian Superstar, Habib Koite, has also been known to perform to capacity crowds in Asmara's theaters during Independence Week.

Independence Day is one of three important state-related holidays in Eritrea. The others are Martyrs' Day and September 1st Revolution Day.
